= El Paso, Texas =

El Paso
- City
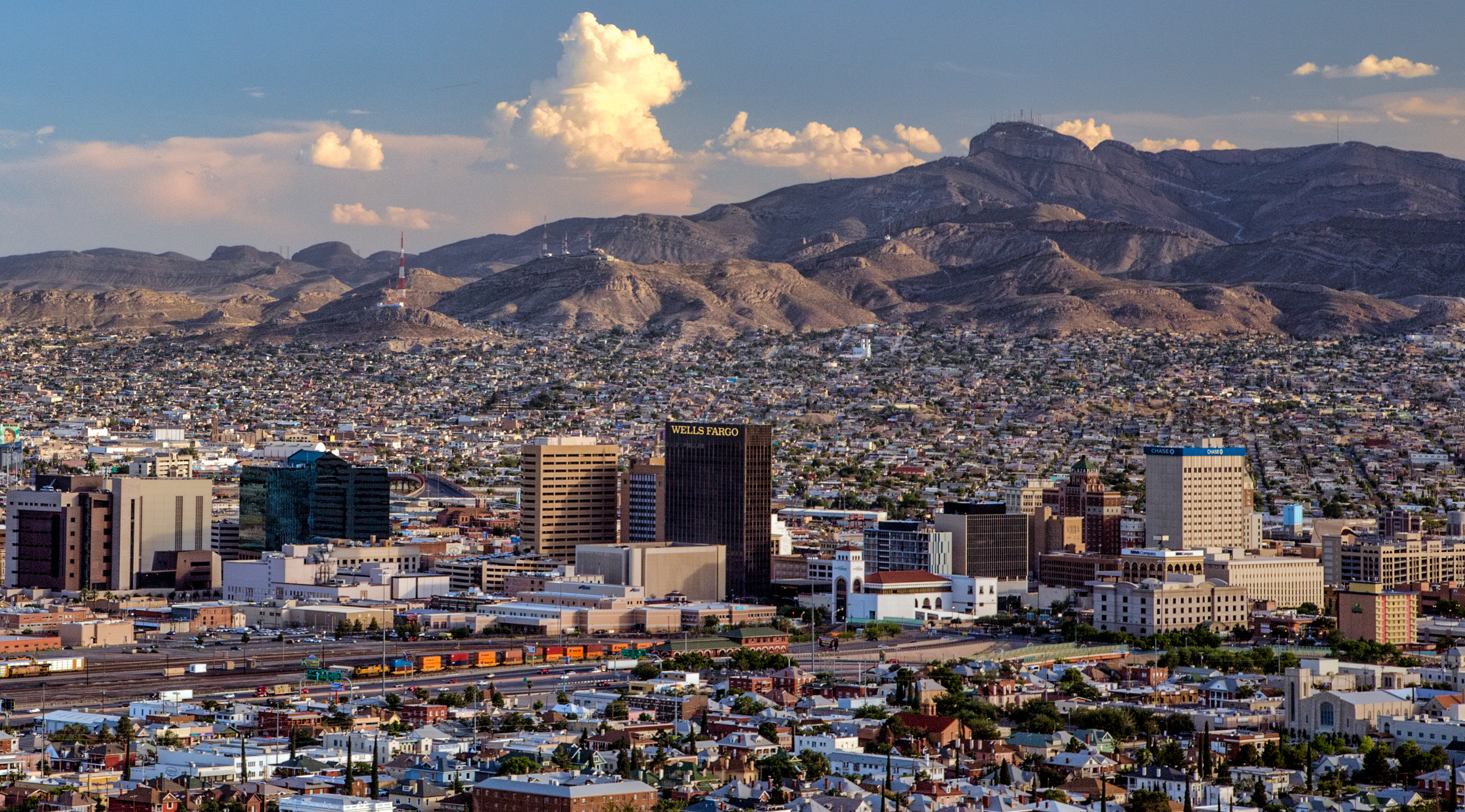
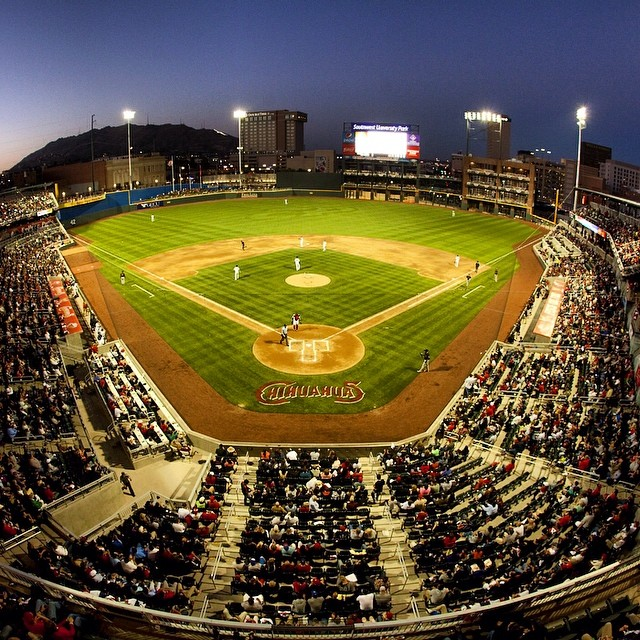
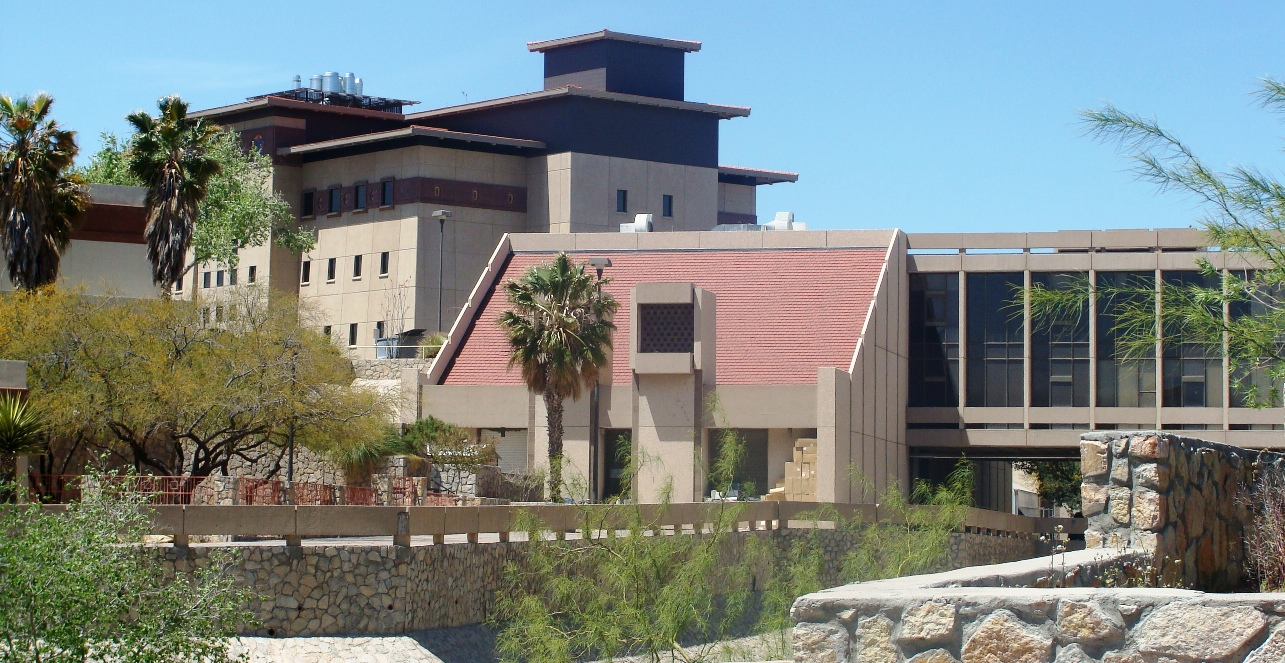
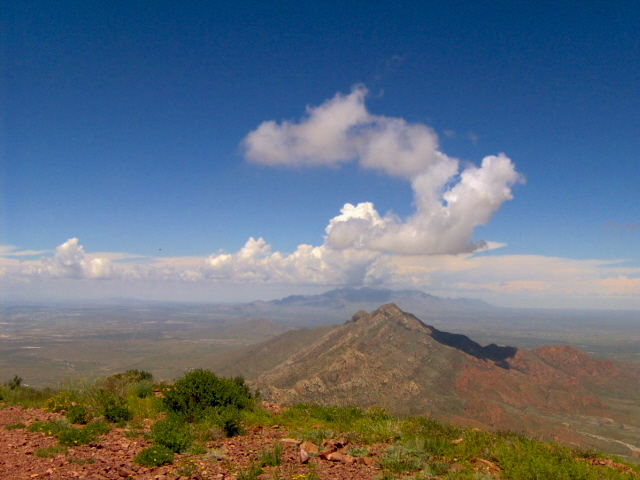
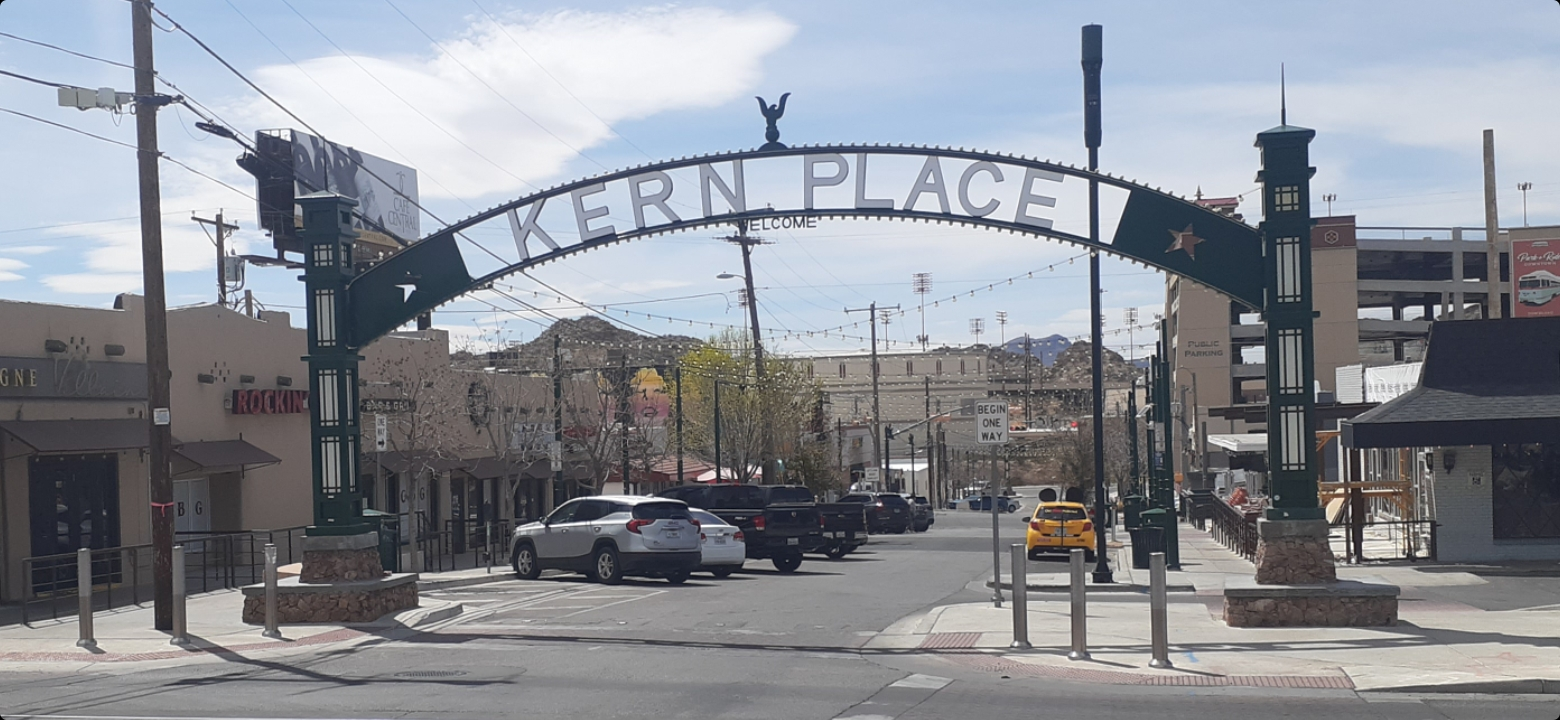
- Downtown El Paso Southwest University Park Ysleta Mission University of Texas at El Paso North Franklin Mountain Kern Place

- Flag Seal Logo
- Nicknames: The Sun City, El Chuco
- Interactive map of El Paso
- Location within Texas Location within the United States
- Coordinates: 31°45′33″N 106°29′19″W
- Country: United States
- State: Texas
- County: El Paso
- First settlement: 1680; 346 years ago
- Settled as Franklin: 1849; 177 years ago
- Renamed El Paso: 1852; 174 years ago
- Town laid out: 1859; 167 years ago
- Incorporated: 1873; 153 years ago

Government
  - Type: Council–manager
  - Mayor: Renard Johnson
  - City council: Alejandra Chavez; Josh Acevedo; Deanna Maldonado-Rocha; Cynthia Boyar Trejo; Ivan Niño; Art Fierro; Lily Limón; Chris Canales
  - City manager: Dionne Mack

Area
  - City: 259.25 sq mi (671.46 km^{2})
  - Land: 258.43 sq mi (669.33 km^{2})
  - Water: 0.82 sq mi (2.13 km^{2})
- Elevation: 3,763 ft (1,147 m)

Population (2020)
  - City: 678,815
  - Rank: 66th in North America; 22nd in the United States; 6th in Texas
  - Density: 2,626.7/sq mi (1,014.17/km^{2})
  - Urban: 854,584 (US: 53rd)
  - Urban density: 3,340/sq mi (1,289.5/km^{2})
  - Metro: 879,392 (US: 69th)
  - CSA: 1,108,758
- Demonym: El Pasoan

GDP
  - Metro: $48.609 billion (2023)
- Time zone: UTC−07:00 (MST)
  - Summer (DST): UTC−06:00 (MDT)
- ZIP Codes: 79900–79999; 88500–88599 (PO boxes)
- Area code: 915
- FIPS code: 48-24000
- GNIS feature ID: 2410414
- Website: elpasotexas.gov

El Paso (English: /ɛl ˈpæsoʊ/; Spanish: [el ˈpaso], lit. 'the route' or 'the pass') is a city in and the county seat of El Paso County, Texas, United States. It is the 23rd-most populous city in the U.S., sixth-most populous city in Texas, and the most populous city in West Texas with a population of 678,815 at the 2020 census. The El Paso metropolitan area has an estimated 879,000 residents.

El Paso stands on the Rio Grande across the Mexico–United States border from Ciudad Juárez, the most populous city in the Mexican state of Chihuahua. On the U.S. side, the El Paso metropolitan area forms part of the larger El Paso–Las Cruces combined statistical area with Las Cruces, New Mexico with a population of 1,108,758. These three cities form a combined international metropolitan area sometimes referred to as the Paso del Norte or the Borderplex, a region of 2.7 million people which constitutes the largest bilingual and binational workforce in the Western Hemisphere.

The city is home to three publicly traded companies, and is also home to the Medical Center of the Americas, the only medical research and care provider complex in West Texas, and the University of Texas at El Paso, the city's primary university. The city hosts the annual Sun Bowl college football postseason game, the second-oldest bowl game in the country. El Paso has a strong federal and military presence. William Beaumont Army Medical Center, Biggs Army Airfield, and Fort Bliss are located in the area. The Drug Enforcement Administration domestic field division 7, El Paso Intelligence Center, Joint Task Force North, United States Border Patrol El Paso Sector, and the U.S. Border Patrol Special Operations Group are also headquartered in El Paso.

El Paso is a five-time All-America City Award winner, winning in 1969, 2010, 2018, 2020, and 2021, and Congressional Quarterly ranked it in the top-three safest large cities in the United States between 1997 and 2014, including holding the title of the safest city between 2011 and 2014. El Paso is also the second-largest absolute-majority-Hispanic city in the United States (after San Antonio), with 81% of its residents being Hispanic, and the largest city in the US with an absolute Hispanic majority throughout all of its history.

== History ==
=== Early years ===
The El Paso region has had human settlement for thousands of years, as evidenced by Folsom points from hunter-gatherers found at Hueco Tanks. This suggests 10,000 to 12,000 years of human habitation. The earliest known cultures in the region were maize farmers. When the Spanish arrived, the Manso, Suma, and Jumano tribes populated the area. These were subsequently incorporated into the mestizo culture, along with immigrants from central Mexico, captives from Comanchería, and genízaros of various ethnic groups. The Mescalero Apache were also present.

The Chamuscado and Rodríguez Expedition trekked through present-day El Paso and forded the Rio Grande where they visited the land that is present-day New Mexico in 1581–1582. The expedition was led by Francisco Sánchez, called "El Chamuscado", and Fray Agustín Rodríguez, the first Spaniards known to have walked along the Rio Grande and visited the Pueblo Indians since Francisco Vásquez de Coronado 40 years earlier. Spanish explorer Don Juan de Oñate was born in 1550 in Zacatecas, Zacatecas, Mexico, and was the first New Spain (Mexico) explorer known to have rested and stayed 10 days by the Rio Grande near El Paso, in 1598, celebrating a Thanksgiving Mass there on April 30, 1598. Four survivors of the Narváez expedition, Álvar Núñez Cabeza de Vaca, Alonso del Castillo Maldonado, Andrés Dorantes de Carranza, and an enslaved native of Morocco, Estevanico, are thought to have crossed the Rio Grande into present-day Mexico about 75 miles south of El Paso in 1535. El Paso del Norte (present-day Ciudad Juárez) was founded on the south bank of the Río Bravo del Norte (Rio Grande), in 1659 by Fray Garcia de San Francisco. In 1680, the small village of El Paso became the temporary base for Spanish governance of the territory of New Mexico as a result of the Pueblo Revolt, until 1692, when Santa Fe was reconquered and once again became the capital.

The Texas Revolution (1836) was generally not felt in the region, as the American population was small, not more than 10% of the population. However, the region was claimed by Texas as part of the treaty signed with Mexico and numerous attempts were made by Texas to bolster these claims, but the villages that consisted of what is now El Paso and the surrounding area remained essentially a self-governed community with both representatives of the Mexican and Texan governments negotiating for control until Texas, having become a U.S. state in 1845, irrevocably took control in 1846. During this interregnum, 1836–1848, Americans nonetheless continued to settle the region. As early as the mid-1840s, alongside long extant Hispanic settlements such as the Rancho de Juan María Ponce de León, Anglo-American settlers such as Simeon Hart and Hugh Stephenson had established thriving communities of American settlers owing allegiance to Texas. Stephenson, who had married into the local Hispanic aristocracy, established the Rancho de San José de la Concordia, which became the nucleus of Anglo-American and Hispanic settlement within the limits of modern-day El Paso, in 1844: the Republic of Texas, which claimed the area, wanted a chunk of the Santa Fe trade. During the Mexican–American War, the Battle of El Bracito was fought nearby on Christmas Day, 1846. The Treaty of Guadalupe Hidalgo effectively made the settlements on the north bank of the river part of the US, separate from Old El Paso del Norte on the Mexican side. The present New Mexico–Texas boundary placing El Paso on the Texas side was drawn in the Compromise of 1850.

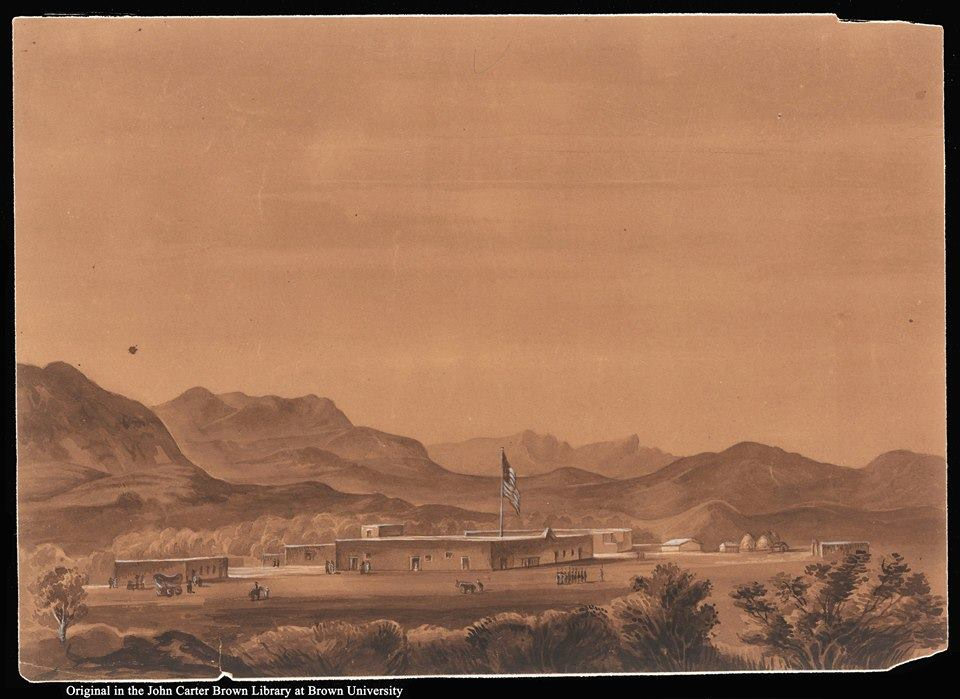
Adobe buildings in "Franklin" c. 1850. Thought to be one of the earliest depictions of the settlement

El Paso remained the largest settlement in New Mexico as part of the Republic of Mexico until its cession to the U.S. in 1848, when the Treaty of Guadalupe Hidalgo specified the border was to run north of El Paso De Norte around the Ciudad Juárez Cathedral which became part of the state of Chihuahua.

El Paso County was established in March 1850, with San Elizario as the first county seat. The United States Senate fixed a boundary between Texas and New Mexico at the 32nd parallel, thus largely ignoring history and topography. A military post called the "Post opposite El Paso" (meaning opposite El Paso del Norte, across the Rio Grande) was established in 1849 on Coons' Rancho beside the settlement of Franklin, which became the nucleus of the future El Paso, Texas; after the army left in 1851, the rancho went into default and was repossessed; in 1852, a post office was established on the rancho bearing the name El Paso as an example of cross-border town naming until El Paso del Norte was renamed Juarez in 1888. After changing hands twice more, the El Paso company was set up in 1859 and bought the property, hiring Anson Mills to survey and lay out the town, thus forming the current street plan of downtown El Paso.

In Beyond the Mississippi (1867), Albert D. Richardson, traveling to California via coach, described El Paso as he found it in late 1859:

"The Texan town of El Paso had four hundred inhabitants, chiefly Mexicans. Its businessmen were Americans, but Spanish was the prevailing language. All the features were Mexican: low, flat adobe buildings, shading cottonwoods under which dusky, smoking women and swarthy children sold fruit, vegetables, and bread; habitual gambling universal, from the boys' game of pitching quartillas (three-cent coins) to the great saloons where huge piles of silver dollars were staked at monte. In this little village, a hundred thousand dollars often changed hands in a single night through the potent agencies of Monte and poker. There were only two or three American ladies, and most of the whites kept Mexican mistresses. All goods were brought on wagons from the Gulf of Mexico and sold at an advance of three or four hundred percent on Eastern prices.

From hills overlooking the town, the eye takes in a charming picture—a far-stretching valley, enriched with orchards, vineyards, and cornfields, through which the river traces a shining pathway. Across it appears the flat roofs and cathedral towers of the old Mexican El Paso; still further, dim misty mountains melt into the blue sky."

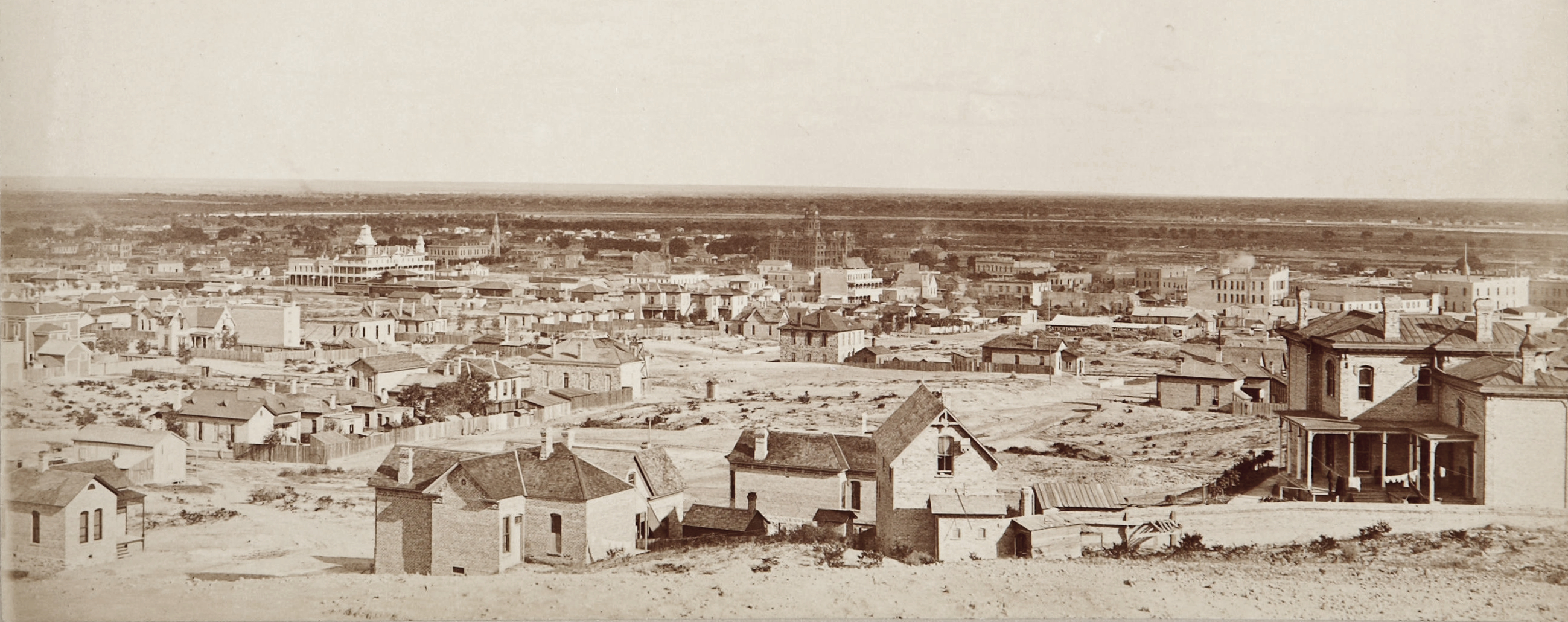
El Paso, c. 1880

During the Civil War, Confederate military forces were in the area until it was captured by the Union California Column in August 1862. It was then headquarters for the 5th Regiment California Volunteer Infantry from August 1863 until December 1864.

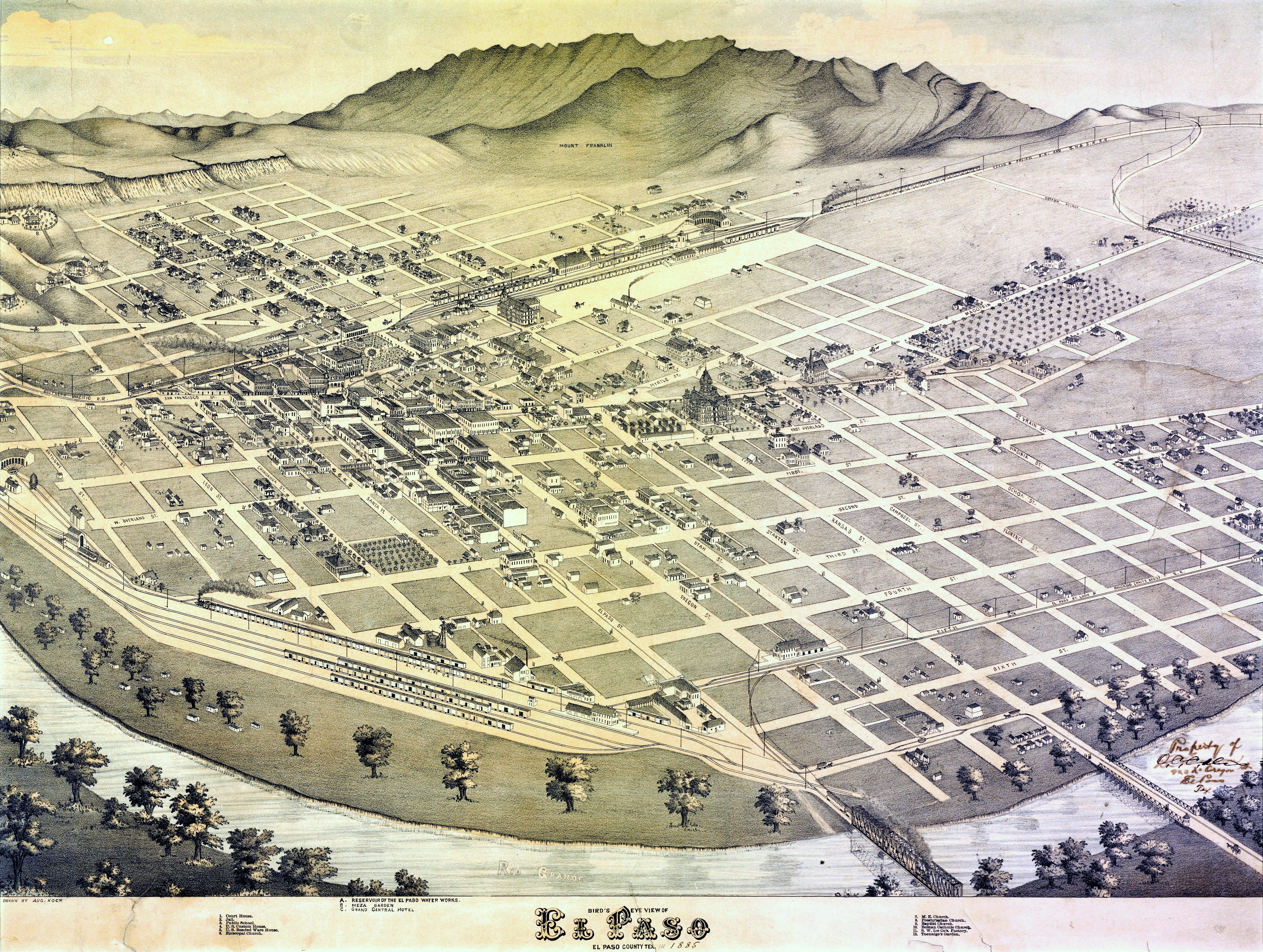
Map of the city in 1886

After the Civil War's conclusion, the town's population began to grow as white Texans continued to move into the villages and soon became the majority. El Paso itself, incorporated in 1873, encompassed the small area of communities that had developed along the river. In the 1870s, a population of 23 non-Hispanic Whites and 150 Hispanics was reported. With the arrival of the Southern Pacific, Texas and Pacific, and Atchison, Topeka and Santa Fe railroads in 1881, the population boomed to 10,000 by the 1890 census, with many Anglo-Americans, recent immigrants, old Hispanic settlers, and recent arrivals from Mexico. The location of El Paso and the arrival of these wilder newcomers caused the city to become a violent and wild boomtown known as the "Six-shooter Capital" because of its lawlessness. Indeed, prostitution and gambling flourished until World War I when the Department of the Army pressured El Paso authorities to crack down on vice (thus "benefitting" vice in neighboring Ciudad Juárez). With the suppression of the vice trade and in consideration of the city's geographic position, the city continued into developing as a premier manufacturing, transportation, and retail center of the U.S. Southwest.

=== 1900–present ===
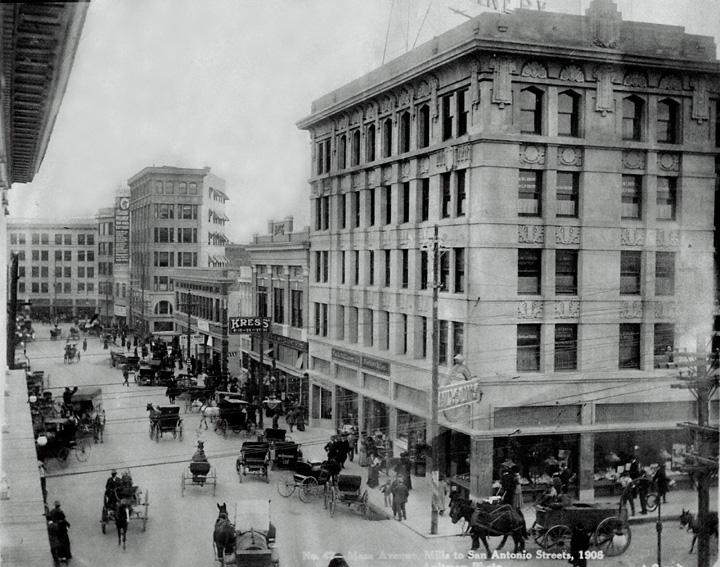
Downtown El Paso in 1908

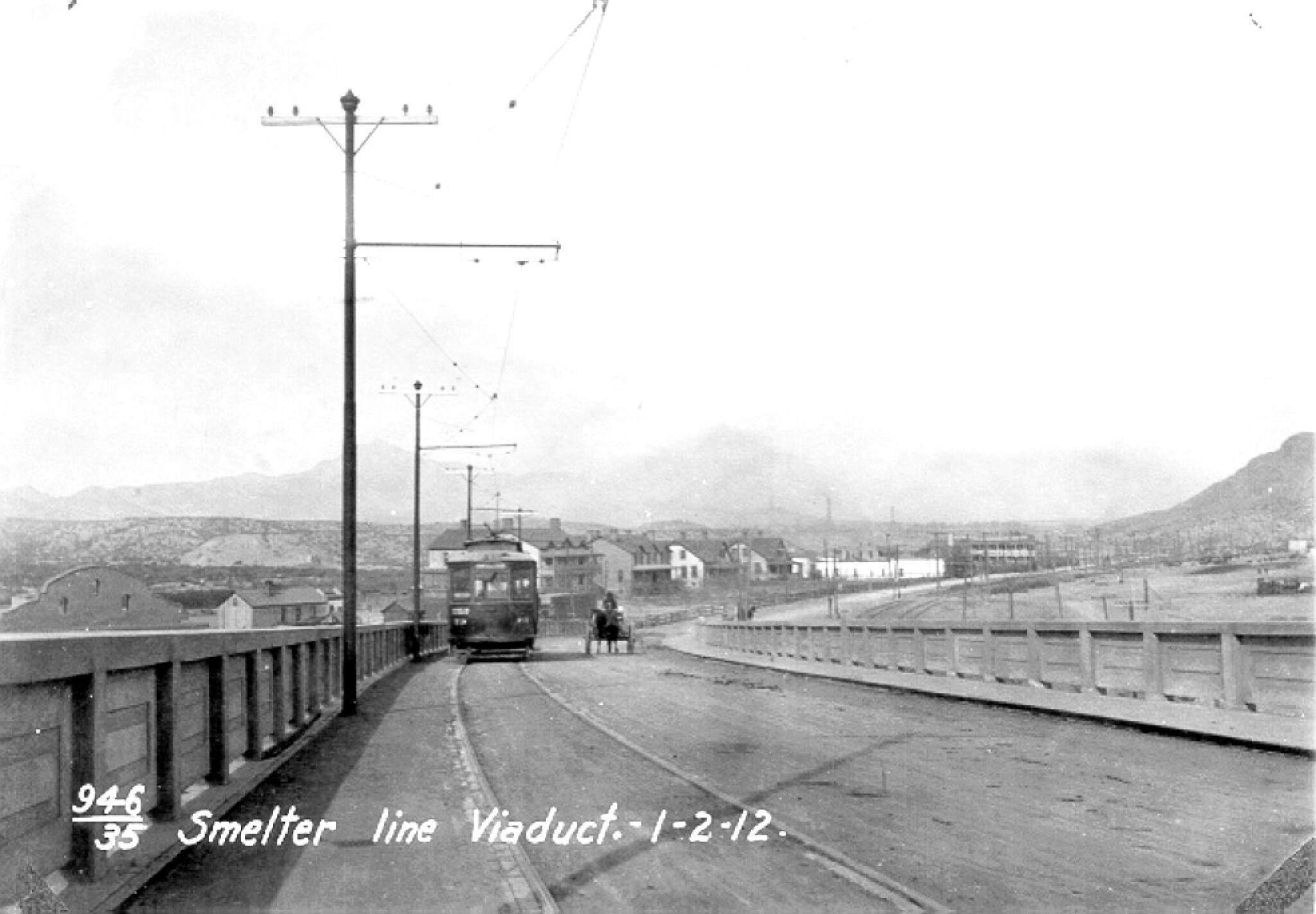
El Paso Electric Railway traveling from Smeltertown in 1912

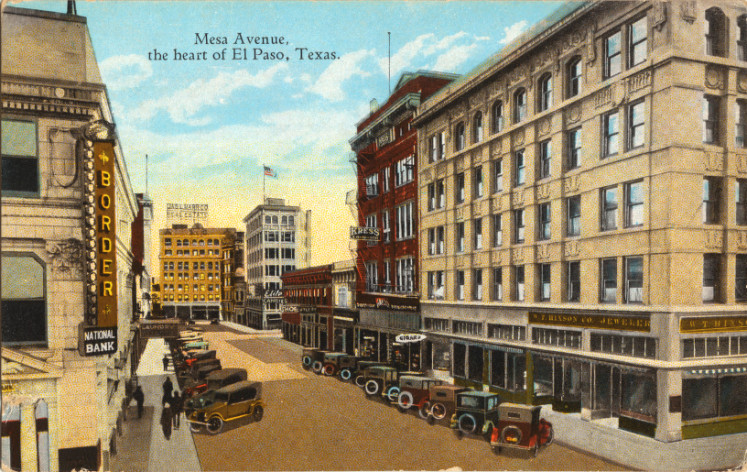
Mesa Avenue, the heart of El Paso, Texas (postcard, c. 1917)

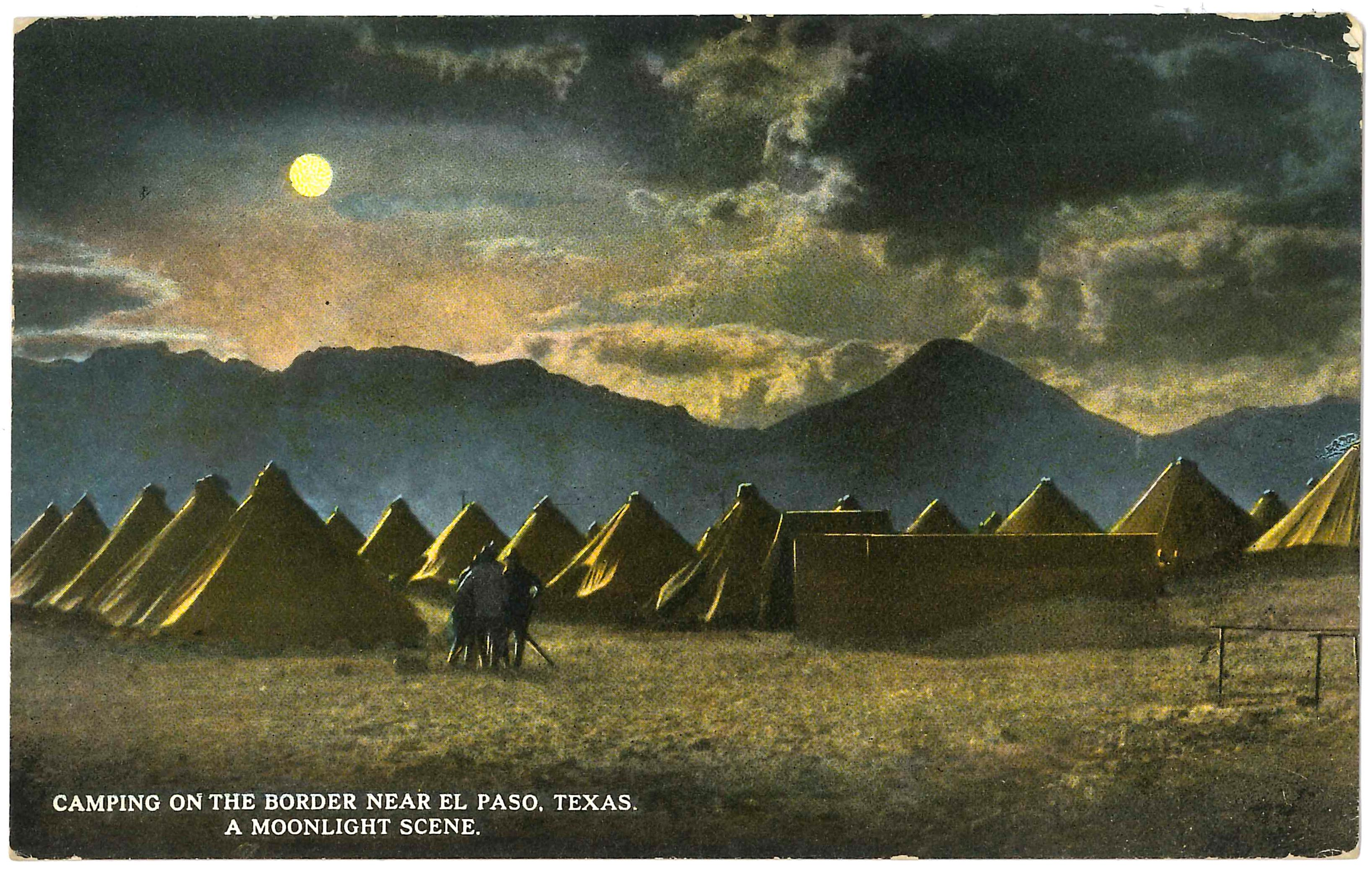
General Pershing's punitive expedition camp near the border, El Paso, Texas (postcard, c. 1916): Franklin Mountains, left-to-right (i.e., south-to-north) are: Ranger Peak, Sugarloaf Mountain, and part of South Franklin Mountain

In 1909, the El Paso Chamber of Commerce hosted U.S. President William Howard Taft and Mexican President Porfirio Díaz at a planned summit in El Paso, Texas, and Ciudad Juárez, Mexico, a historic first meeting between the Presidents of the two countries, and also the first time an American President crossed the border into Mexico. However, tensions rose on both sides of the border, including threats of assassination; so the Texas Rangers, 4,000 U.S. and Mexican troops, U.S. Secret Service agents, FBI agents, and U.S. marshals were all called in to provide security. Frederick Russell Burnham, a celebrated scout, was put in charge of a 250-strong private security detail hired by John Hays Hammond, who in addition to owning large investments in Mexico, was a close friend of Taft from Yale and a U.S. vice presidential candidate in 1908. On October 16, the day of the summit, Burnham and Private C.R. Moore, a Texas Ranger, discovered a man holding a concealed palm pistol standing at the Chamber of Commerce building along the procession route in El Paso. Burnham and Moore captured, disarmed, and arrested the assassin within only a few feet of Taft and Díaz. By 1910, an overwhelming number of people in the city were Americans, creating a settled environment, but this period was short-lived as the Mexican Revolution greatly impacted the city, bringing an influx of refugees—and capital—to the bustling boom town. Spanish-language newspapers, theaters, movie houses, and schools were established, many supported by a thriving Mexican refugee middle class. Large numbers of clerics, intellectuals, and businessmen took refuge in the city, particularly between 1913 and 1915. Ultimately, the violence of the Mexican Revolution followed the large Mexican diaspora, who had fled to El Paso. In 1915 and again in 1916 and 1917, various Mexican revolutionary societies planned, staged, and launched violent attacks against both Texans and their political Mexican opponents in El Paso. This state of affairs eventually led to the vast Plan de San Diego, which resulted in the murder of 21 American citizens. The subsequent reprisals by a local militia soon caused an escalation of violence, wherein an estimated 300 Mexicans and Mexican-Americans lost their lives. These actions affected almost every resident of the entire Rio Grande Valley, resulting in millions of dollars of losses; the result of the Plan of San Diego was long-standing enmity between the two ethnic groups.

Simultaneously, other Texans and Americans gravitated to the city, and by 1920, along with the U.S. Army troops, the population exceeded 100,000, and non-Hispanic Whites once again were in the clear majority. Nonetheless, the city increased the segregation between Mexicans and Mexican-Americans with non-Hispanic Whites. One prominent form of segregation, in the form of immigration controls to prevent disease, allegedly was abused to create nonconsensual pornographic images of women distributed in local bars. These rumors along with the perceived hazard from kerosene baths led to the 1917 Bath riots. As a result of the increased segregation, the Catholic Church attempted to garner the Mexican-American community's allegiance through education and political and civic involvement organizations, including the National Catholic Welfare Fund. In 1916, the Census Bureau reported El Paso's population as 53% Mexican and 44% Non-Hispanic whites. Mining and other industries gradually developed in the area. The El Paso and Northeastern Railway was chartered in 1897, to help extract the natural resources of surrounding areas, especially in southeastern New Mexico Territory. The 1920s and 1930s had the emergence of major business development in the city, partially enabled by Prohibition-era bootlegging. The military demobilization, and agricultural economic depression, which hit places like El Paso first before the larger Great Depression was felt in the big cities, though, hit the city hard. In turn, as in the rest of the United States, the Depression era overall hit the city hard, and El Paso's population declined through the end of World War II, with most of the population losses coming from the non-Hispanic White community. Nonetheless, they remained the majority to the 1940s.

During and following the war, military expansion in the area, as well as oil discoveries in the Permian Basin, helped to engender rapid economic expansion in the mid-1900s. Copper smelting, oil refining, and the proliferation of low-wage industries (particularly garment making) led to the city's growth. Additionally, the departure of the region's rural population, which was mostly non-Hispanic White, to cities like El Paso, brought a short-term burst of capital and labor, but this was balanced by additional departures of middle-class Americans to other parts of the country that offered new and better-paying jobs. In turn, local businesses looked south to the opportunities afforded by cheap Mexican labor. Furthermore, the period from 1942 to 1956 had the bracero program, which brought cheap Mexican labor into the rural area to replace the losses of the non-Hispanic White population. In turn, seeking better-paying jobs, these migrants also moved to El Paso. By 1965, Hispanics once again were a majority. Meanwhile, the postwar expansion slowed again in the 1960s, but the city continued to grow with the annexation of surrounding neighborhoods and in large part because of its significant economic relationship with Mexico.

The Farah Strike, 1972–1974, occurred in El Paso, Texas. This strike was originated and led by Chicanas, or Mexican-American women, against the Farah Manufacturing Company, due to complaints against the company inadequately compensating workers. Texas Monthly described the Farah Strike as the "strike of the century".

On August 3, 2019, Patrick Crusius, a terrorist shooter espousing white supremacy, killed 23 people and injured 22 others at a Walmart. Most of the victims were of Latino or Hispanic descent. It’s the second deadliest mass shooting in Texas history, tied with the 1991 Luby’s shooting, with both shootings behind only the 2017 Sutherland Springs Texas Church shooting.

== Geography ==
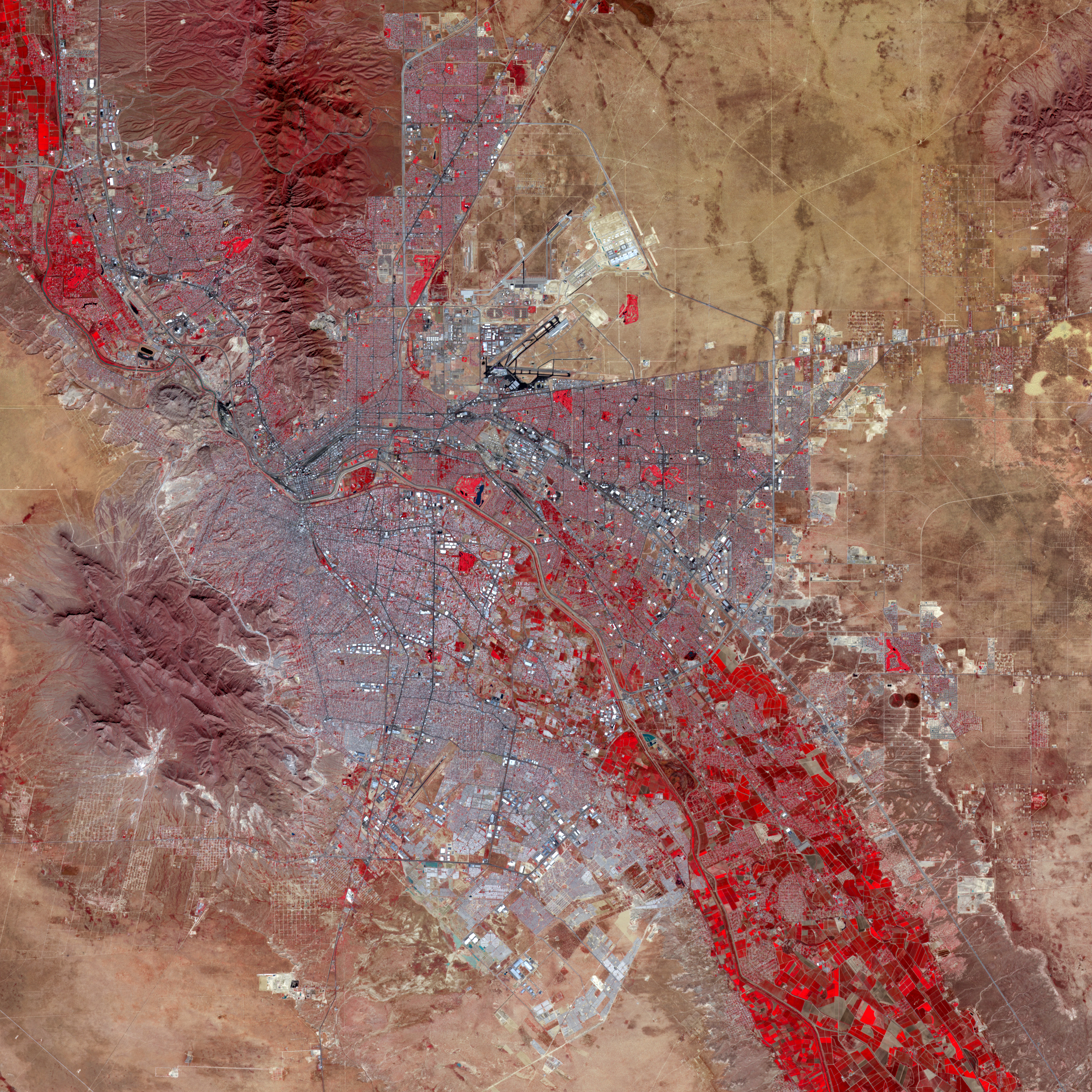
False-color satellite image of El Paso (upper right) and Ciudad Juárez (lower left): Paved streets and buildings appear in varying shades of blue-gray, and red indicates vegetation.

El Paso is located at the intersection of three states (Chihuahua, New Mexico, and Texas) and two countries (Mexico and the U.S.). It is the only major Texas city in the Mountain Time Zone. Ciudad Juarez was once in the Central Time Zone, but both cities are now on Mountain Time. El Paso is closer to the capital cities of four other states: Phoenix, Arizona (430 miles or 690 kilometers away); Santa Fe, New Mexico (273 miles or 439 kilometers away); Ciudad Chihuahua, Chihuahua, (218 miles or 351 kilometers away), and Hermosillo, Sonora (325 miles or 523 kilometers away)—than it is to the capital of its own state, Austin (528 miles or 850 kilometers away). It is closer to Los Angeles, California (700 miles or 1,100 kilometers away) than it is to Orange, Texas (858 miles or 1,381 kilometers away), the easternmost town in the same state as this city.

El Paso is located within the Chihuahuan Desert, the easternmost section of the Basin and Range Region. The Franklin Mountains extend into El Paso from the north and nearly divide the city into two sections; the west side forms the beginnings of the Mesilla Valley, and the east side expands into the desert and lower valley. They connect in the central business district at the southern end of the mountain range.

The city's elevation is 3,740 ft (1,140 m) above sea level. North Franklin Mountain is the highest peak in the city at 7,192 ft (2,192 m) above sea level. The peak can be seen from 60 mi (100 km) in all directions. Additionally, this mountain range is home to the famous natural red-clay formation, the Thunderbird, from which the local Coronado High School gets its mascot's name. According to the United States Census Bureau, the city has a total area of 256.3 sq mi (663.7 km^{2}).

The 24,000-acre (9,700 ha) Franklin Mountains State Park, one of the largest urban parks in the United States, lies entirely in El Paso, extending from the north and dividing the city into several sections along with Fort Bliss and El Paso International Airport.

The Rio Grande Rift, which passes around the southern end of the Franklin Mountains, is where the Rio Grande flows. The river defines the border between El Paso and Ciudad Juárez to the south and west until the river turns north of the border with Mexico, separating El Paso from Doña Ana County, New Mexico. Mt. Cristo Rey, an example of a pluton, rises within the Rio Grande Rift just to the west of El Paso on the New Mexico side of the Rio Grande. Nearby volcanic features include Kilbourne Hole and Hunt's Hole, which are Maar volcanic craters 30 miles (50 km) west of the Franklin Mountains.

On November 8, 2023, a 5.3 magnitude Earthquake struck the El Paso region. The epicenter of the earthquake was 22 miles (35 kilometers) southwest of Mentone, according to the USGS

=== Cityscape ===
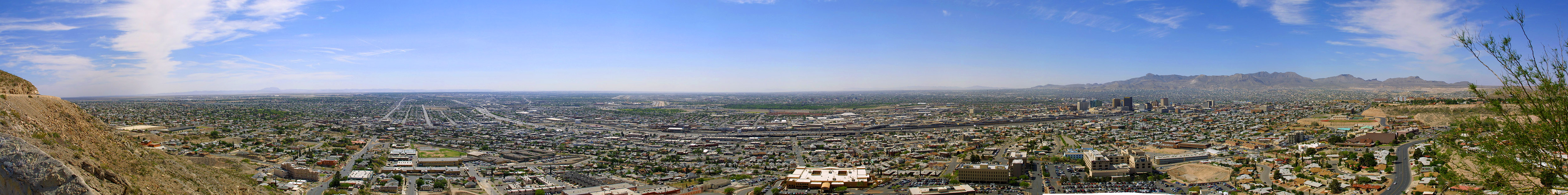
A panoramic view of El Paso, looking northeast through south, near Scenic Drive. The Hueco Mountains can be seen toward the east, and Downtown El Paso can be seen to the south (far right of the image).

==== Tallest buildings ====
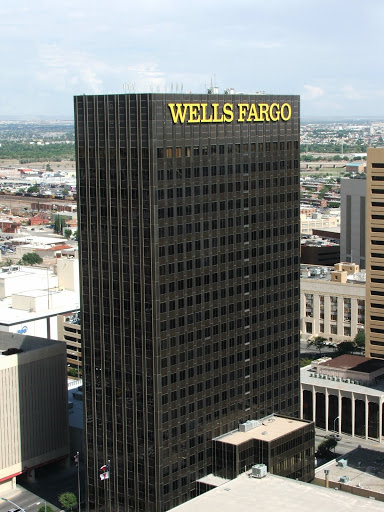
Wells Fargo Plaza

Rank	Building	Height	Floors	Built
1	WestStar Tower	314 ft (96 m)	20	2021
2	Wells Fargo Plaza	302 ft (92 m)	21	1971
3	One San Jacinto Plaza	280 ft (85 m)	20	1962
4	Stanton Tower	260 ft (79 m)	18	1982
5	Plaza Hotel	246 ft (75 m)	19	1930
6	Hotel Paso del Norte Tower	230 ft (70 m)	17	1986
7	El Paso County Courthouse	230 ft (70 m)	14	1991
8	Blue Flame Building	230 ft (70 m)	18	1954
9	O. T. Bassett Tower – Aloft Hotel	216 ft (66 m)	15	1930
10	One Texas Tower	205 ft (62 m)	15	1921
11	Albert Armendariz Sr. U.S. Federal Courthouse	205 ft (62 m)	9	2010

El Paso's second-tallest building, the Wells Fargo Plaza, was built in the early 1970s as State National Plaza. The black-windowed, 302-foot (92 m) building is famous for its 13 white horizontal lights (18 lights per row on the east and west sides of the building, and seven bulbs per row on the north and south sides) that were lit at night. The tower did use a design of the United States flag during the July 4 holidays, as well as the American hostage crisis of 1980, and was lit continuously following the September 11 attacks in 2001 until around 2006. During the Christmas holidays, a design of a Christmas tree was used, and at times, the letters "UTEP" were used to support University of Texas at El Paso athletics. The tower is now only lit during the holiday months, or when special events take place in the city.

==== Neighborhoods ====
===== Downtown and central El Paso =====
This part of town contains some of the city's oldest and most historic neighborhoods. Located in the heart of the city, it is home to about 44,993 people. Development of the area started in 1827 with the first resident, Juan Maria Ponce de Leon, a wealthy merchant from Paso del Norte (present-day Ciudad Juárez), who built the region's first structure establishing Rancho Ponce within the vicinity of S. El Paso Street and Paisano Dr. when the city was barely beginning. Today, central El Paso has grown into the center of the city's economy and a thriving urban community. It contains numerous historic sites and landmarks, many in the Sunset Heights district. Other historic districts in this area include the Rio Grade Avenue Historic District, Segundo Barrio Historic District, and the Magoffin Historic District. It is close to the El Paso International Airport, the international border, and Fort Bliss. It is part of the El Paso Independent School District.

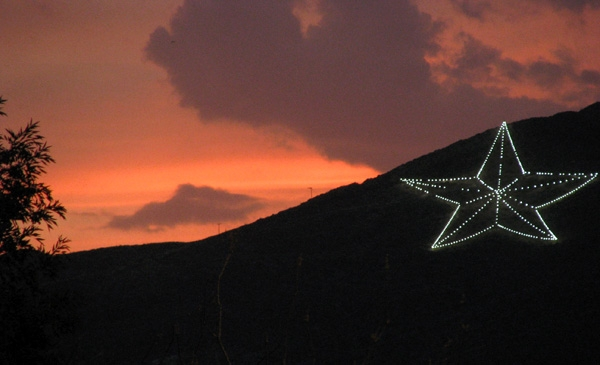
A large, illuminated star on Franklin Mountains has become an informal symbol of El Paso.

Dr. James Day, an El Paso historian, said that downtown's main business area was originally centered between Second Avenue (now Paisano Drive) and San Francisco Avenue. At a later point, the main business area was centered around Stanton Street and Santa Fe Street. In the late 1800s, most of the White American residents lived to the north of the non-White areas, living in brick residences along Magoffin, Myrtle, and San Antonio Avenues. Hispanic-American residents lived in an area called Chihuahuita ("little Chihuahua"), which was located south of Second Avenue and west of Santa Fe Street. Several African Americans and around 300 Chinese Americans also lived in Chihuahuita. Many of the Chinese Americans participated in the building of railroads in the El Paso area. Another downtown neighborhood is El Segundo Barrio, which is near the Mexico–U.S. border.

===== Northwest El Paso =====
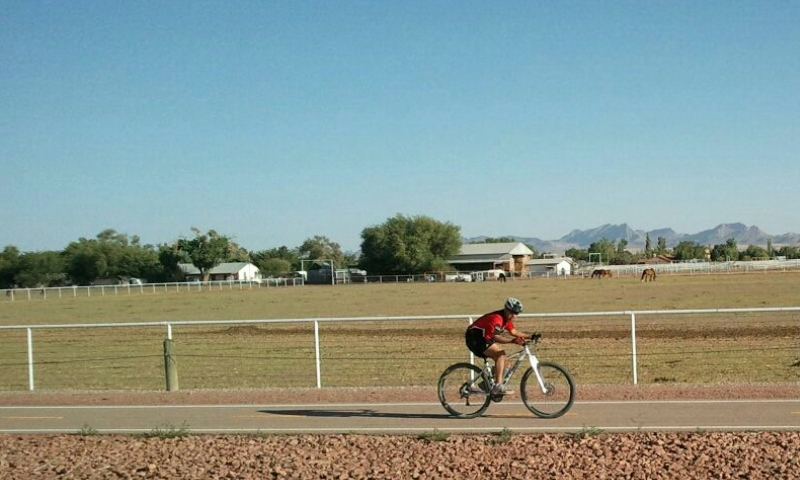
El Paso's upper valley in northwest El Paso

Better known as West El Paso or the West Side, the area includes a portion of the Rio Grande floodplain upstream from downtown, which is known locally as the Upper Valley and is located on the west side of the Franklin Mountains. The Upper Valley is the greenest part of the county due to the Rio Grande. The West Side is home to some of the most affluent neighborhoods within the city, such as the Coronado Hills, Country Club, and Three Hills neighborhoods. It is one of the fastest-growing areas of El Paso. The main high schools in the westside include Canutillo High School, Coronado High School (El Paso, Texas), and Franklin High School (El Paso, Texas).

===== West-central El Paso =====
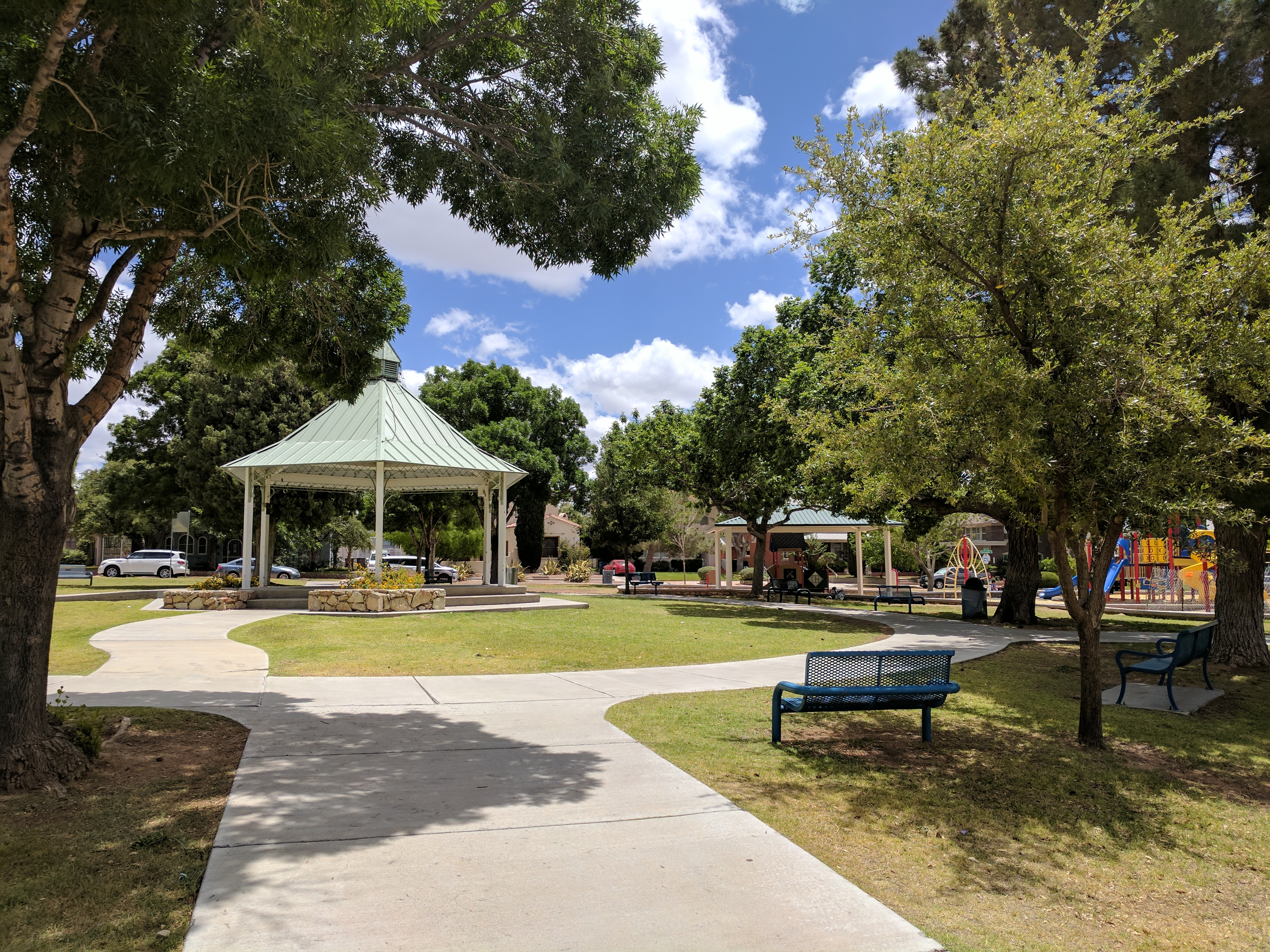
Madeline Park in Kern Place

West-central El Paso is located north of Interstate 10 and west of the Franklin Mountains. The University of Texas at El Paso (UTEP) and the Cincinnati Entertainment district are located in the heart of the area. Historic districts Kern Place and Sunset Heights are in this part of town.

Kern Place was founded in 1914 by Peter E. Kern, for whom the neighborhood was named. The homes of Kern Place are unique in architecture and some were built by residents themselves. One of the better known homes is the Paul Luckett Home located at 1201 Cincinnati Ave. above Madeline Park, and is made of local rock. It is known as "The Castle" due to its round walls and a crenelated rooftop.

Kern Place is extremely popular with college and university students. The area is known for its glitzy entertainment district, restaurants and coffee shops that cater to both business patrons and university students. After UTEP's basketball and football games, UTEP fans pack the Kern Place area for food and entertainment at Cincinnati Street, a small bar district. This bar scene has grown over the years and has attracted thousands to its annual Mardi Gras block party, as well as after sporting events or concerts. Young men and women make up the majority of the crowds who stop in between classes or after work.

Sunset Heights is one of the most historic areas in town, which has existed since the latter part of the 1890s. Many wealthy residents have had their houses and mansions built on this hill. Although some buildings have been renovated to their former glory, many have been neglected and have deteriorated. During the Mexican Revolution widely popular revolutionary leader Pancho Villa owned and resided in this area during the 1910s. During the 1910 Mexican Revolution many Mexicans fled Mexico and settled in Sunset Heights.

===== Northeast El Paso =====
This part of town is located north of central El Paso and east of the Franklin Mountains. Development of the area was extensive during the 1950s and 1960s. It is one of the more ethnically diverse areas in the city due to the concentration of military families. The Northeast has not developed as rapidly as other areas, such as east El Paso and northwest El Paso, but its development is steadily increasing. The population is expected to grow more rapidly as a result of the troop increase at Ft. Bliss in the coming years. The area has also gained recognition throughout the city for the outstanding high-school athletic programs at Andress High School, Parkland High School, Irvin High School, and Chapin High School.

In May 2021 a major developer announced plans for a Master Planned Community in the Northeast modeled after Scarborough's Sunfield Master Planned Community in Buda, Texas. The first phase of the development is to include about 2,500 homes, 10-acre park, walking trails, a four-acre resort-like area with a lazy river, kiddy splash pad, pool, grass areas, and a food truck area, the developers reported. Jessica Herrera, director of the city of El Paso Economic and International Development Department, in a statement released by the developers, said Campo del Sol will generate hundreds of millions of dollars in tax revenues, "which will stimulate other growth and development on the north side of town".

===== East El Paso =====
The area is located north of Interstate 10, east of Airway Blvd., and south of Montana Ave. It is the largest and fastest growing area of town with a population over 200,000. It includes the 79936 ZIP Code, which was considered in 2013 as the most populous in the nation with over 114,000 people.

===== Mission Valley =====
Formerly known as the lower valley, it includes part of Eastside and all lower valley districts. It is the third-largest area of the city, behind east El Paso and central El Paso. Hawkins Road and Interstate 10 border the Mission Valley. This location is considered the oldest area of El Paso, dating back to the late 16th century when present-day Texas was under the rule of New Spain.

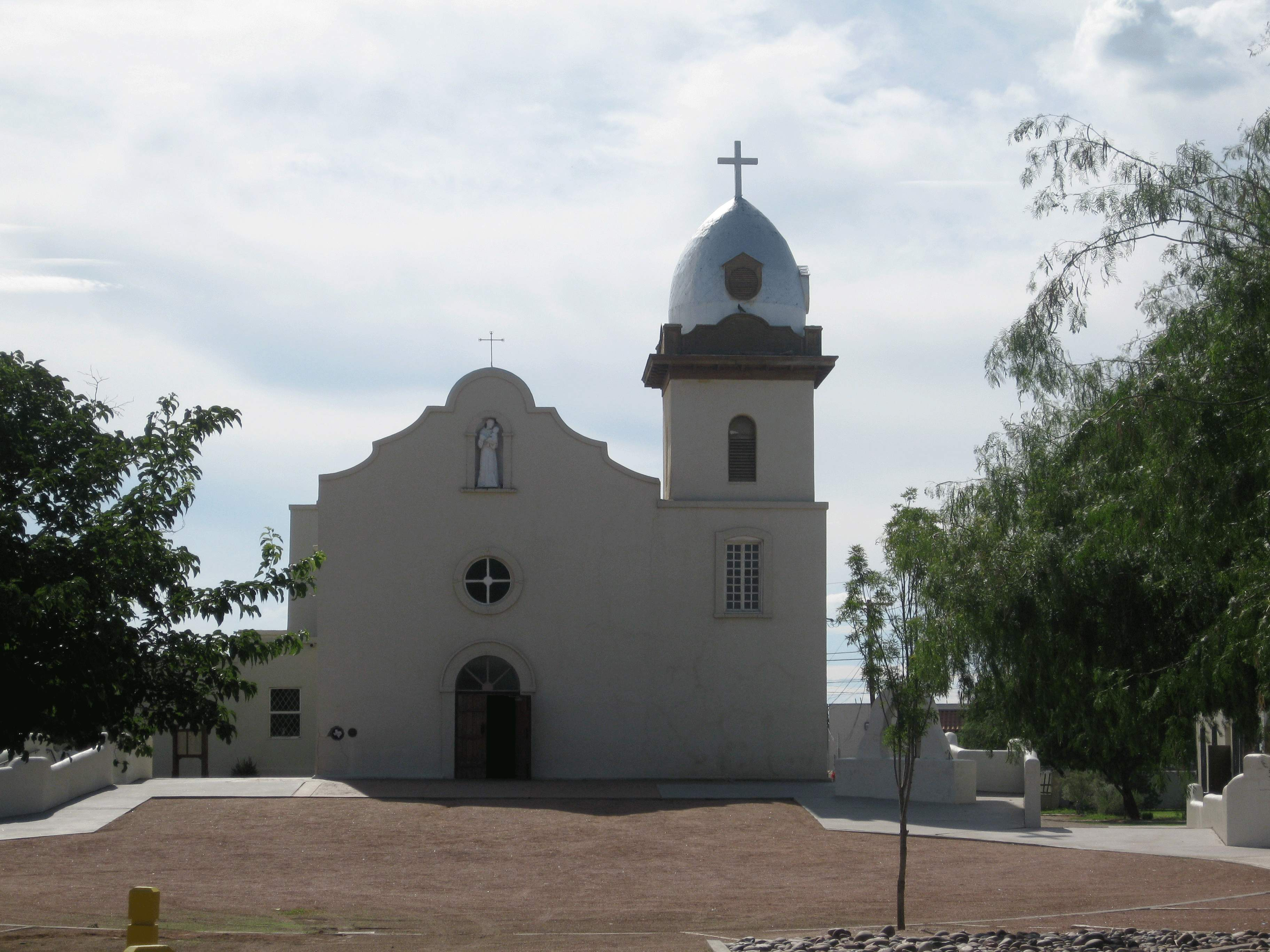
Ysleta Mission

In 1680, the Isleta Pueblo tribe revolted against the Spaniards who were pushed south to what is now El Paso. Some Spaniards and tribe members settled here permanently. Soon afterward, three Spanish missions were built; they remain standing, currently functioning as churches: Ysleta Mission-1682 (La Misión de Corpus Christi y de San Antonio de la Ysleta del Sur/Our Lady of Mt. Carmel), Socorro Mission-1759 (Nuestra Señora de la Purísima Concepción del Socorro)-1759, and San Elizario Chapel (Capilla de San Elcear)-1789.

On April 30, 1598, the northward-bound Spanish conquistadors crossed large sand dunes about 27 miles south of present-day downtown El Paso. The expeditionaries and their horses reportedly ran toward the river, and two horses drank themselves to death. Don Juan de Oñate, a New Spain-born conquistador of Spanish parents, was an expedition leader who ordered a big feast north of the Río Grande in what is now San Elizario. This was the first documented and true Thanksgiving in North America. Oñate declared la Toma (taking possession), claiming all territory north of the Río Grande for King Philip II of Spain.

Ysleta Del Sur Pueblo (related to the insurgent Isleta Pueblo Tribe) is also located in this valley. The Tigua is one of three Indian tribes in Texas whose sovereignty is recognized by the United States government. Ysleta is spelled with a "Y" because 19th-century script did not differentiate between a capital "Y" and a capital "I".

Some people in this area and its twin city across the river, Ciudad Juárez, are direct descendants of the Spaniards.

===== Texas and New Mexico suburbs =====
El Paso is surrounded by many cities and communities in both Texas and New Mexico. The most populated suburbs in Texas are Socorro, Horizon City, Fort Bliss, and San Elizario. Other Texas suburbs are Anthony, Canutillo, Sparks, Fabens, and Vinton.

Although Anthony, Santa Teresa, Sunland Park, and Chaparral lie adjacent to El Paso County, they are considered to be part of the Las Cruces, New Mexico metropolitan area by the United States Census Bureau.

=== Climate ===
El Paso, Texas

Climate chart (precipitation, max. and min. temperature)
J	F	M	A	M	J	J	A	S	O	N	D
0.4 59 35	0.4 64 39	0.2 72 45	0.4 80 53	0.7 89 62	0.9 97 71	1.6 96 73	1.7 94 72	1.5 88 65	0.6 79 54	0.4 67 42	0.6 58 34
- █ Average max. and min. temperatures in °F
- █ Precipitation totals in inches
Metric conversion
J	F	M	A	M	J	J	A	S	O	N	D
10 15 2	10 18 4	5.1 22 7	10 27 12	18 32 17	23 36 22	41 36 23	43 34 22	38 31 18	15 26 12	10 19 6	15 14 1
- █ Average max. and min. temperatures in °C
- █ Precipitation totals in mm

El Paso has a hot desert climate (Köppen BWh) featuring hot summers, with little humidity, and cool to mild, dry winters. Rainfall averages 8.8 in (220 mm) per year, much of which occurs from June through September, and is predominantly caused by the North American Monsoon. During this period, southerly and southeasterly winds carry moisture from the Pacific, the Gulf of California, and the Gulf of Mexico into the region. When this moisture moves into the El Paso area and places to the southwest, orographic lift from the mountains, combined with strong daytime heating, causes thunderstorms, some severe enough to produce flash flooding and hail, across the region.

The sun shines 302 days per year on average in El Paso, 83% of daylight hours, according to the National Weather Service; from this, the city is nicknamed "The Sun City". Due to its arid, windy climate, El Paso often experiences sand and dust storms during the dry season, particularly during the springtime between March and early May. With an average wind speed often exceeding 30 mph (50 km/h) and gusts that have been measured at over 75 mph (120 km/h), these wind storms kick up large amounts of sand and dust from the desert, causing loss of visibility.

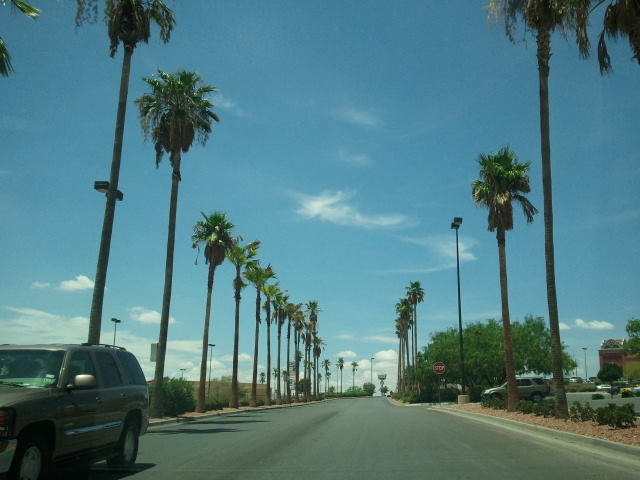
Palm trees in East El Paso

El Paso and the nearby mountains also receive snow. Weather systems have produced over 1 ft (30 cm) of snow on several occasions. In the 1982–1983 winter season, three major snowstorms produced record seasonal snowfall. On December 25–26, 1982, 6.0 in (15 cm) of snow fell, producing a white Christmas for the city. This was followed by another 7.0 in (18 cm) on December 30–31, 1982. On April 4–7, 1983, 16.5 in (42 cm) of snow fell on El Paso, bringing the seasonal total to nearly 30 in (76 cm). On December 13–14, 1987, a record storm dumped over 22 in (56 cm) of snow on El Paso, and two weeks later (December 25–26), another 3 in (7.6 cm) fell, bringing the monthly total for December 1987 to an all-time record high of 25.9 in (66 cm) of snow. The average annual snowfall for the city varies widely between different neighborhoods at different elevations, but is 2.6 in (6.6 cm) at the airport (but with a median of 0, meaning most years see no snow at all). Snow is most rare around Ysleta and the eastern valley area, which usually include large numbers of palm trees; in the higher neighborhoods, palm trees are more vulnerable to snow and cold snaps and are often seen with brown, frost-damaged fronds.

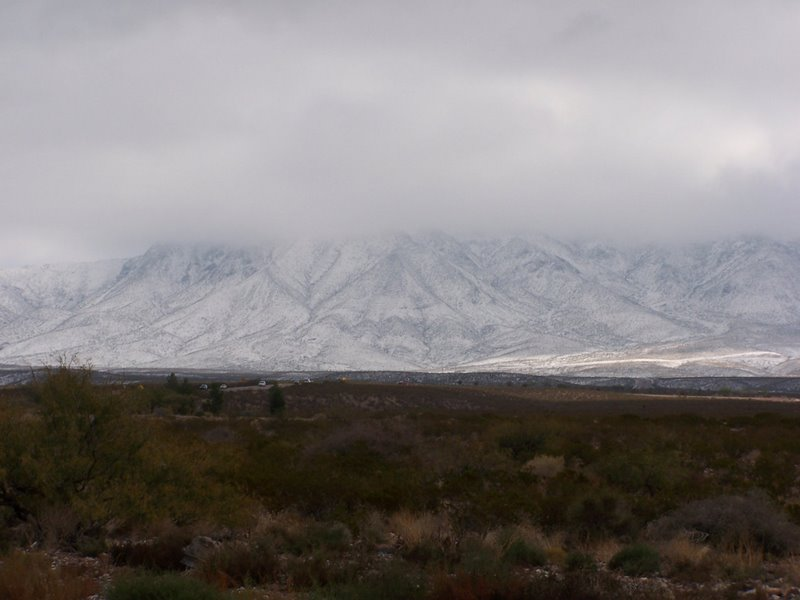
Snow in the Franklin Mountains in west El Paso

One example of El Paso's varying climate at its most extreme was the damaging winter storm of early February 2011, which caused closures of schools, businesses, and City Hall. The snow, which was light, stopped after about a day, but during the ensuing cold episode, municipal utilities went into a crisis. The high temperature on February 2, 2011, was 15 °F (−9 °C), the lowest daily maximum on record. In addition, the low temperature on February 3 was 1 °F (−17 °C), breaking the 5 °F (−15 °C) monthly record low set during the cold wave of 1899. Loss of desert vegetation, such as Mexican/California palm trees, oleanders, and iceplants to the cold weather was one of the results. Two local power plants failed, forcing El Paso Electric to institute rolling blackouts over several days, and electric wires were broken, causing localized blackouts. Many water utility pipes froze, causing areas of the city to be without water for several days.

Monthly means range from 46.1 °F (7.8 °C) in December to 84.4 °F (29.1 °C) in July, but high temperatures typically peak in June before the monsoon arrives, while daily low temperatures typically peak in July or early August with the higher humidity the monsoon brings (translating to warmer nights). On average, 42 night lows are at or below freezing, with 118 days of 90 °F (32 °C)+ highs and 28 days of 100 °F (38 °C)+ highs annually; extremely rarely do temperatures stay below the freezing mark all day. The city's record high is 114 °F (46 °C) on June 30, 1994, and its record low is −8 °F (−22 °C) on January 11, 1962; the highest daily minimum was 85 °F (29 °C) on July 1 and 3, 1994, with weather records for the area maintained by the National Weather Service since 1879.

=== Flooding ===
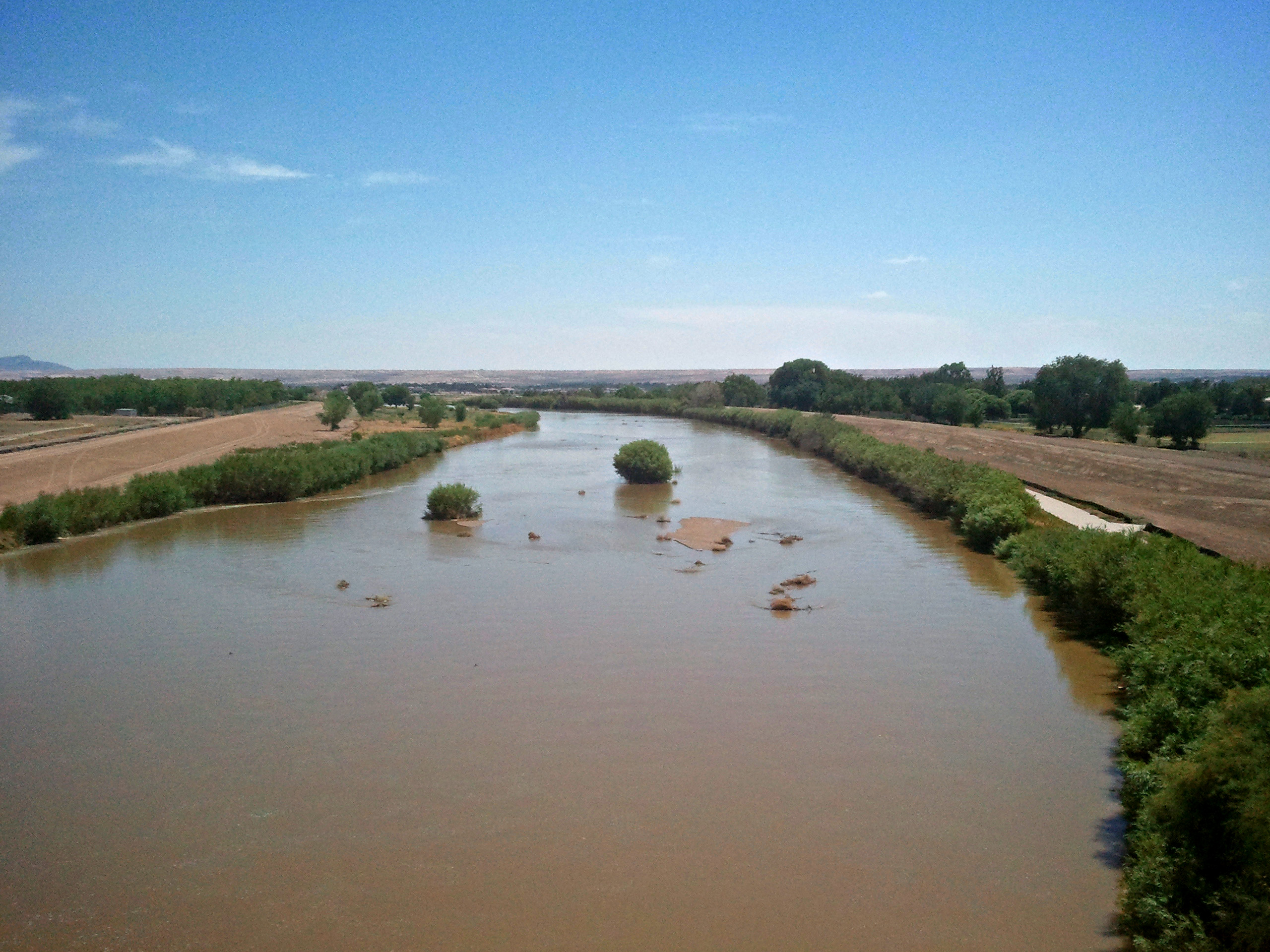
The Rio Grande in west El Paso, near New Mexico–Texas state line

Climate chart for El Paso

Although the average annual rainfall is only about 8.8 in (225 mm), many parts of El Paso are subject to occasional flooding during intense summer monsoonal thunderstorms. In late July and early August 2006, up to 10 in (250 mm) of rain fell in a week, the flood-control reservoirs overflowed and caused major flooding citywide. The city staff estimated damage to public infrastructure at $21 million, and to private property (residential and commercial) at $77 million. Much of the damage was associated with development in recent decades in arroyos protected by flood-control dams and reservoirs, and the absence of any storm drain utility in the city to handle the flow of rain water.

Climate data for El Paso Int'l, Texas (1991–2020 normals, extremes 1879–present) (Note: Official records for El Paso kept January 1879 to June 1947 at downtown and at El Paso Int'l since July 1947. For more information, see Threadex)
Month	Jan	Feb	Mar	Apr	May	Jun	Jul	Aug	Sep	Oct	Nov	Dec	Year
Record high °F (°C)	80 (27)	86 (30)	96 (36)	98 (37)	105 (41)	114 (46)	112 (44)	112 (44)	106 (41)	96 (36)	87 (31)	80 (27)	114 (46)
Mean maximum °F (°C)	71.2 (21.8)	76.9 (24.9)	85.9 (29.9)	90.7 (32.6)	98.7 (37.1)	105.7 (40.9)	103.6 (39.8)	102.5 (39.2)	98.8 (37.1)	90.8 (32.7)	78.5 (25.8)	71.3 (21.8)	106.7 (41.5)
Mean daily maximum °F (°C)	58.6 (14.8)	64.1 (17.8)	71.9 (22.2)	80.0 (26.7)	88.7 (31.5)	97.1 (36.2)	95.8 (35.4)	94.0 (34.4)	88.3 (31.3)	79.4 (26.3)	67.0 (19.4)	57.8 (14.3)	78.6 (25.9)
Daily mean °F (°C)	46.5 (8.1)	51.5 (10.8)	58.7 (14.8)	66.6 (19.2)	75.4 (24.1)	83.9 (28.8)	84.4 (29.1)	82.9 (28.3)	76.9 (24.9)	66.7 (19.3)	54.5 (12.5)	46.1 (7.8)	66.2 (19.0)
Mean daily minimum °F (°C)	34.5 (1.4)	38.9 (3.8)	45.5 (7.5)	53.3 (11.8)	62.1 (16.7)	70.6 (21.4)	73.0 (22.8)	71.8 (22.1)	65.4 (18.6)	54.0 (12.2)	42.0 (5.6)	34.4 (1.3)	53.8 (12.1)
Mean minimum °F (°C)	19.1 (−7.2)	22.6 (−5.2)	27.6 (−2.4)	35.8 (2.1)	46.7 (8.2)	56.6 (13.7)	63.9 (17.7)	62.8 (17.1)	52.6 (11.4)	37.8 (3.2)	25.1 (−3.8)	17.9 (−7.8)	15.6 (−9.1)
Record low °F (°C)	−8 (−22)	1 (−17)	14 (−10)	23 (−5)	31 (−1)	46 (8)	56 (13)	52 (11)	41 (5)	25 (−4)	1 (−17)	−5 (−21)	−8 (−22)
Average precipitation inches (mm)	0.39 (9.9)	0.40 (10)	0.24 (6.1)	0.17 (4.3)	0.43 (11)	0.73 (19)	1.58 (40)	1.67 (42)	1.52 (39)	0.59 (15)	0.43 (11)	0.63 (16)	8.78 (223)
Average snowfall inches (cm)	0.8 (2.0)	0.2 (0.51)	0.0 (0.0)	0.0 (0.0)	0.0 (0.0)	0.0 (0.0)	0.0 (0.0)	0.0 (0.0)	0.0 (0.0)	0.0 (0.0)	0.5 (1.3)	1.3 (3.3)	2.8 (7.1)
Average precipitation days (≥ 0.01 in)	3.3	3.1	2.1	1.4	2.4	3.4	8.1	7.8	5.5	4.1	2.6	3.8	47.6
Average snowy days (≥ 0.1 in)	0.7	0.3	0.0	0.0	0.0	0.0	0.0	0.0	0.0	0.1	0.2	0.8	2.1
Average relative humidity (%)	50.5	41.6	32.4	26.9	27.1	29.9	43.9	48.4	50.5	47.1	46.1	51.5	41.3
Average dew point °F (°C)	23.4 (−4.8)	23.0 (−5.0)	22.8 (−5.1)	25.5 (−3.6)	32.4 (0.2)	41.9 (5.5)	54.9 (12.7)	55.8 (13.2)	51.6 (10.9)	39.9 (4.4)	29.3 (−1.5)	24.6 (−4.1)	35.4 (1.9)
Mean monthly sunshine hours	254.5	263.0	326.0	348.0	384.7	384.1	360.2	335.4	304.1	298.6	257.6	246.3	3,762.5
Percentage possible sunshine	80	85	88	89	90	90	83	81	82	85	82	79	85
Source: NOAA (relative humidity 1962–1990, sun 1961–1990, dew point 1962–1990)

== Demographics ==
Historical population
Year	Pop.	±%
1850	200	—
1860	428	+114.0%
1872	731	+70.8%
1880	736	+0.7%
1890	10,338	+1304.6%
1900	15,906	+53.9%
1910	39,279	+146.9%
1920	77,560	+97.5%
1930	102,421	+32.1%
1940	96,810	−5.5%
1950	130,485	+34.8%
1960	276,687	+112.0%
1970	339,615	+22.7%
1980	425,259	+25.2%
1990	515,342	+21.2%
2000	563,662	+9.4%
2010	649,121	+15.2%
2020	678,815	+4.6%
2024	681,723	+0.4%
U.S. Decennial Census; Texas Almanac: 1850–2000; 2010–2010; El Paso 1850 to 2006; TX State Historical Association

=== Racial and ethnic composition ===
Historical racial profile	2020	2010	2000	1990	1970
Hispanic or Latino	82.8%	80.7%	76.6%	69.0%	57.3% (Note: From 15% sample)
White (non-Hispanic)	12.2%	14.2%	18.3%	26.4%	40.4%
African American or Black	3.1%	3.4%	3.5%	3.4%	2.3%
Asian	1.3%	1.2%	1.5%	1.2%	0.3%

El Paso city, Texas – Racial and ethnic composition Note: the US Census treats Hispanic/Latino as an ethnic category. This table excludes Latinos from the racial categories and assigns them to a separate category. Hispanics/Latinos may be of any race.
Race / Ethnicity (NH = Non-Hispanic)	Pop 2000	Pop 2010	Pop 2020	% 2000	% 2010	% 2020
White alone (NH)	103,422	92,426	83,301	18.35%	14.24%	12.27%
Black or African American alone (NH)	15,768	18,155	21,098	2.80%	2.80%	3.11%
Native American or Alaska Native alone (NH)	1,616	1,633	1,653	0.29%	0.25%	0.24%
Asian alone (NH)	5,874	7,092	9,123	1.04%	1.09%	1.34%
Pacific Islander alone (NH)	378	737	1,195	0.07%	0.11%	0.18%
Some Other Race alone (NH)	460	543	1,985	0.08%	0.08%	0.29%
Mixed race or Multiracial (NH)	4,269	4,814	8,947	0.76%	0.74%	1.32%
Hispanic or Latino (any race)	431,875	523,721	551,513	76.62%	80.68%	81.25%
Total	563,662	649,121	678,815	100.00%	100.00%	100.00%

=== 2020 census ===
As of the 2020 census, El Paso had a population of 678,815. The median age was 35.4 years. 24.5% of residents were under the age of 18 and 14.8% of residents were 65 years of age or older. For every 100 females there were 92.7 males, and for every 100 females age 18 and over there were 89.4 males age 18 and over.

99.4% of residents lived in urban areas, while 0.6% lived in rural areas.

There were 243,598 households in El Paso, of which 36.0% had children under the age of 18 living in them. Of all households, 44.6% were married-couple households, 18.3% were households with a male householder and no spouse or partner present, and 31.7% were households with a female householder and no spouse or partner present. About 24.6% of all households were made up of individuals and 9.7% had someone living alone who was 65 years of age or older. The census counted 162,460 families residing in the city.

There were 261,229 housing units, of which 6.7% were vacant. The homeowner vacancy rate was 1.3% and the rental vacancy rate was 7.7%.

Racial composition as of the 2020 census
Race	Number	Percent
White	250,001	36.8%
Black or African American	25,077	3.7%
American Indian and Alaska Native	7,581	1.1%
Asian	10,347	1.5%
Native Hawaiian and Other Pacific Islander	1,514	0.2%
Some other race	139,967	20.6%
Two or more races	244,328	36.0%
Hispanic or Latino (of any race)	551,513	81.2%

=== 2010 census ===
At the 2010 U.S. census, 649,121 people, 216,694 households, and 131,104 families resided in the city.

The population density was 2,263.0 inhabitants per square mile (873.7/km^{2}) in 2010. There were 227,605 housing units at an average density of 777.5 per square mile (300.2/km^{2}). Of the 216,894 households in 2010, 37.6% had children under 18 living with them, 48.5% were married couples living together, 20.7% had a female householder with no husband present, and 25.3% were not families. About 21.5% of all households were made up of individuals, and 24.9% had someone living alone who was 65 years of age or older. The average household size was 2.95 and the average family size was 3.47.

In the city, the age distribution was 29.1% under the age of 18, 7.5% from 20 to 24, 26.2% from 25 to 44, 22.8% from 45 to 64, and 11.1% who were 65 or older. The median age was 32.5 years according to census statistics from 2010.

As of 2010, the median income for a household in the city was $44,431, and for a family was $50,247. Males had a median income of $28,989 versus $21,540 for females. The per capita income for the city was $21,120. About 17.3% of families and 20.3% of the population were below the poverty line, including 28.5% of those under age 18 and 18.4% of those age 65 or over.

=== 2019 estimates ===
The 2019 U.S. Census Bureau estimates determined El Paso had a population of 681,728, an increase of 5.2% since the 2010 census. The 226,787 households in 2019 averaged 2.97 people per household.

The 2019 census estimates determined the city had an owner-occupied housing rate of 58.9% and median value of owner-occupied housing units at $127,400. The median gross rent from 2015 to 2019 was $837. From 2015 to 2019, the city's median monthly homeowner cost with a mortgage was $1,255 and without a mortgage $429. El Paso had a median household income of $47,568 and per capita income of $22,734 in 2019. Roughly 19% of the population lived at or below the poverty line.

=== German communities ===
By 1996, a German community existed in El Paso, as the German Air Force headquarters for North America is in El Paso. A German school in El Paso serves all grade levels, though as of 1996, most of its students begin attending American schools at the secondary level. The German school is on Fort Bliss.

=== Religion ===
Christianity is the largest religion in the city and its metropolitan statistical area. Nearly 45% of its population claimed affiliation with the Catholic Church in 2020; they are served by the Roman Catholic Diocese of El Paso. Protestants form a minority of Christians in the city limits, and the remainder of the non-Christian population were followers of Judaism, Islam, or eastern faiths, including Buddhism or Hinduism. The irreligious made the second largest non-Christian group.

== Economy ==
Largest Employers in El Paso
#	Employer	Number of Employees
1	Fort Bliss	47,628
2	El Paso Independent School District	7,875
3	Socorro Independent School District	7,195
4	City of El Paso	6,840
5	T&T Staff Management	6,187
6	Ysleta Independent School District	6,022
7	The Hospitals of Providence	5,300
8	University of Texas at El Paso	3,170
9	El Paso Community College	3,102
10	El Paso County	2,980
11	University Medical Center	2,800
12	DATAMARK Inc.	2,800
13	Alorica	2,500
14	GC Services Lp	2,250
15	Las Palmas Del Sol Healthcare	2,184

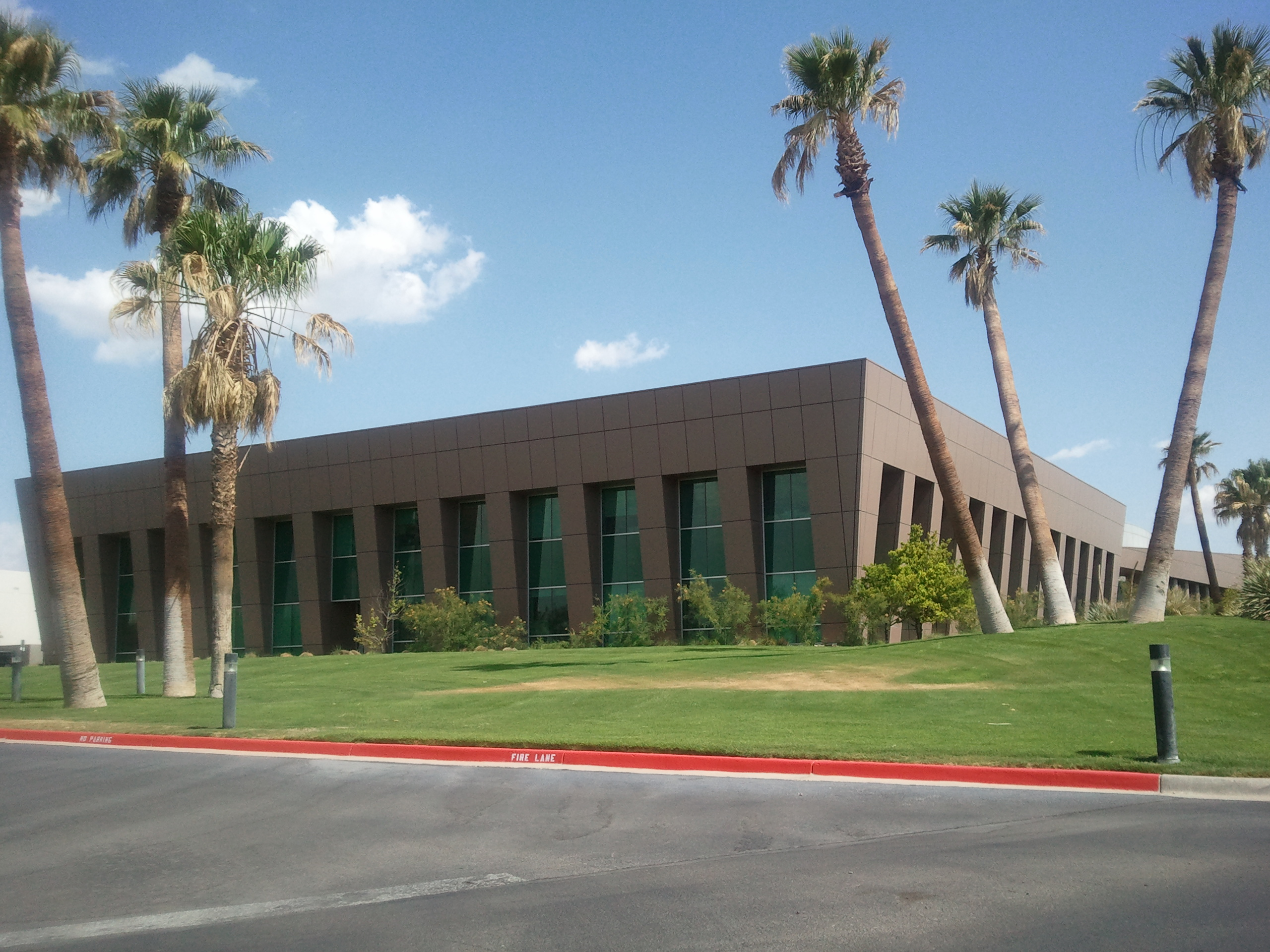
Helen of Troy Limited corporate office

El Paso has a diversified economy focused primarily within international trade, military, government civil service, oil and gas, health care, tourism, and service sectors. The El Paso metro area had a GDP of $29.03 billion in 2017. There was also $92 billion worth of trade in 2012. Over the past 15 years the city has become a significant location for American-based call centers. Cotton, fruit, vegetables, and livestock are also produced in the area. El Paso has added a significant manufacturing sector with items and goods produced that include petroleum, metals, medical devices, plastics, machinery, defense-related goods, and automotive parts. On July 22, 2020, Amazon announced plans to open the first 625,000 square foot fulfillment center in El Paso. Owing to its location on a border, the city is the second-busiest international crossing point in the U.S. behind San Diego.

El Paso is home to one Fortune 500 company, Western Refining, which is listed on the New York Stock Exchange (NYSE). This makes the city one of six Texas metro areas to have at least one Fortune 500 company call it home; the others being Houston, Dallas-Fort Worth, San Antonio, Austin, and Corpus Christi. The second publicly traded company is Helen of Troy Limited, a NASDAQ-listed company that manufactures personal health-care products under many labels, such as OXO, Dr. Scholl's, Vidal Sassoon, Pert Plus, Brut, and Sunbeam, and the third is El Paso Electric listed on the NYSE, a public utility engaging in the generation, transmission, and distribution of electricity in West Texas and southern New Mexico. The fourth publicly traded company is Western Refining Logistics, also traded in the NYSE. It is a Western Refining subsidiary, which owns, operates, develops, and acquires terminals, storage tanks, pipelines, and other logistics assets.

More than 70 Fortune 500 companies have offices in El Paso, including AT&T, ADP, Boeing, Charles Schwab, Delphi, Dish Network, Eureka, Hoover, Raytheon, USAA and Verizon Wireless. Hispanic Business Magazine included 28 El Paso companies in its list of the 500 largest Hispanic owned businesses in the United States. El Paso's 28 companies are second only to Miami's 57. The list of the largest Hispanic owned businesses includes companies like Fred Loya Insurance, a Hispanic 500 company and the 18th largest Hispanic business in the nation. Other companies on the list are Dos Lunas Spirits, Dynatec Labs, Spira Footwear, DATAMARK, Inc. and El Taco Tote. El Paso was home to El Paso Corporation formerly known as El Paso Natural Gas Company.

The city also has a large military presence with Fort Bliss, William Beaumont Army Medical Center, and Biggs Army Airfield. The defense industry in El Paso employs over 41,000 and provides a $6 billion annual impact to the city's economy. In 2013, Fort Bliss was chosen as the newly configured U.S. Air Force Security Forces Regional Training Center which added 8,000 to 10,000 Air Force personnel annually.

In addition to the military, the federal government has a strong presence in El Paso to manage its status and unique issues as an important border region. Operations headquartered in El Paso include the DEA Domestic Field Division 7, El Paso Intelligence Center, Joint Task Force North, U.S. Border Patrol El Paso Sector, and U.S. Border Patrol Special Operations Group.

Call-center operations employ more than 10,000 people in the area. Automatic Data Processing has an office in West El Paso, employing about 1,100 people with expansion plans to reach 2,200 by 2020.

Tourism is another major industry in El Paso, bringing in $1.5 billion and over 2.3 million visitors annually due to the city's sunny weather, natural beauty, rich cultural history, and many outdoor attractions.

Education is also a driving force in El Paso's economy. El Paso's three large school districts are among the largest employers in the area, employing more than 20,000 people among them. UTEP has an annual budget of nearly $418 million and employs nearly 4,800 people. A 2010 study by the university's Institute for Policy and Economic Development stated the university's impact on local businesses is $417 million annually.

== Arts and culture ==
The culture of El Paso, Texas is influenced heavily by the mixing of American and Mexican cultures, due to the city's position on the U.S. Mexico border, its large Chicano population, and its history as part of Hispanic America and Mexico.

=== Annual cultural events and festivals ===
The Amigo Airsho is one of El Paso's premier events, and is ranked as one of the top-10 air shows in the country, filled with air entertainment and ground activities. Acts include the Franklin's Flying Circus, where performers walk on the wings of an airborne plane. Ground activities include a jet-powered school bus. After 31 years of being held at Biggs Army Airfield, the show was moved to Dona Ana Airport in 2014.

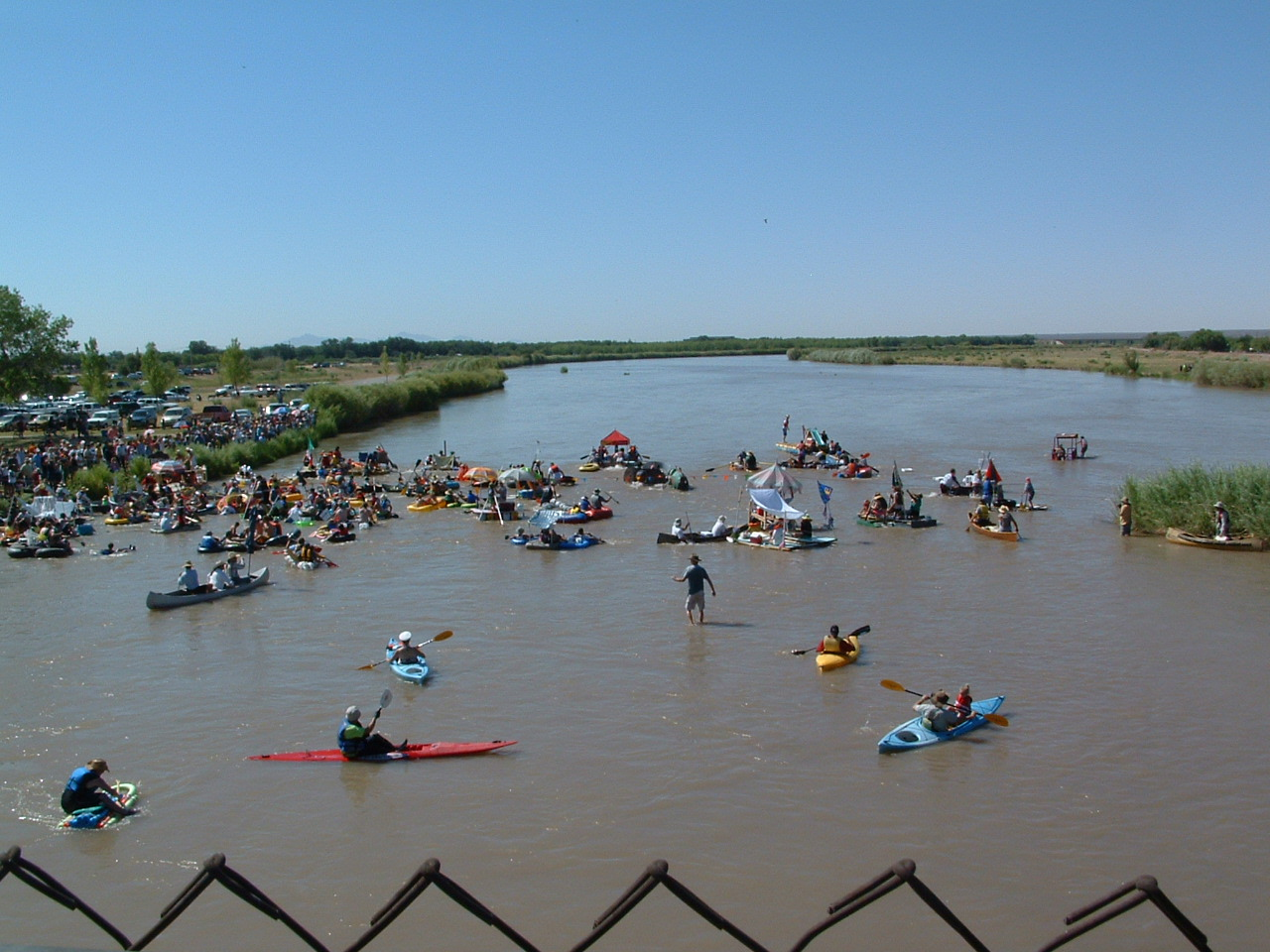
Great River Raft Race held annually on the Rio Grande in El Paso's upper valley

The KLAQ Great River Raft Race is an annual event celebrated on the second to last Saturday of June. Participants are encouraged to ride the river and float the Rio Grande with family and friends. The organizers encourage the building of unique rafts that get down the river, with prizes and trophies awarded for the most points earned, best-looking crew, and best-decorated raft. The race starts at the Vinton Bridge and ends 3 miles downstream at the Canutillo Bridge.

The Southwestern International PRCA Rodeo is the 17th-oldest rodeo in the nation and El Paso's longest-running sporting event. Consistently ranked as one of the top 50 shows in the country by the Professional Rodeo Cowboys Association, this charitable event is a celebration of western culture and heritage.

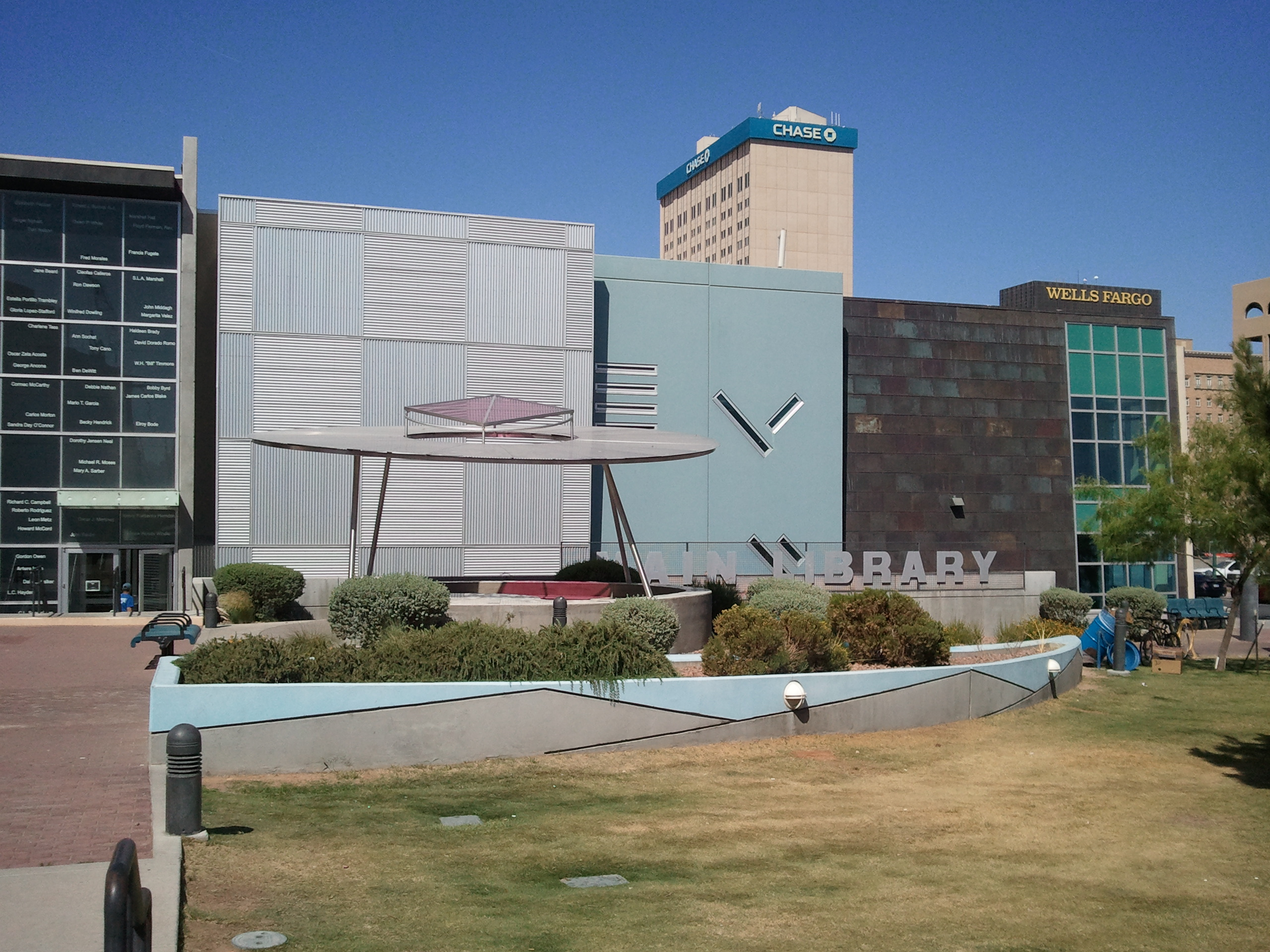
Cleveland Square in downtown El Paso is where many of the festivals are held annually.

La Fiesta de las Flores is one of the oldest Hispanic festivals in the Southwest. The three-day fiesta is held each year during the Labor Day weekend and emphasizes El Paso's Hispanic heritage and culture. The festival attracts 20,000 to 30,000 visitors from El Paso County, New Mexico, West Texas, and the State of Chihuahua, Mexico. Activities included in the fiesta are crowning of the queen, a Fiesta Parade, Senior Appreciation Dance, Military Appreciation Day, and live entertainment. The fiesta is also well known for the authentic regional cuisine, arts and crafts, games, and services available for the enjoyment of all attendees. Over 80 booths, sponsored by local vendors and nonprofit organizations, create the Hispanic ambience and culture.

The El Paso Balloonfest is an annual event celebrated on Memorial Day weekend and is self described as "3 days of hot air balloons filling the El Paso skies, 3 afternoons of concerts and fun in the sun at Wet N' Wild Waterworld in Anthony, Texas". Over 60 balloons take to the air from TFCU launch field, which is adjacent to the water park. After the balloons launch, visitors have a weekend of water rides, swimming, concerts, and grilling. The concert aspect of the event features local bands, starting at noon, and different headlining artists in the afternoon. Overnight camping has been added for 2014.

The El Paso Sun City Pride is the largest annual LGBT event in the region, attracting thousands every June. The event was established in 2007.

=== Music festivals ===
The annual El Paso Downtown Street Festival is held during the last weekend of June in downtown El Paso near the El Paso Convention Center. It is the oldest musical festival in the city and brings local, regional, and nationally known acts.

The annual Neon Desert Music Festival is a two-day event usually held on the last Saturday and Sunday of May on five stages in downtown El Paso, stretching from San Jacinto Plaza to Cleveland Square. The festival brings over 30 acts from the worlds of indie rock, Latin, and electronic dance music.

The outdoor concert series, started in 1983, is held annually at the Chamizal National Memorial and draws over 60,000 attendees. It features local and international performers with wide-ranging musical genres: Classical, Country, Tejano, rock and others. The evening concerts are showcased every Sunday afternoon and start in early June and end in the middle of August.

The only El Paso musical festival not held downtown, instead it is held at Ascarate Park. The Sun City Music Festival is a two-day event dubbed as the largest electronic dance music festival in Texas.

The Texas Showdown Festival is an annual event celebrating musicians and tattoo artists under one roof. Dubbed as the world's largest tattoo and musical festival, the event is held usually the last weekend of July at the El Paso County Coliseum.

=== Performing arts ===
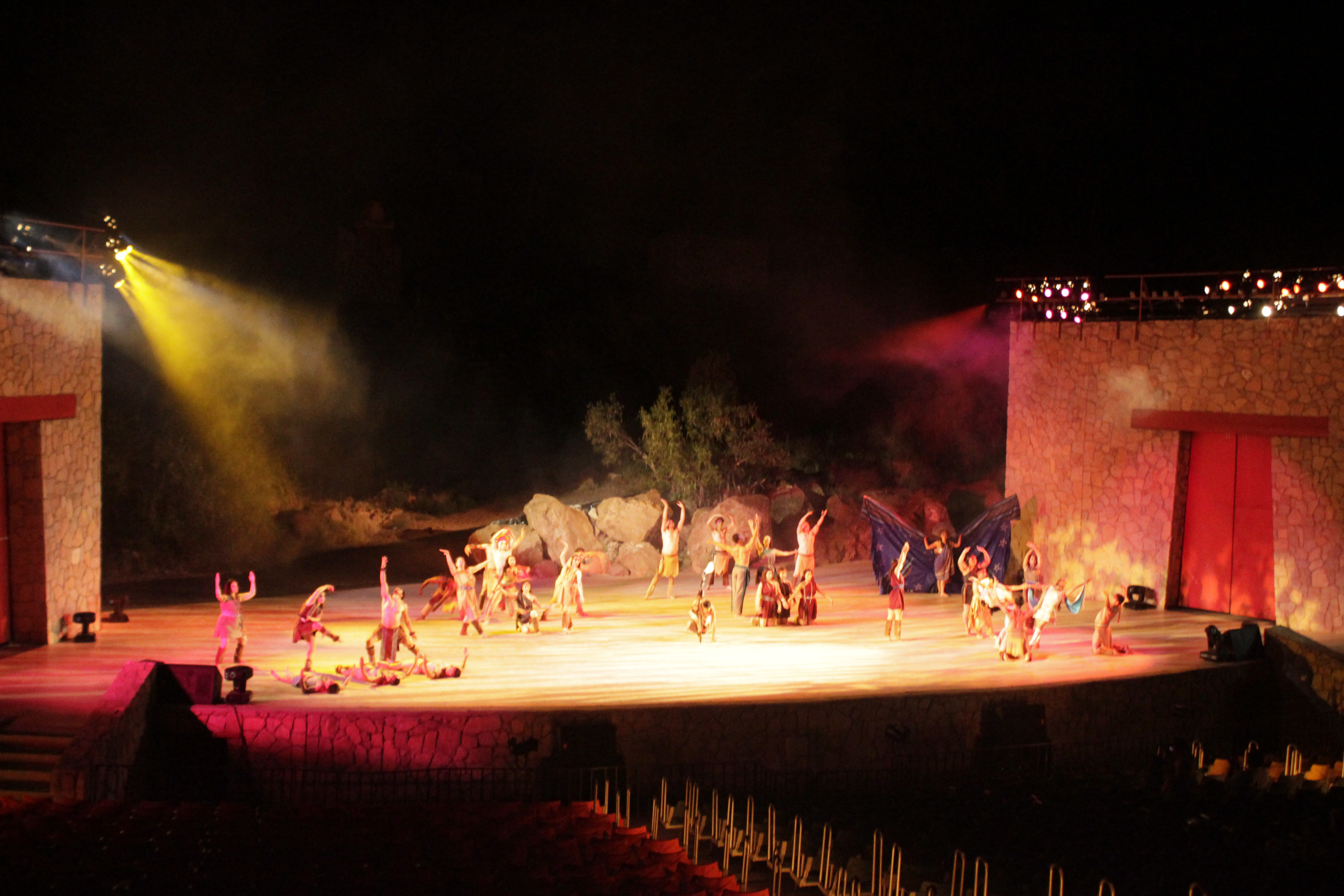
Viva! El Paso performance at the McKelligon Canyon Amphitheatre

The outdoor musical extravaganza Viva! El Paso is performed in the McKelligon Canyon Amphitheatre. It is locally produced and chronicles the 400-year history and cultural evolution of the El Paso region. The show is performed each Friday and Saturday night in June, July, and August. It has entertained local residents and out-of-town visitors for over 35 years.

The El Paso Symphony was established in the 1930s, and is the oldest performing-arts organization in El Paso and the longest continuously running symphony orchestra in Texas. It has received both national and international recognition as a result of its very successful tours of Germany in 1996 and Turkey in 2000, and continues to represent the El Paso region with pride and distinction. The El Paso Symphony Orchestra Association season is anchored by 12 classical concerts. Special events serve as outreach toward new audiences.

Ballet was largely nonexistent in El Paso until the arrival of Ingeborg Heuser, a professional ballerina from Germany, in the 1950s. Heuser taught ballet at UTEP for 47 years and founded the city's first professional ballet company, firstly known as Texas Western Civic Ballet and eventually as Ballet El Paso. The company dissipated due to financial trouble in 1997 and Heuser retired from UTEP soon after. The El Paso Youth Ballet was founded in 2009 by Heuser's student, Marta Katz, following Heuser's departure from the university. With students from the youth ballet, Heuser staged her last Nutcracker in 2006. The youth company continues to perform the Nutcracker and other preprofessional pieces in and around the El Paso area. The company provides the only platform for young ballet dancers to train and perform at such a level within the city since the folding of Ballet El Paso.

El Paso City Ballet is a current professional ballet company in El Paso, providing local employment for professional dancers in the field of ballet. The company performs a variety of classical and contemporary works choreographed by Artistic Director Lisa Skaf and artists from the US and Latin America. It has been active since 2005, performing yearly productions.

=== Theaters ===
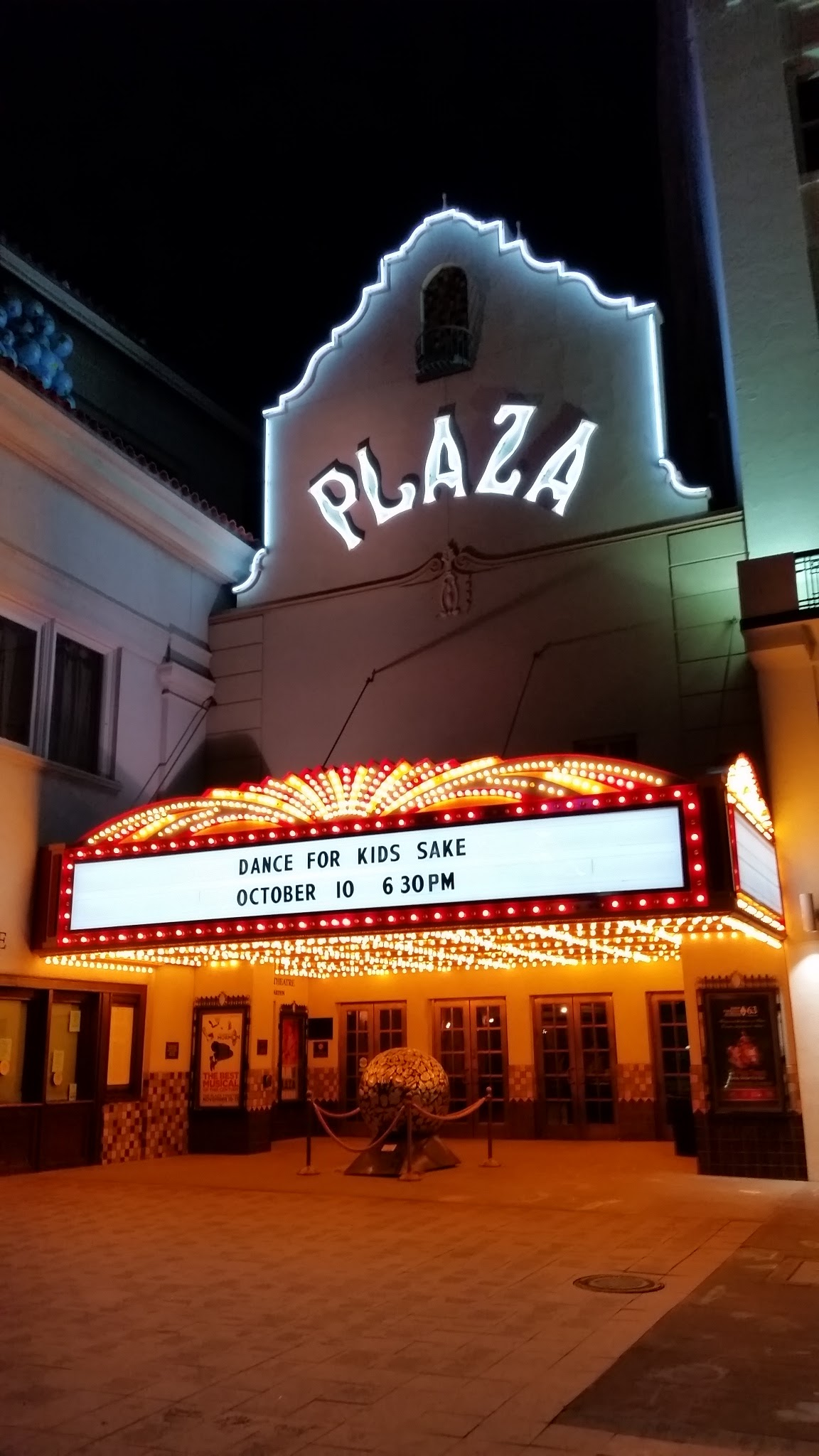
Plaza Theater at night

The Plaza Theatre is a National Historic Building of Significance built in 1930. It features the 2,050-seat Kendall Kidd Performance Hall, and the smaller 200-seat Philanthropy Theatre. It hosts Broadway productions, musical concerts, individual performers, and the annual Plaza Classic Film Festival.

The Abraham Chavez Theatre is a 2,500-seat concert hall adjacent to the Williams Convention Center. Its exterior resembles a sombrero and features a three-story glass main entrance. The theatre is named after Maestro Abraham Chavez, who was the longtime conductor of the El Paso Symphony. Inside, the theatre has a 5,000-square-foot (460 m^{2}) lobby and a 40-by-56-ft stage, as well as 14 dressing rooms. The theater's seating is in three levels. Also, a meeting room is adjacent to the theater.

Events held at Chavez Theatre include concerts, Broadway shows, graduation ceremonies, performances of the El Paso Symphony Orchestra, and other special events.

McKelligon Canyon is a 90-acre (360,000 m^{2}) park, located in the Franklin Mountains, open to hikers and picnickers. In the canyon, McKelligon Canyon Amphitheatre is surrounded on three sides by canyon walls; the 1,500-seat amphitheater is used for concerts and special events, such as Viva! El Paso.

The El Paso Playhouse, a community theatre, provides entertainment and educational experiences to a diverse multicultural population through the high-quality production of plays and theatrical events. The playhouse provides a venue for artists, technicians, patrons, and community members to participate in the arts through regularly scheduled season productions and holiday performances. The theater is affiliated with Kids-N-Co, a theater for child actors to children's performances .

The University of Texas, El Paso Dinner Theatre located inside the University of Texas, El Paso campus, and was founded in 1983 and is entirely produced, designed and directed by students. The theatre presents 4 fully staged musicals each season and a fully staged student produced musical.

=== Area museums ===
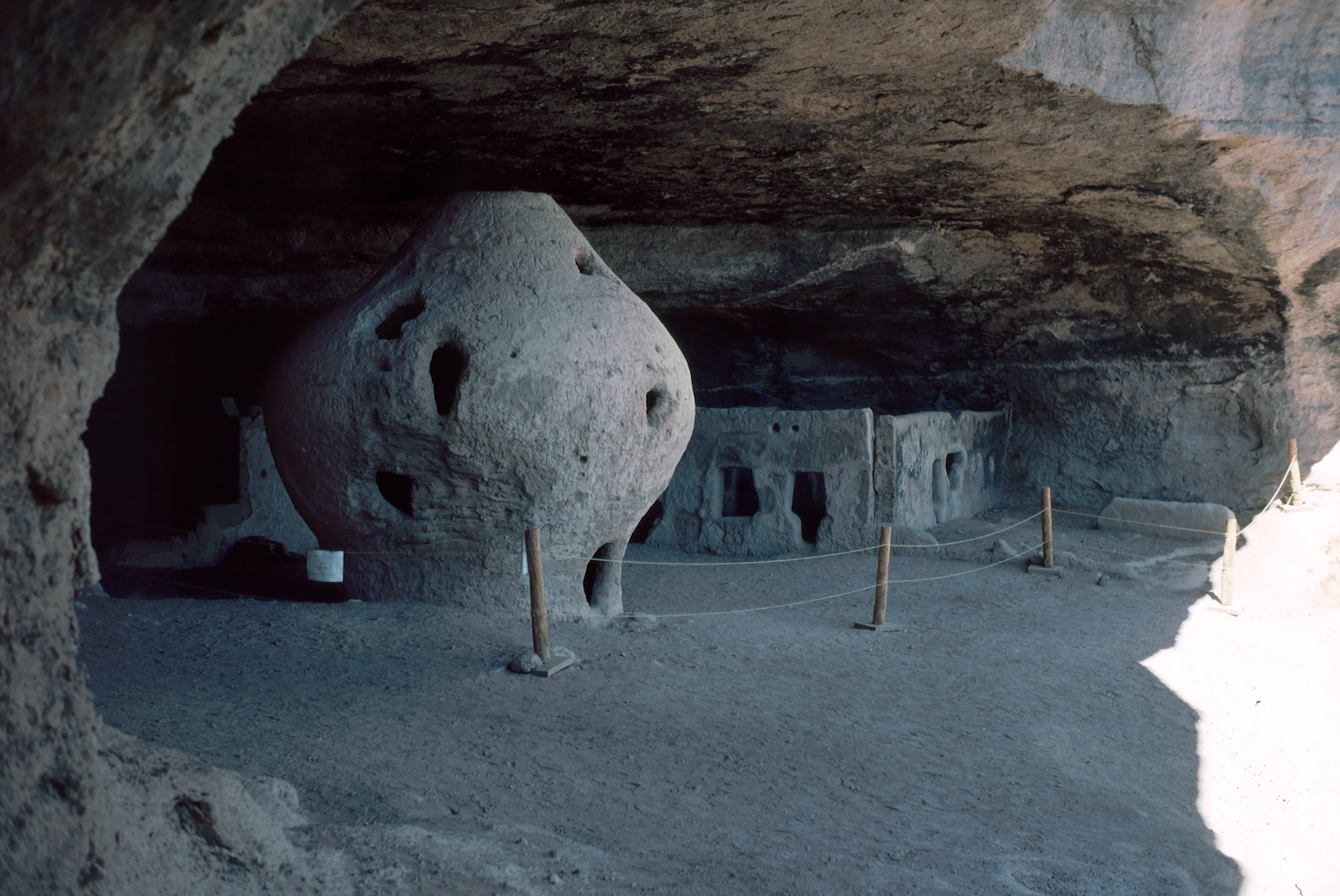
El Paso Museum of Archaeology, diorama shows Cueva de la Olla (cave of the pot – a large pot-shaped storage container for grain), Paquimé, Sierra Madre of Chihuahua

The Centennial Museum and Chihuahuan Desert Gardens, located on the grounds of UTEP, includes a comprehensive collection of El Paso Brown, Native American pottery, as well as educational exhibits for students.

The El Paso Museum of Archaeology is located on the eastern slope of North Franklin Mountain, west of Gateway South Blvd. on TransMountain Rd. Its grounds include native plants of the American Southwest, as well samples of Native American shelters, in an unspoiled location. The museum includes dioramas for school children that illustrate the culture and geology of the American Southwest, such as Hueco Tanks in El Paso County. One diorama (see image to the right) is of the Cueva de la Olla (cave of the pot) which is located in the Sierra Madre of Chihuahua, an example of the Paquimé culture.

The El Paso Museum of Art is located next to the Plaza Theater adjacent to San Jacinto Plaza, the public square downtown. It contains works of Southwestern artists such as Tom Lea.

Other area museums include:

- El Paso Holocaust Museum and Study Center
- International Museum of Art El Paso
- El Paso Museum of History
- Fort Bliss Museums and Study Center
- Insights El Paso Science Museum
- The Magoffin Homestead, dating from 1875, is now a state historic site.
- The National Border Patrol Museum is located adjacent to the El Paso Museum of Archaeology.
- Railroad and Transportation Museum of El Paso
- The Gene Roddenberry Planetarium
- Lynx Exhibits

=== Sites within the city limits ===
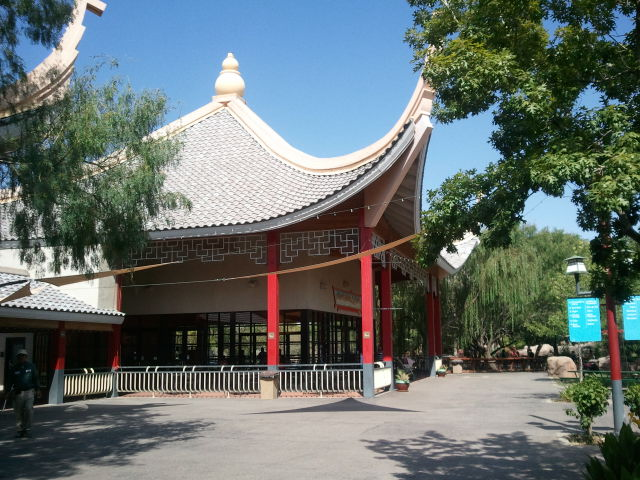
Asia exhibit entrance at the El Paso Zoo

- Ysleta Mission is recognized as the oldest continuously operated parish in the State of Texas.
- Cathedral of Saint Patrick erected in 1916 is the seat of the Roman Catholic Diocese of El Paso.
- Chamizal National Memorial
- El Paso Zoo – a 35-acre (14 ha) facility housing 220 species.
- Magoffin Home State Historic Site
- Plaza Hotel
- Union Depot
- El Paso High School
- University of Texas at El Paso The university's distinctive style is a type of fortress architecture, Dzong, found in the present and former Buddhist mountain kingdoms of the Himalayas, Bhutan and Tibet.

== Sports ==
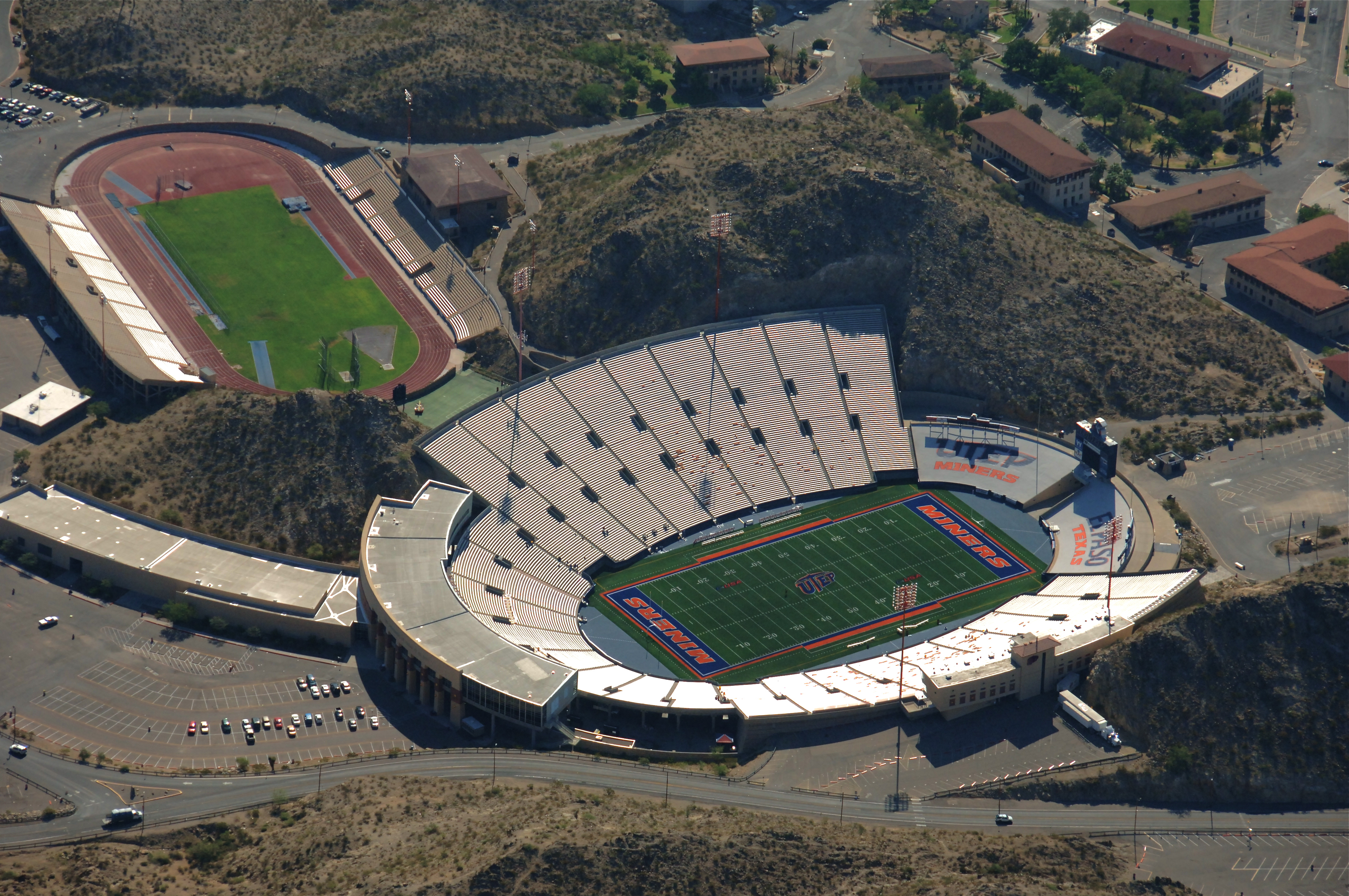
Aerial view of Sun Bowl Stadium and Kidd Field

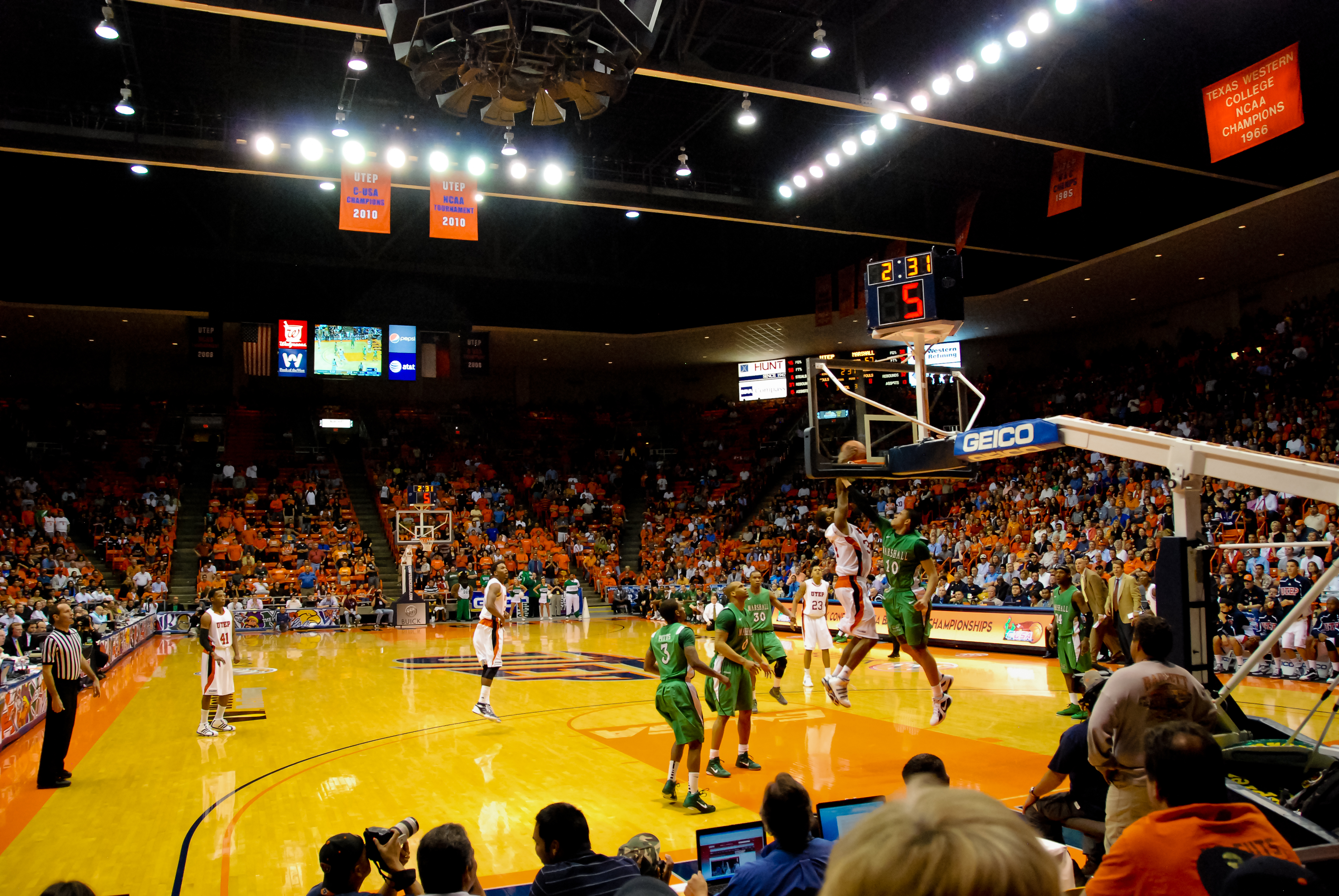
Don Haskins Center at the UTEP campus

El Paso is home to the Sun Bowl, the second-oldest consecutive college football contest (after the Rose Bowl). Its first game was held in 1935.

On September 18, 2012, the city council voted to approve the demolition of its city hall to make way for Southwest University Park, the new home of the El Paso Chihuahuas Triple-A team (San Diego Padres affiliate); it opened in 2014. The team was purchased by Mountainstar Sports Group of El Paso. City Hall was demolished on April 14, 2013.

The El Paso Marathon takes place annually since 2007. The El Paso Locomotive FC soccer team began playing in 2019 in the USL Championship. They play their home matches at the Southwest University Park.

Club	Sport	League	Venue	Capacity
El Paso Chihuahuas	Baseball	PCL	Southwest University Park	9,500
El Paso Locomotive FC	Soccer	USLC	Southwest University Park	9,500
El Paso Rhinos	Ice hockey	NAHL	Sierra Providence Event Center	5,250
UTEP Miners Football	NCAA Division I FBS Football	C-USA	Sun Bowl Stadium	51,500
UTEP Basketball Men	NCAA Division I Basketball	C-USA	Don Haskins Center	12,000
UTEP Basketball Women	NCAA Division I Basketball	C-USA	Don Haskins Center	12,000
UTEP Softball	NCAA Division I Softball	C-USA	Helen of Troy Field	607
UTEP Track and Field	NCAA Division I Track and Field	C-USA	Kidd Field	15,000
UTEP Women's Soccer	NCAA Division I Soccer	C-USA	University Field	500
EPCC Baseball	NJCAA Division I Baseball	WJCAC	EPCC Baseball Field	520

== Parks and recreation ==
El Paso is home to the largest urban park in the nation. The Franklin Mountains State Park, with its more than 24,248 acres (9,813 ha), is completely located within the city limits. It is considered a small range (23 miles long, 3 miles (4.8 km) wide) that extends from the city north into New Mexico. It is home to the highest peak in the county North Franklin Mountain at 7,192 feet.The park is open year-round for recreation including hiking, mountain biking, picnicking, scenic driving and views of the city. Scenic Drive runs along the mountain range, and is designated as a city park to allow better vandalism control and cleanup, Roads are closed to vehicles on certain Sundays to allow walking, running, cycling, and skating. The road offers views of El Paso, as well as nearby Ciudad Juárez, across the Mexico–United States border.

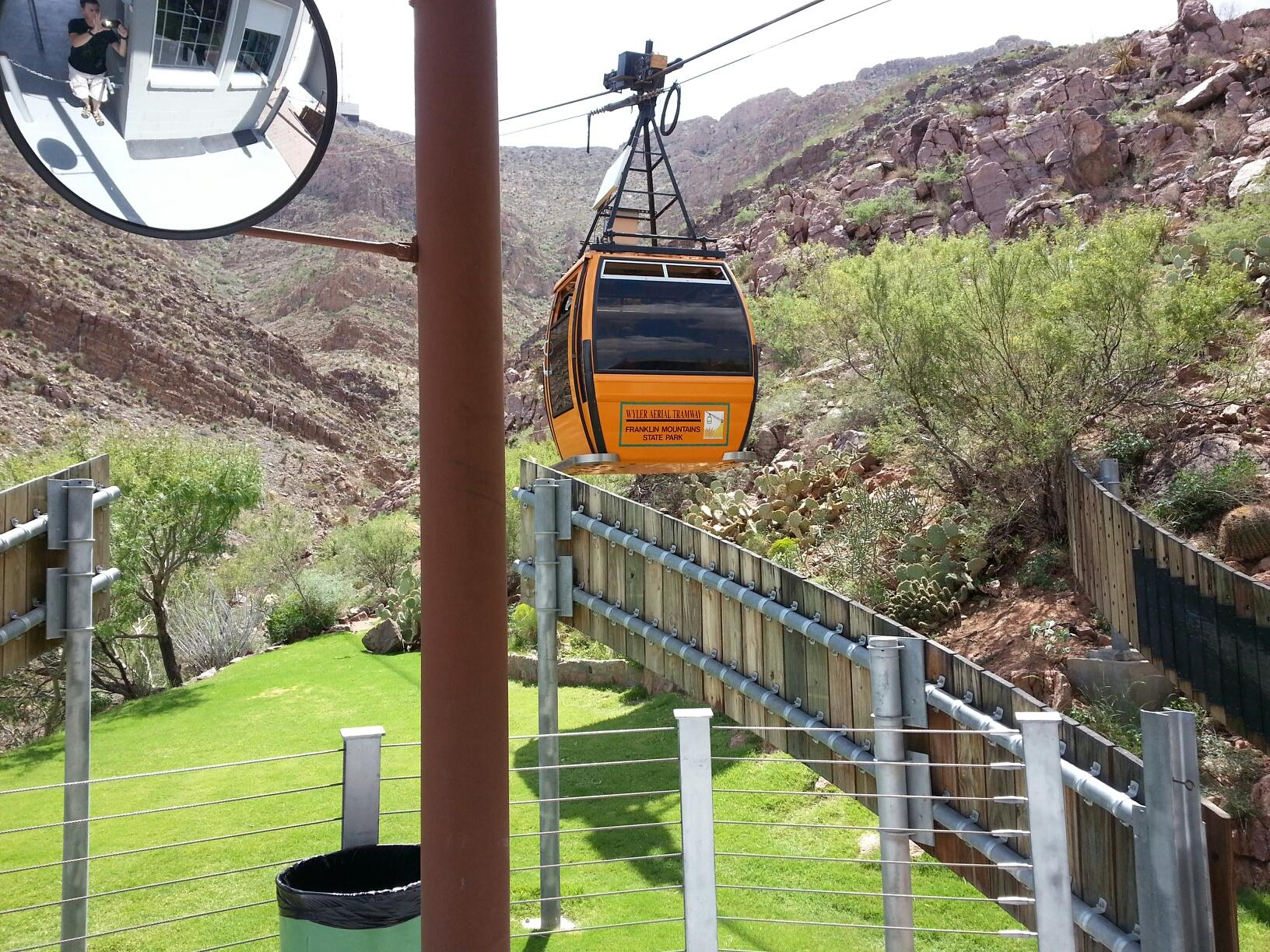
The Wyler Aerial Tramway in the Franklin Mountains is the only commercial tramway in the state of Texas.

The Wyler Aerial Tramway is operated by the Texas Parks and Wildlife Department and is in the Franklin Mountains State Park. The tramway complex covers 196 acres (0.79 km^{2}) on the east side of the Franklin Mountains. The gondolas travel along two 2,600-foot (790 m) 1 3/8-diameter steel cables to Ranger Peak, 5,632 feet (1,717 m) above sea level. The trip takes about four minutes and lifts riders 940 feet (290 m) above the boarding area.The tramway was built in 1959 by KTSM radio to aid in the construction of a transmitter tower. Karl O. Wyler managed the project. First opening to the public as the El Paso Aerial Tramway, the facility provided rides from 1960 to 1986, when high liability insurance costs forced the tram to stop public operations. The tram was only used to service the transmitter towers. Wyler donated the tramway for public use in his will. The Texas Parks and Wildlife Department accepted the donation in 1997 and renovated and re-opened the tramway to the public in 2001. The tramway was closed indefinitely on September 18, 2020.

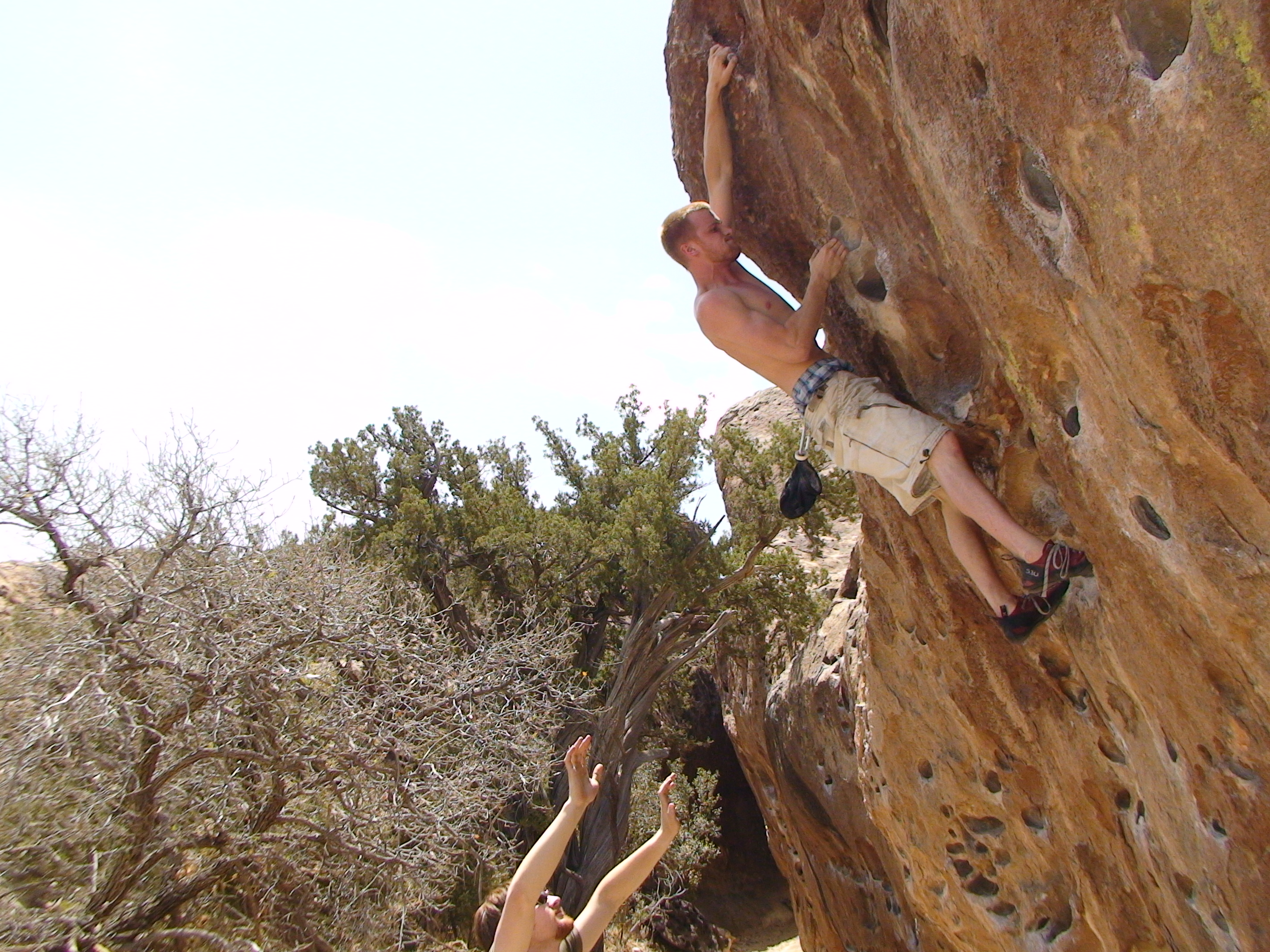
Bouldering on North Mountain at Hueco Tanks

Hueco Tanks State Historic Site is a Texas historic site in the Hueco Tanks area, approximately 32 miles (51 km) northeast of downtown El Paso and just west of the Hueco Mountains. The park is popular for recreation such as birdwatching and bouldering, and is culturally and spiritually significant to many Native Americans. This significance is partially manifested in the pictographs (rock paintings) that can be found throughout the region, many of which are thousands of years old. Hueco Tanks is also widely regarded as one of the best areas in the world for bouldering (rock climbing, low enough to attempt without ropes for protection), unique for its rock type, the concentration and quality of the climbing, and after which the Hueco bouldering grades are named. In any given climbing season, which generally lasts from October through March, it is common for climbers from across Europe, Asia, and Australia to visit the park. Since implementation of the Public Use Plan, following a brief closure of the entire park due to the park service's inability to manage the growing crowds of international climbers, volunteer or commercial guides are required to access more than 2/3 of the park's area. Only North Mountain is accessible without guides, and then only for about 70 people at any given time. The park offers camping and showers for a small fee a day or, as is most popular for climbers, the nearby Hueco Rock Ranch offers camping where climbers can relax and socialize.

Located in downtown El Paso, San Jacinto Plaza is a historical park notable for its alligator statues in the middle of the area. Known as "Alligator Plaza", it used to have a pond that held live alligators that the community can interact with starting in 1962. They were removed and relocated to the El Paso Zoo in 1974. The area around the park is typically used to hold major events such as "Chalk the Block Arts Festival" and "Winterfest".

The Chamizal National Memorial is a 54.90-acre (22.22 ha) memorial park that serves primarily as a cultural center and contains art galleries, a theater, and an amphitheatre. A museum detailing the history of the Mexico–U.S. border is located inside the visitor center.

The city is also home to 242 municipal parks.

=== Botanical gardens ===
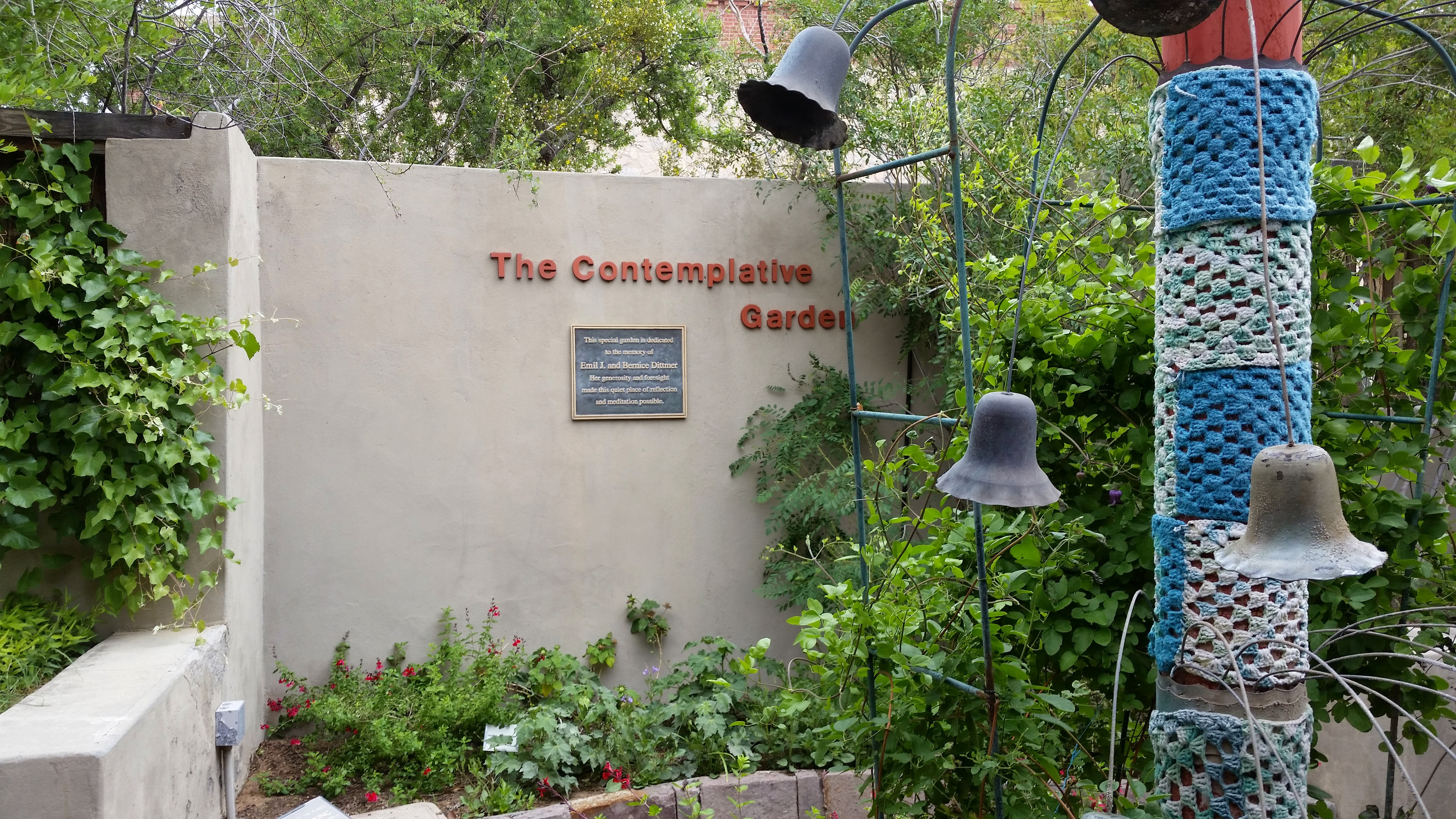
The Contemplative Garden at the Chihuahuan Desert Gardens

- The Chihuahuan Desert Gardens (CDG) display the flora of the Chihuahuan Desert and adjacent regions in the United States and Mexico. The Gardens were formally dedicated in September 1999 and contain over 625 different species of plants, comprising one of the largest captive assemblages of Chihuahuan Desert flora in the world.
- The El Paso Municipal Rose Garden (officially named the All-American Rose Selection (AARS) public garden) is one of over 100 certified gardens within the United States. There are over 1,900 rosebushes with 500 varieties. The wrought-iron fenced garden has wide walkways with handicap accessibility, raised beds, a waterfall, and trees and shrubs. Several new rose varieties are planted each year, and after two years the highest-rated are named and receive the AARS symbol.
- Feather Lake is a 43.5-acre (17.6 ha) wildlife sanctuary based on a 40-acre (16 ha) wetland built by the City of El Paso in 1969 as a stormwater-retention basin. Since 1976, the El Paso/Trans-Pecos Audubon Society has leased this land from the city and managed it for wildlife. Over 200 different species of birds, especially those associated with water, have been observed at the sanctuary. Fauna residing there include muskrats, spiny softshell turtles, pond sliders, and Trans-Pecos striped whiptail lizards.
- Keystone Heritage Park comprises an Archaic-period archaeological site, wetlands, and a desert botanical garden. The 4,500-year-old site is one of the oldest villages in the United States. The wetlands are home to many birds, and over 200 species have been spotted there on their seasonal migrations. The botanical garden features a variety of native plants, and includes a pavilion and a replica of an Archaic period brush hut. The newest component, The Chihuahuan Desert Experience, is a work in progress that will allow visitors to stroll the 900-mile (1,400 km) length of desert over a 17-acre (6.9 ha) recreation of the plant indigenous life.
- Rio Bosque Wetlands is a 372-acre (151 ha) city park, managed by the Center for Environmental Resource Management of the University of Texas at El Paso, which began restoration efforts in 1998. In the fall and winter, water flows through the park along the route of the river before it was confined within levees in the 1930s. Many animals and birds have returned to the area as the restoration proceeds, and over 200 species of birds have been sighted.

=== Golf courses ===
The metro area has 16 golf courses including Butterfield Trail Golf Club, the only public premium daily fee Tom Fazio designed golf course in the state of Texas. It was ranked No. 1 in Texas and No. 3 in the Nation on Golfweek's 2013 Best Municipal Golf Courses. Other golf courses found in the county include:

- Ascarate Golf Course
- Coronado Country Club
- El Paso Country Club
- Horizon City Golf Course
- Lone Star Golf Club
- Painted Dunes Desert Golf Club
- Underwood Golf Complex

== Government ==
=== City ===
The city government is officially nonpartisan. Mayors and city council members are elected for four year terms and may not serve more than two full terms or for more than ten years total in their respective offices. Municipal elections were held in May in odd-numbered years until a voter-approved charter amendment changed this to November in even-numbered years, beginning in 2018.

The city operates under a council–manager form of government. Power is concentrated in the eight-member elected city council and mayor, who hire a manager to carry out its directives and oversee the delivery of public services. The current city manager is Dionne Mack, and the current mayor of El Paso is Renard Johnson, who was elected to the office in 2024.

=== County ===
The El Paso County Judge is Ricardo Samaniego, and the County Commissioners are Jackie Arroyo Butler (Precinct 1), David Stout (Precinct 2), Iliana Holguin (Precinct 3), and Sergio Coronado (Precinct 4). The commissioners and the county judge are Democrats.

Stout was first elected to his position in 2014, was re-elected in 2018 and 2022, and defeated in the 2026 Democratic primary. Samaniego was first elected in 2018, and was re-elected unopposed in 2022. Holguin was first elected to her position in 2020 and re-elected unopposed in 2024. Coronado was first elected to his position in 2022, and defeated in the 2026 Democratic primary. Arroyo Butler was first elected to her position in 2024.

=== State ===
The El Paso metropolitan area is represented in the Texas State House by Democrats Eddie Morales, Mary Gonzalez, Joe Moody, Claudia Ordaz, and Vincent Perez, and in the State Senate by Cesar Blanco (D-El Paso).

The Texas Department of Criminal Justice operates both the El Paso I District Parole Office in the city, as well as the Rogelio Sanchez State Jail . The El Paso II District Parole Office is in an unincorporated area east of Horizon City.

=== Federal ===
El Paso City and County vote overwhelmingly Democratic, like most of the Texas–Mexico border area and urban Texas. At the 2024 presidential election, El Paso County shifted 20.4 points toward the Republican Party from the last election, while the City saw a smaller but still significant 18.3 point swing.

In the United States House of Representatives, most of El Paso is part of Texas's 16th congressional district represented by Democrat Veronica Escobar. A small sliver in the eastern part of the city is part of Texas's 23rd congressional district, represented by Democrat Katy Padilla Stout. The current U.S. senators for Texas are Ted Cruz (R-Texas) and James Talarico (D-Texas).

== Education ==
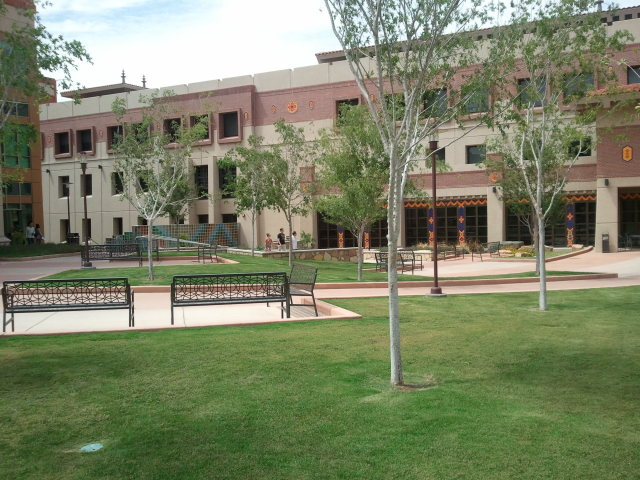
UTEP's College of Engineering building

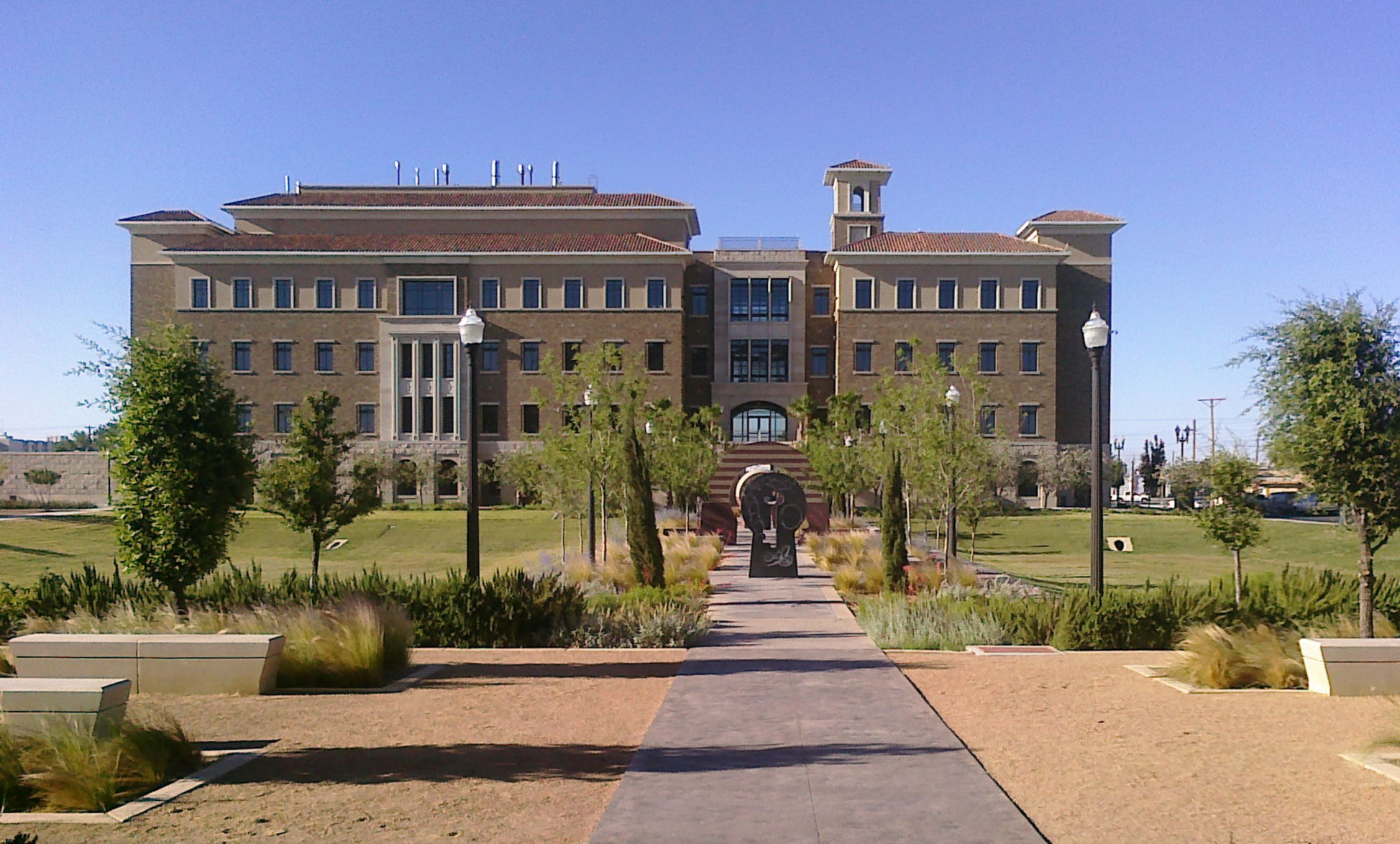
Paul L. Foster School of Medicine within Texas Tech University HSC at El Paso's campus

El Paso is home to the University of Texas at El Paso, a Tier 1 doctoral research university and the largest public university in the region. UTEP was ranked as the 7th best university in Washington Monthly's 2013 National University Rankings, just behind Stanford and ahead of Harvard. Also, the university's School of Engineering is the nation's top producer of Hispanic engineers with M.S. and Ph.D. degrees.

El Paso is also home to Texas Tech University Health Sciences Center at El Paso, Paul L. Foster School of Medicine, Texas Tech College of Architecture at El Paso, Park University and Southwest University. Also due to its proximity, many El Paso students attend New Mexico State University where the school offers in-state tuition to El Paso County residents.

The El Paso Community College's boundary includes all of El Paso County. There are several technical schools and for profit schools. El Pasoans also have access to the Doña Ana Community College with campuses in Sunland Park, Anthony and Chaparral, New Mexico: This community college is a part of the New Mexico State University system.

El Paso area students attend public schools in four school districts that cover portions of the city limits: El Paso Independent School District, Ysleta Independent School District, Socorro Independent School District and Canutillo Independent School District; there are nine independent school districts in the county. Numerous accredited private preparatory schools also serve El Paso students. These include various pre-high school religious (Christian, Jewish) affiliates and Montessori schools, Cathedral High School, Loretto Academy, Father Yermo High School, Lydia Patterson Institute, Faith Christian Academy, El Paso Jewish Academy, Rose of Sharon Christian Academy, Zion Lutheran Day School and Radford School. The University of El Paso offers the country's only bilingual M.F.A. creative writing program.

El Paso is home to bi-national economic development groups; the Hub of Human Innovation and Technology Hub. The industry groups' tertiary vocational programs, give workforce training in automation, robotics and AI technology.

=== Public libraries ===
The El Paso Public Library serves the needs of the public in El Paso. It consists of 12 branches, a bookmobile, a mobile computer classroom and a mobile outreach unit (Kidsmobile). It also has multiple outreach services available.

== Media ==
=== Newspapers ===
The main newspapers are the English-language daily El Paso Times, founded in 1881; the Spanish-language daily El Diario de El Paso, and the online newspaper El Paso Herald-Post started in 2015. The original and defunct El Paso Herald Post was also founded in 1881 as the El Paso Herald, which then merged with the El Paso Post in 1931. The paper was shut down in 1997. El Paso Matters, a non-profit online newspaper, was founded in 2019.

Weekly and niche magazines:

- El Paso Inc
- El Paso Scene
- La Polaka
- Jrznoticias
- The City Magazine
- The Prospector, published by the University of Texas at El Paso
- Tejano Tribune, published by El Paso Community College

=== Radio stations ===
Radio stations from Las Cruces, New Mexico, and Ciudad Juárez, Chihuahua, can also be heard within the El Paso market.

=== Television ===
El Paso was the largest city in the United States without a PBS television station within the city limits until 1978, when KCOS-TV was founded. El Paso viewers had to watch channel 22, KRWG, from Las Cruces until 1978. In fact, the city had only three English-speaking channels and two Spanish-language channels (channel 2 and channel 5) from Juarez, and cable TV subscribers in the 1970s and 1980s could receive four Los Angeles independent channels: KTLA, KHJ, KTTV and KCOP as well as Spanish-language stations KMEX of Los Angeles and KWEX of San Antonio usually sharing the same cable channel slot. Over time, as more television stations signed on, more cable channels were added and those stations added network affiliations, the Los Angeles and San Antonio stations disappeared from the lineup. The last to be removed was KTLA in the fall of 2006 as a consequence of the WB-UPN merger into The CW, when KVIA-TV launched a digital subchannel with the network's programming.

In 2019, KCOS was absorbed and moved to Lubbock as part of Texas Tech Public Media in order to keep the station on air after years of financial struggles. KCOS still focuses on broadcasting to the El Paso community.

== Infrastructure ==
=== Healthcare ===
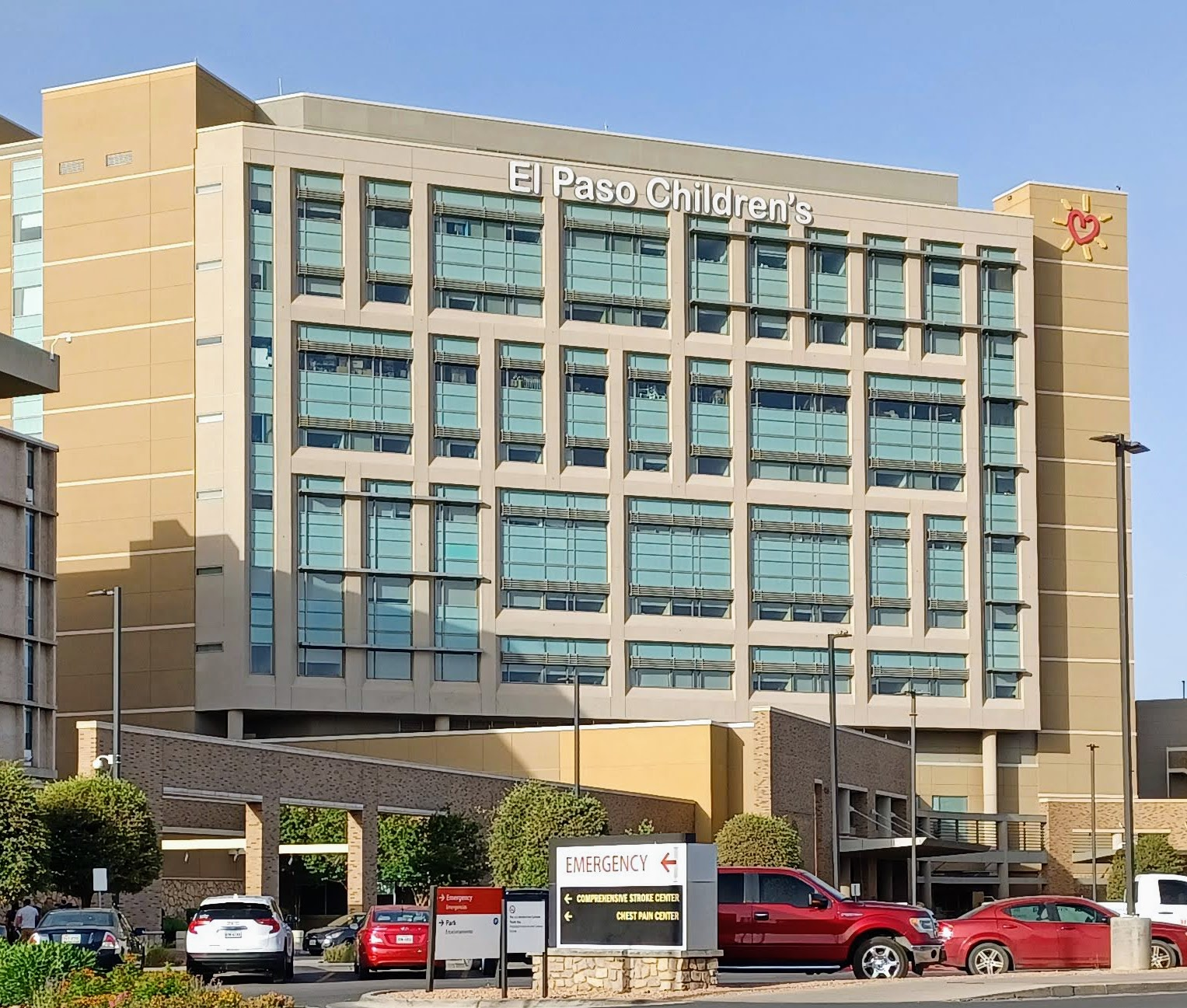
El Paso Children's Hospital at the Medical Center of the Americas

El Paso is the medical hub of West Texas and Southern New Mexico, hosting numerous state-of-the-art medical centers. Some of the city's top hospitals include University Medical Center, William Beaumont Army Medical Center, Sierra Medical Center, Las Palmas Medical Center, Del Sol Medical Center, Sierra Providence East Medical Center, El Paso Children's Hospital, and Providence Memorial Hospital. University Medical Center is the only level I trauma center in the region. William Beaumont Army Medical Center will be replaced by a new state of the art $1.2 billion Fort Bliss Replacement Hospital expected to open in 2020. El Paso's newest hospital, The Hospitals of Providence Transmountain Campus opened in Northwest El Paso on January 27, 2017. The 106-bed teaching hospital is a collaboration between Texas Tech University Health Sciences Center El Paso and The Hospitals of Providence. The hospitals were strained during the COVID-19 pandemic in Texas, and 10 refrigerated morgue trailers were installed to handle increased mortality.

El Paso is also home to the Medical Center of the Americas, an integrated complex of medical facilities anchored by Texas Tech University Health Sciences Center at El Paso, Paul L. Foster School of Medicine, University Medical Center, the El Paso Psychiatric Center and by the El Paso Children's Hospital. It is also the site to the Cardwell Collaborative biomedical research building, the Gayle Greve Hunt School of Nursing, and the Graduate School of Biomedical Sciences. The Woody L. Hunt School of Dental Medicine is expected to open in 2021 in the MCA area as well.

=== Transportation ===
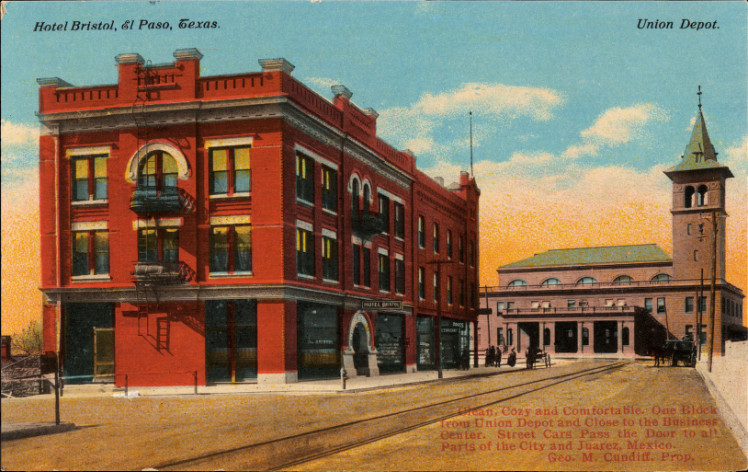
Hotel Bristol and the Union Depot at El Paso, Texas (postcard, c. 1912)

El Paso is served by El Paso International Airport and Amtrak via the historic Union Depot.

Several roads and highways connect El Paso, including I-10, US 54 (known locally as "54", the "North-South Freeway" or officially as the Patriot Freeway), Spur 601 (Liberty Expressway), US 180 and US 62 (Montana Avenue), US Highway 85 (Paisano Drive), Loop 375, Loop 478 (Copia Street-Pershing Drive-Dyer Street), numerous Texas Farm-to-Market roads (a class of state highway commonly abbreviated to FM) and the city's original thoroughfare, SH 20, the eastern portion of which is known locally as Alameda Avenue (formerly US 80). SH 20 also includes portions of Texas Avenue in Central El Paso, Mesa Street from Downtown to the West Side, and Doniphan Drive on the West Side. Northeast El Paso is connected to West El Paso by Transmountain Road (Loop 375). The city also shares four international bridges and one railbridge with Ciudad Juárez, Mexico. In 2009, El Paso was home to number 52, number 98, and number 100 of the 100 most congested roads in Texas, which are, respectively: North Zaragoza Road between Sun Fire Boulevard and I-10; Lee Trevino Drive between Montana Avenue and I-10; and I-10 between the Patriot Freeway and Loop 375.

In 2009, 79.8% of El Paso (city) commuters drive to work alone. The 2009 mode share for El Paso (city) commuters are 10.3% for carpooling, 2.4% for transit, 2.5% for walking, and .2% for cycling. In 2016, Walk Score ranked El Paso as the 32nd most walkable of the 50 largest U.S. cities, rating it "car-dependent". The city of El Paso has a slightly lower than average percentage of households without a car. In 2015, 7.4 percent of El Paso households lacked a car, and increased to 8.4 percent in 2016. The national average was 8.7 percent in 2016. El Paso averaged 1.82 cars per household in 2016, compared to a national average of 1.8.

==== Airports ====
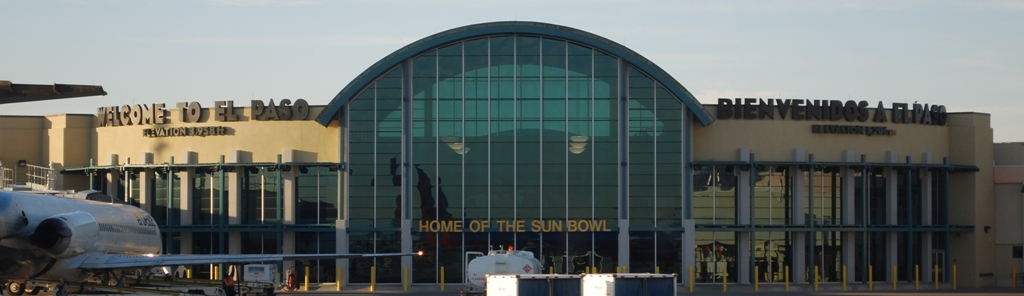
Airport Security Concourse at the El Paso International Airport

- El Paso International Airport, a public airport four miles (6 km) northeast of downtown El Paso. It is the largest commercial airport in West Texas, handling 3,260,556 passengers in 2018. The El Paso International Airport serves the El Paso-Las Cruces Combined Statistical area.
- Biggs Army Airfield, a military airbase serving Fort Bliss.

==== Railroad ====
- Amtrak, the national passenger rail system, serves El Paso at the Union Depot, operating its Sunset Limited/Texas Eagle three times weekly between Los Angeles and New Orleans via San Antonio and Houston and between Los Angeles and Chicago via San Antonio and Fort Worth.
- Freight service is provided by BNSF and Union Pacific.

==== Major highways ====
- I-10: The primary thoroughfare through the city, connecting the city with other major U.S. cities such as Los Angeles, Phoenix, Tucson, San Antonio, Houston, Baton Rouge, New Orleans, Gulfport and Mobile, with the east end located in Jacksonville. I-10 is also a connector to I-25, which connects with the cities of Albuquerque, Santa Fe, Pueblo, Colorado Springs, Denver, Fort Collins, Cheyenne, Casper, and north to the interchange with I-90, located in Buffalo, Wyoming.
- I-110: I-110 is a spur of I-10 providing access to the Bridge of the Americas over the Rio Grande to connect with Avenida Abraham Lincoln in Ciudad Juárez, Mexico.
- US 54: Officially called the Patriot Freeway, it is also known as the North-South Freeway. A business route runs along Dyer Street, the former US 54, from the freeway near Fort Bliss to the Texas–New Mexico state line, where it again rejoins the expressway. The original US 54 was a transcontinental route connecting El Paso with Chicago.

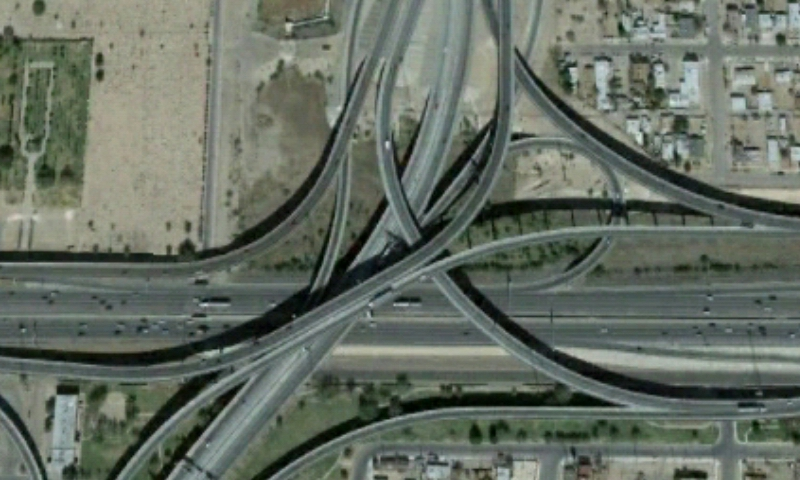
IH-10–US-54 Interchange

- US 62: Santa Fe Street south of Paisano Drive concurrently runs with US 85, Paisano Drive east of Santa Fe Street to Montana Avenue, then Montana Avenue concurrently with US 180.
- US 85: Santa Fe Street south of Paisano Drive concurrently runs with US 62 and Paisano Drive west of Santa Fe Street to I-10.
- US 180: Montana Avenue is a bypass route to the Dallas-Fort Worth Metroplex to the east, and Flagstaff, Arizona to the west.
- SH 20: Alameda Avenue (formerly US 80), Texas Avenue, Mesa Street and Doniphan Drive
- SH 178: Artcraft Road in Northwest El Paso extends from I-10 west to the New Mexico state line, at which point it becomes NM 136, the Pete V. Domenici International Highway.
- Loop 375: Loop 375 encircles the city of El Paso. Between I-10 and Fort Bliss, including the stretch that crosses the Franklin Mountains via Smuggler's Pass, it is Transmountain Road. In the Fort Bliss Military Reservation between northeast and east El Paso, it is officially the Purple Heart Memorial Highway. In East El Paso, the north- and south-bound sections are known as Joe Battle Boulevard, or simply as "the Loop". South of I-10, in the east and westbound portion, it is known as the Cesar Chavez Border Highway, a four-lane expressway which is located along the Mexican border between Downtown El Paso and the Ysleta area. The newest section of Loop 375 is the Border West Expressway, which takes the highway from the Ysleta area and downtown through a narrow gap between UTEP and the Mexican border. Loop 375 continues north back to I-10 with the New Mexico state line 13 miles away.
- Spur 601: Once known as the Inner Loop, it was officially named the Liberty Expressway by the El Paso City Council in April 2010 at the request of then Fort Bliss commander Maj. Gen. Howard Bromberg. It was fully completed on April 27, 2011; it connects the Patriot Freeway (US 54) and Biggs Army Airfield to the Purple Heart Memorial Highway (Loop 375).
- North Loop Drive, as well as Delta Drive between North Loop Drive and Alameda Avenue (Texas Highway 20)
- Zaragoza Road, running more or less north from the Ysleta International Bridge to US 62–180 (Montana Avenue), it lies mostly in east El Paso.
- Texas Farm-to-Market Road 3255 runs north from US 54 to the New Mexico state line in Northeast El Paso and bears the city street name Martin Luther King Boulevard.

==== Mass transit ====
The Sun Metro Mass Transit System operates a system of medium- to large-capacity natural gas-powered buses all around the city of El Paso. In 2011, Sun Metro was named the most outstanding public transit system of the year in all of North America for a mid-size transit system by the American Public Transportation Association.

El Paso County Transit makes trips with small-capacity buses mainly in the eastern El Paso area. South Central Regional Transit District operates two routes from El Paso to Sunland Park, New Mexico and Anthony, New Mexico.

On September 1, 2009, NMDOT Park and Ride began operating commuter bus service to and from Las Cruces, New Mexico.

Historically, El Paso and Ciudad Juarez had a shared streetcar system with a peak electrified route mileage of 64 miles (103 km) in 1920. The first electrified line across the Rio Grande, which opened on January 11, 1902, was preceded by a network that relied on animal labor. The system quickly spread into residential and industrial areas of El Paso. In 1913, a 12-mile (19 km) interurban line was built to Ysleta. At the close of 1943, the holding company El Paso Electric sold its subsidiary, the El Paso Electric Railway Company and its Mexican counterpart, to one of National City Lines' subsidiaries. This resulted in the formation of El Paso City Lines, whose domestic streetcar lines were replaced by buses in 1947. The international streetcar line which crossed the border via the Stanton Street Bridge continued to operate until 1973. In 1977, El Paso City Lines and two other bus companies were bought by the municipality and merged to form Sun City Area Transit (SCAT). In 1987, SCAT restyled itself Sun Metro.

==== Streetcar ====
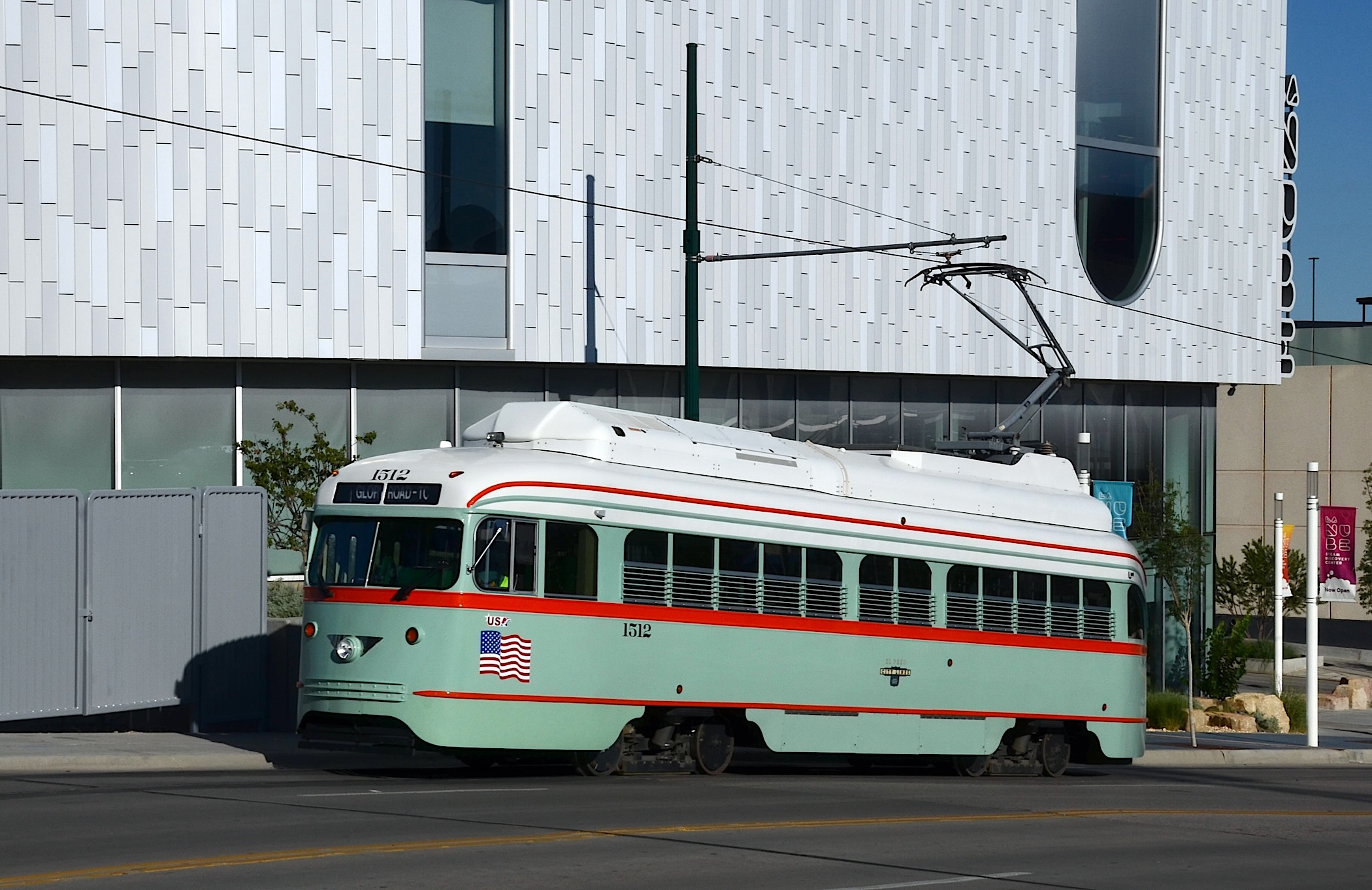
El Paso Streetcar on Santa Fe Street

The El Paso Streetcar is a streetcar system that opened for service on November 9, 2018, and uses a fleet of restored PCC streetcars that had served the city's previous system until its closure in 1974. The system covers 4.8 miles (7.7 km) (round trip) in two loops from Downtown El Paso to University of Texas at El Paso. The system was constructed under the authority of the Camino Real Regional Mobility Authority, but when the major construction was completed, around spring 2018, it was transferred to Sun Metro, for operation and maintenance. As of 2016, construction of the system was projected to cost $97 million. In 2019, it was reported that the system is losing money and that the number of people using it only reached half its goal in the inaugural year. In February, 29, 2025, 110 passengers rode the streetcars, “a 56% increase from February last year,” Canales said. Following a collapse in ridership during the pandemic, ridership in 2021 was 4,170. It was 47,284 in 2022, 89,474 in 2023, and 240,289 in 2024. The figures are from the city of El Paso’s 2025 budget, which shows a 2025 operational cost of $3.2 million.

The Streetcar is now free of charge and runs a full schedule. The current schedule for the train is Monday – Thursday: 7:00 AM – 7:00 PM, Friday: 7:00 AM – 11:00 PM,Saturday: 12:00 PM – 11:00 PM, Sunday: 12:00 PM – 6:00 PM. It adjusts during major holidays and events.

==== International border crossings ====
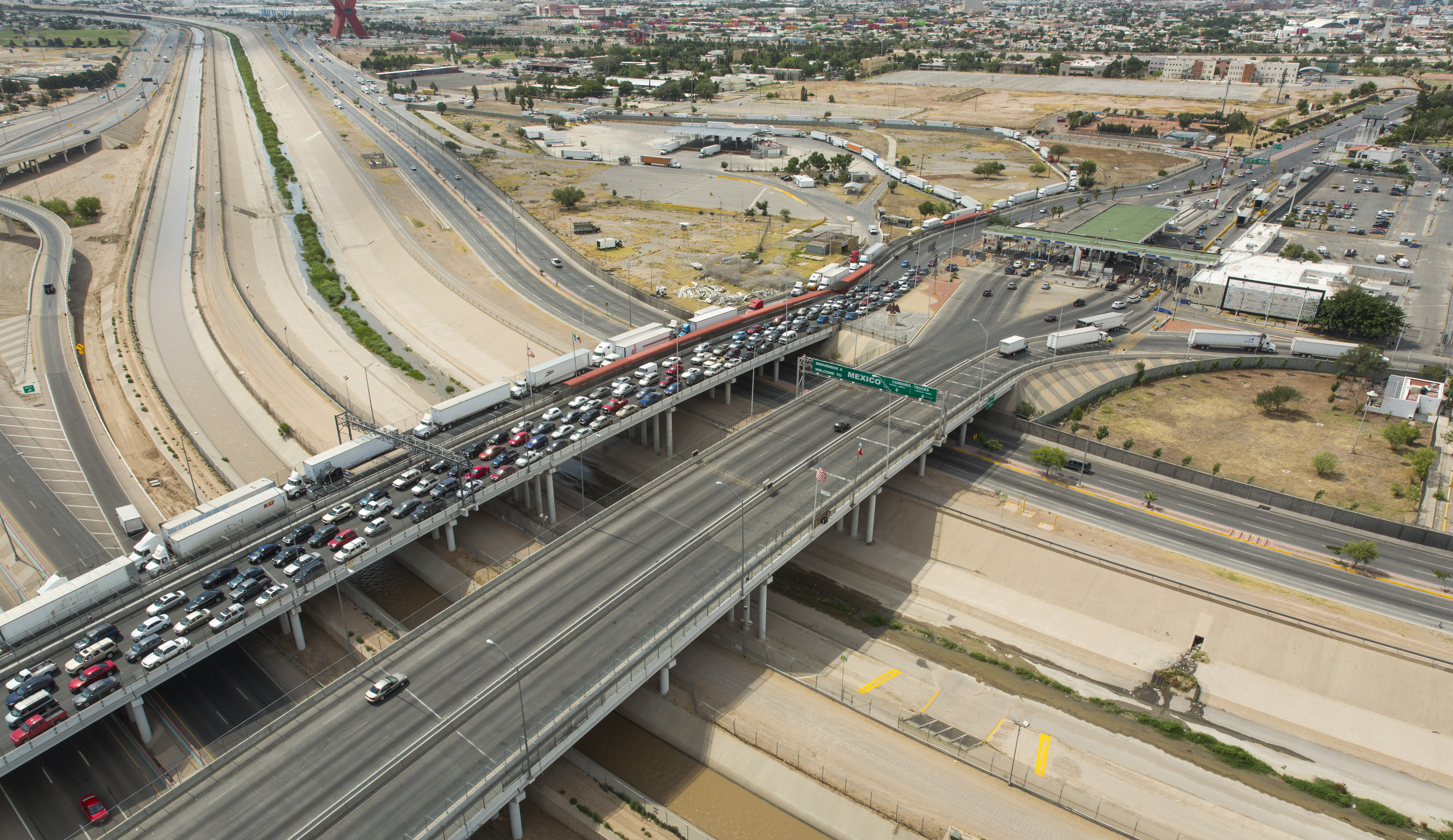
The Bridge of the Americas as seen from El Paso, Texas, in June 2016

The first bridge to cross the Rio Grande at El Paso del Norte was built in the time of Nueva España, over 250 years ago, from wood hauled in from Santa Fe. This bridge is honored by the modern Santa Fe Street Bridge, and Santa Fe Street in downtown El Paso.

Several bridges serve the El Paso–Ciudad Juárez area:

- Bridge of the Americas, also known as the Cordova Bridge.
- Good Neighbor International Bridge, also known as the Stanton Street Bridge
- Paso del Norte International Bridge, also known as the Santa Fe Street Bridge.
- Ysleta–Zaragoza International Bridge, also known as the Zaragoza Bridge.

The city collects tolls at its international bridges, except for the Bridge of the Americas, which is free. All bridges are open year-round.

=== Water ===
The Kay Bailey Hutchison Desalination Plant takes in brackish groundwater from an aquifer that is too salty for human consumption and treats it through reverse osmosis. A joint study by Fort Bliss and El Paso-area city governments found that desalination was a viable method for increasing El Paso's water supply by 25%. The plant on Fort Bliss property desalinates the groundwater of the Hueco Bolson for use by El Paso and Fort Bliss.

=== Animal services ===
The City of El Paso maintains the City of El Paso Animal Services shelter, in the city limits, across from Fort Bliss National Cemetery. The El Paso County Animal Welfare Department, which operates the county animal shelter, is also headquartered in El Paso.

== Sister cities ==
- Ciudad Juárez, Mexico
- (United States) Las Cruces, New Mexico
- (United States) Horizon City, Texas

== See also ==
- Fiesta Drive-In Theater
- List of museums in West Texas
- List of people from El Paso, Texas
- National Register of Historic Places listings in El Paso County, Texas
- El Paso in popular culture
