= History of El Paso, Texas =

Coordinates: 31°47′25″N 106°25′24″W

Founded as El Paso del Norte (at what is now Ciudad Juárez, Mexico) by Spanish Franciscan friars at an important mountain pass, the area became a small agricultural producer though most settlement was south of the river where modern Mexico lies. The city was considered part of New Mexico under Spanish Conquerors and was tied economically to Santa Fe, New Mexico and the Chihuahuan mining districts of San Felipe El Real and San José del Parral.

The Texas Revolution when Texas revolted from Mexico, which itself had recently become independent from Spain, did not involve paseños as the region was a part of Chihuahua. However, after Texas' annexation by the United States the boundary of the state was claimed to include what would become this important trading center.

As railroads were built through the area it boomed as a commercial center. The World Wars and the Texas Oil Boom helped develop the city further. As international trade has become increasingly important in the U.S., and Juárez has grown as a manufacturing center, El Paso's economic importance has continued to expand.

== Pre-Columbian era ==
Archeological evidence at the Keystone Wetlands and Hueco Tanks sites indicates thousands of years of human settlement within the El Paso region. A hueco is a Spanish term for a hollowed out cavity for holding water, or for pounding maize. The inhabitants during this era were maize farmers. Mulvihill notes that the images are notable because they are painted with hematite, rather than pecked into the rock, as are the petroglyphs to be found in New Mexico.

The Jumano, Suma and Manso people were identified as present by the earliest Spanish explorers. The Jumano people were hunter gatherers who typically hunted Bison and frequently traveled long distances between modern day El Paso and New Mexico. The Mansos lived from immediate area of El Paso to Las Cruces. The Sumas lived along the Rio Grande southeast of El Paso, as well as in portions of northern Mexico. Both the Mansos and Suma lived in small communities in homes constructed of straw, brush and poles. Neither groups practiced horticulture, instead relying on native plants and animals for food including rabbit, rats, fish, mesquite beans, prickly pear, agave and yucca.

== Arrival of Spaniards ==
Spanish explorer Juan de Oñate, born in present-day Zacatecas, Mexico, was the first explorer to arrive at the Rio Grande near El Paso (near the current small town of San Elizario, which is about 30 miles (48 km) downstream of El Paso), where he ordered his expedition party to rest and where the official act of possession, La Toma, was executed and celebrated, on April 30, 1598.

El Paso del Norte (the present day Ciudad Juárez), was founded on the south bank of the Río Bravo del Norte (Rio Grande) in 1659 by Fray García de San Francisco. Agriculture flourished thanks to the complex irrigation system built by the Spanish and Indians, including a massive earthen dam. Vineyards and fruits constituted the bulk of the regional production. The Spanish Crown and the local authorities of El Paso del Norte had made several land concessions to bring agricultural production to the northern bank of the river in present-day El Paso, like the Bracito Grant. However, the Apaches dissuaded production and settlers to cross the river. The water provided a natural defense against them.

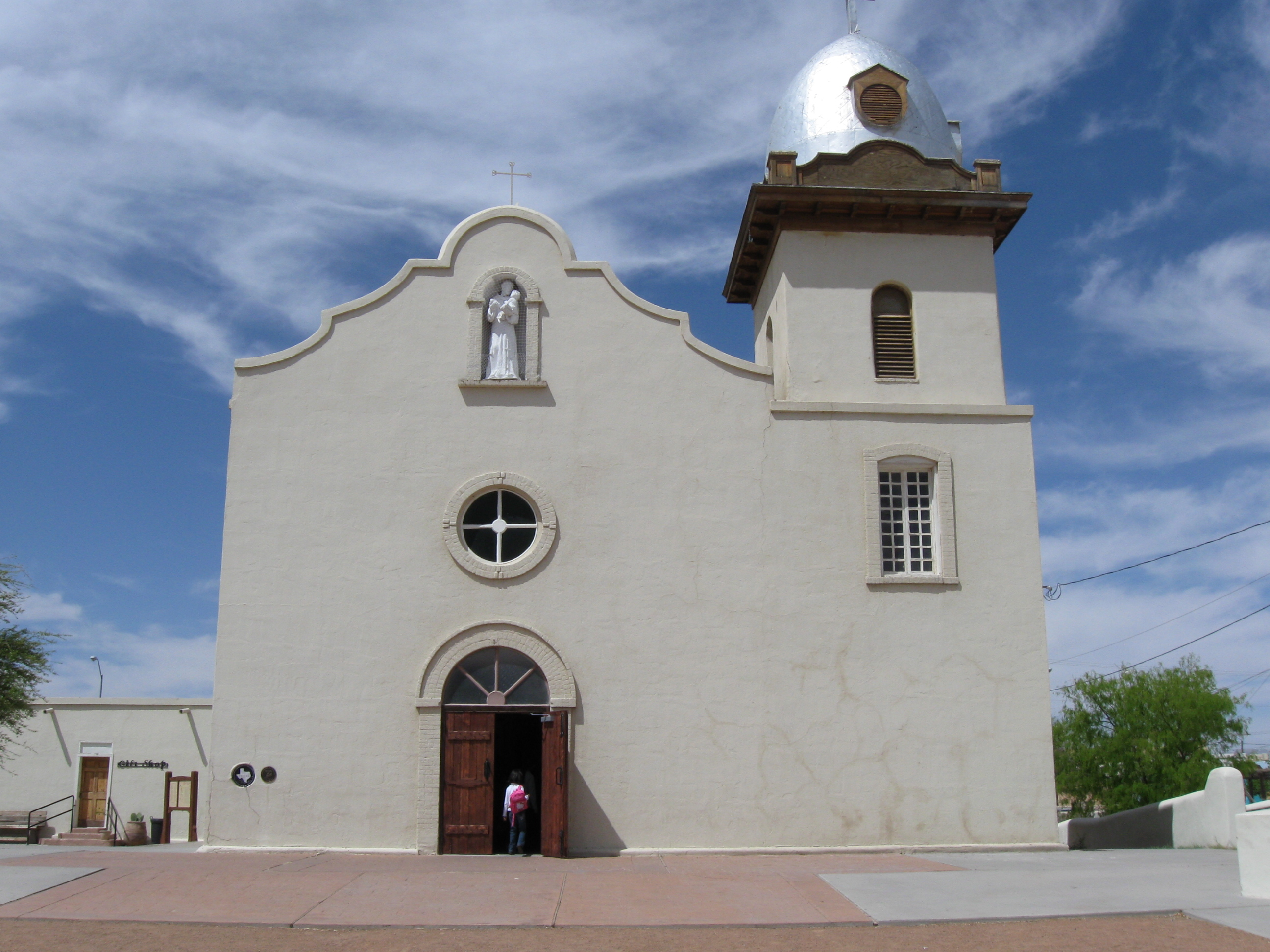
La Mision de Corpus Christi de San Antonio de la Ysleta del Sur

In 1680, after the successful Pueblo Revolt that decimated the Spanish colonies in northern New Mexico, El Paso became the base for Spanish governance of the territory of New Mexico, although the largest civilian center was in the Real de San Lorenzo. From El Paso, the Spaniards led by Diego de Vargas, grouped once again to recolonize the precious Spanish territory that was centered in Santa Fe and stretched from Socorro (New Mexico) to the areas that included Taos. The eighteenth century witnessed the area's rapid growth, giving the district a population of over 5,000. These included Spaniards, criollos, mestizos, and indigenous spread along the river from El Paso to San Lorenzo, Senecú, Ysleta, and El Rancho de los Tiburcios. The military post assigned to the settlement's defense was moved over the eighteenth century to various sites, including San José, San Elizario, and El Carrizal.

Historical records indicated that the first permanent agricultural enterprise north of the Río Grande located in present-day El Paso was the Ponce de León Ranch, on land granted in 1825. Earlier efforts—such as the "lost mission" of Nuestra Señora de las Caldas and El Rancho de los Tiburcios—had been discouraged through Indian raids and floods.

El Paso remained largely undeveloped during most of the period of Spanish control. Instead, settlement was centered on El Paso del Norte (present day Ciudad Juárez) on the south bank of the Rio Grande. However, the Spanish crown and the local authorities of El Paso del Norte had made several land concessions to bring agricultural production to the northern bank of the river in present-day El Paso, frequent Indian raids and warfare overwhelmed any attempts. The Apache Wars and subsequent Comanche Wars left northern Mexico, then including present-day New Mexico, Texas, and Coahuila, in a state of perpetual instability. Consequently, present-day Juárez remained the northernmost villa with the Río Bravo del Norte, and Apache attacks dissuading settlement and development north. The water of the river, the sand dunes (médanos) to the south, and the fortifications at Paso del Norte and El Real de San Lorenzo provided a natural defense against further raids; however, in some decades, several-thousand-strong Apache armies made raids deep into Mexico, slaughtering the male population and enslaving women and children. As a result, the Rio Grande proved to be a boundary line of actual Hispanic presence.

== Texas independence ==
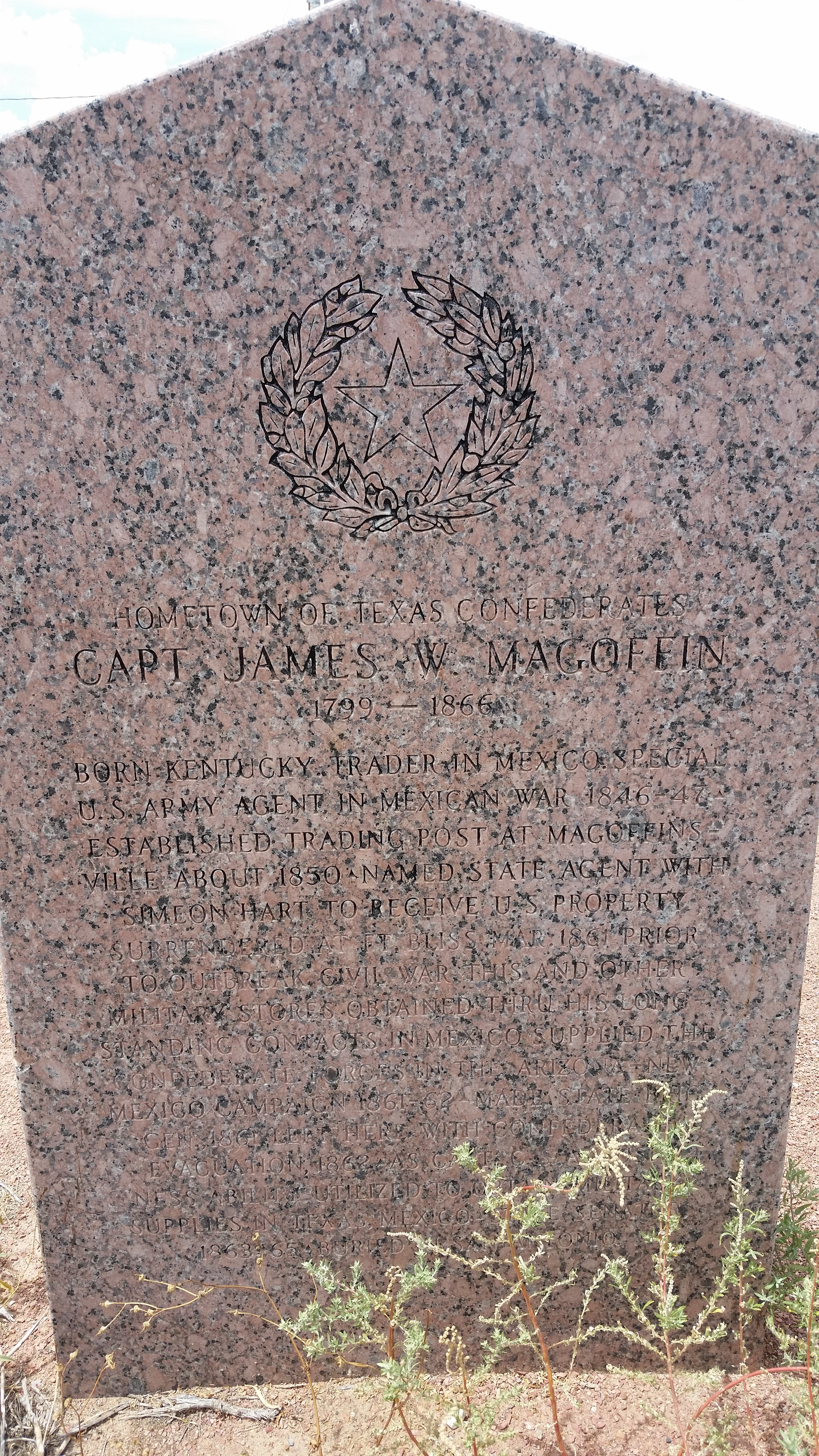
Texas Historical Marker for Capt. James W. Magoffin (1799–1866)

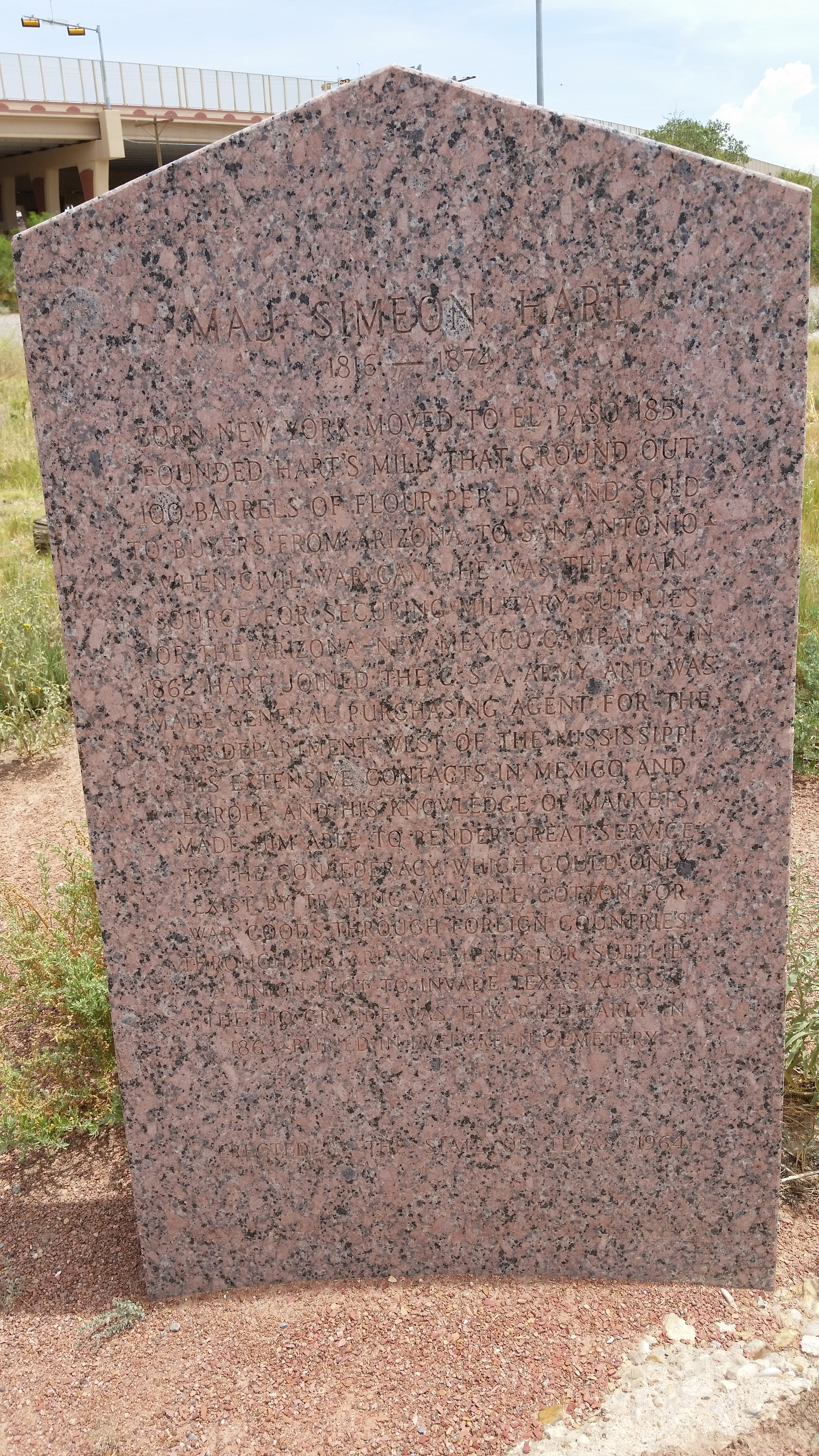
Texas Historical Marker for Maj. Simeon Hart (1816–1874)

El Paso was the southernmost locality of the Provincia de Nuevo Mexico (modern New Mexico). It communicated with Santa Fe and Mexico City by the Royal Road. Few foreign travelers, outside of Spanish merchants and officials, ventured that far north. It took six months for a trading caravan to reach Mexico City. American spies, traders and fur trappers visited the area since 1804 (Spanish documents curiously described these interlopers as "españoles de Inglaterra" meaning "Spaniards from England") and some intermarried with the area's Hispanic elite. Among these were Kentucky native Hugh Stephenson, who married doña Juana María de Azcárate. Notable travelers included Zebulon Pike. American settler families only arrived in significant numbers, after the Mexican–American War in 1849.

Although there was no combat in the region during the Mexican Independence, Paso del Norte experienced the negative effects it had on the trade of its wines and produce that kept the town alive. It also experienced a major avulsion that left the towns of Ysleta, San Elizario and Socorro on the other side of the Rio Grande.

In the first Mexican constitution (1824), given the dominance that Chihuahuan merchants had on New Mexico, Paso del Norte went to the state of Chihuahua after being part of New Mexico for 200 years. The town elected its first local government in 1825 and opened the first official school in 1829.

The Texas revolution (1836) was not felt in the region. The area was never considered part of Texas until 1848. The Battle of El Brazito near Las Cruces was fought by Missouri volunteers led by Col. Alexander William Doniphan, for whom Doniphan Drive was named, in El Paso. Given the blurry reclamations of the Texas Republic that wanted a chunk of the Santa Fe trade, the Treaty of Guadalupe Hidalgo effectively made the settlements on the north bank of the river a formal American settlement, separate from Old El Paso de Norte on the Mexican side. A number of loyal Mexican families abandoned New Mexico and were resettled to the region south of El Paso's lower valley settlements, where, under the leadership of Guadalupe Miranda—the last secretary of Mexico's New Mexican government—sought to provide land and funds to displaced families. Mexican Catholic clergy also were active in these communities, with some of the most notable including Father Antonio Borrajo.

The present Texas-New Mexico boundary, placing El Paso on the Texas side, was drawn in the Compromise of 1850. This compromise transferred much of Texas' northwestern lands, which the state government did not effectively control, to the federal government, where they became parts of modern-day states including New Mexico. El Paso, however, despite geographic, historic, and economic connections to New Mexico, was successfully retained by Texas in the Compromise of 1850, largely because it had recently organized local residents into a county government and was thus able to claim El Paso as integral Texas territory. (A similar plan to incorporate Santa Fe into a Texas county failed, and Santa Fe was therefore removed from Texas and placed in New Mexico.)

A number of important developments during the 1850s shaped the character of the area north of the river. The Stephenson-Azcárate family acquired a 900-acre (3.6 km^{2}) tract from the Ponce de León grant in the vicinity of today's I-10 "Spaghetti Bowl" interchange. It was called "El Rancho de la Concordia" or "Stephensonville" after Hugh Stephenson's childhood home in Concordia, Missouri. The Archbishop of Durango later gave permission for the blessing of a private chapel there, San José de la Concordia, whose ruins persisted until the 1930s; its camposanto or burial grounds were the origins of Concordia Cemetery. Further west, a settlement on Coons' Rancho called Franklin became the nucleus of El Paso, Texas. El Paso County was established in March 1850, with San Elizario as the first county seat. The United States Senate fixed a boundary between Texas and New Mexico at the thirty-second parallel, thus largely ignoring history and topography. Following the establishment of the San Antonio-El Paso Road, a military post called The Post opposite El Paso (meaning opposite El Paso del Norte, across the Rio Grande) was established in 1854. That same year San Antonio-El Paso Mail was established, passing through Franklin in 1854. In 1857, the San Antonio-San Diego Mail Line, the first mail coach route from the East to California passed through Franklin, soon followed by the Butterfield Overland Mail in 1858. A year later pioneer Anson Mills completed his plat of the town, calling it El Paso, a name that resulted in endless confusion until the name of the town across the river, El Paso del Norte, was changed to Ciudad Juárez in 1888.

El Paso was incorporated in 1873 and encompassed the small area communities that had developed along the river (Magoffinsville, Concordia, Hart's Mill). Ben Dowell, a Mexican–American War veteran and former Confederate Captain, would be elected as the first mayor.

=== The Confederate States of America ===
During the U.S. Civil War, Texas, along with most other southern slave states, declared that they had seceded from the Union to join the Confederacy. Confederate forces controlled Fort Bliss in 1861 until the city's occupation by the Union California Column in 1862. It was then headquarters for the 5th Regiment California Volunteer Infantry until December 1864. After the war concluded, the town's population began to grow.

== County seat at Tigua land in Ysleta ==
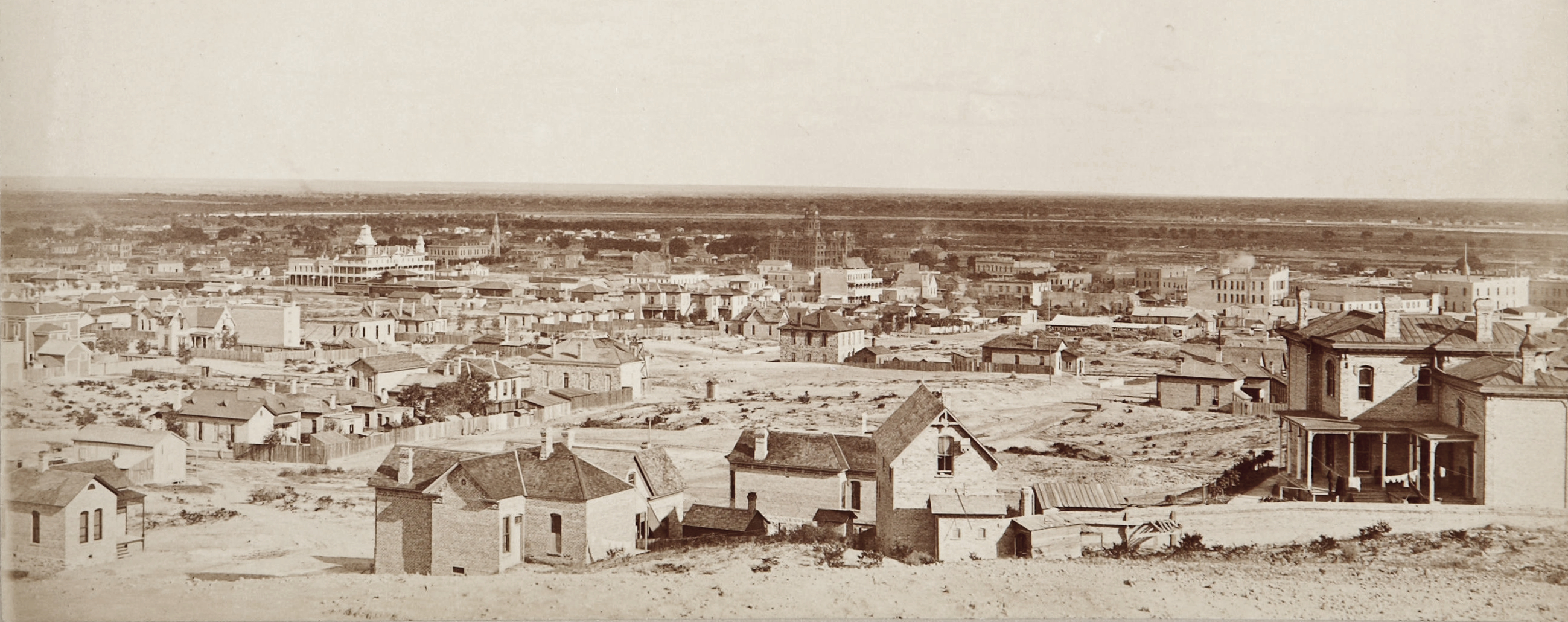
El Paso circa 1880

The Tigua Indians had occupied at least 36 sq mi (93 km^{2}) of land around Ysleta, land that King Charles V of Spain had deeded to them, since the 1680 pueblo revolt against the Spaniards in New Mexico. In 1874, the Texas Legislature passed "An Act to Repeal an Act to Incorporate the Town of Ysleta in El Paso County", with a six-month delay of effect that resulted in the conveyance of over 500 parcels of Tigua property to Americans. The Tiguas lost almost all of their land.

The El Paso county seat was moved to Ysleta that year, from San Elizario, and stayed until it was moved to El Paso in 1883. These were the years of the San Elizario Salt War and other conflicts between the Mexicans, the Americans, the Tigua, and the Apaches. The Hispanic population saw its leadership in the old Mexican clergy—particularly in the Spanish-born Antonio Borrajo—and the mercantile elite, who sought to maintain ownership of community resources within the Hispanic community.

== Frontier town ==
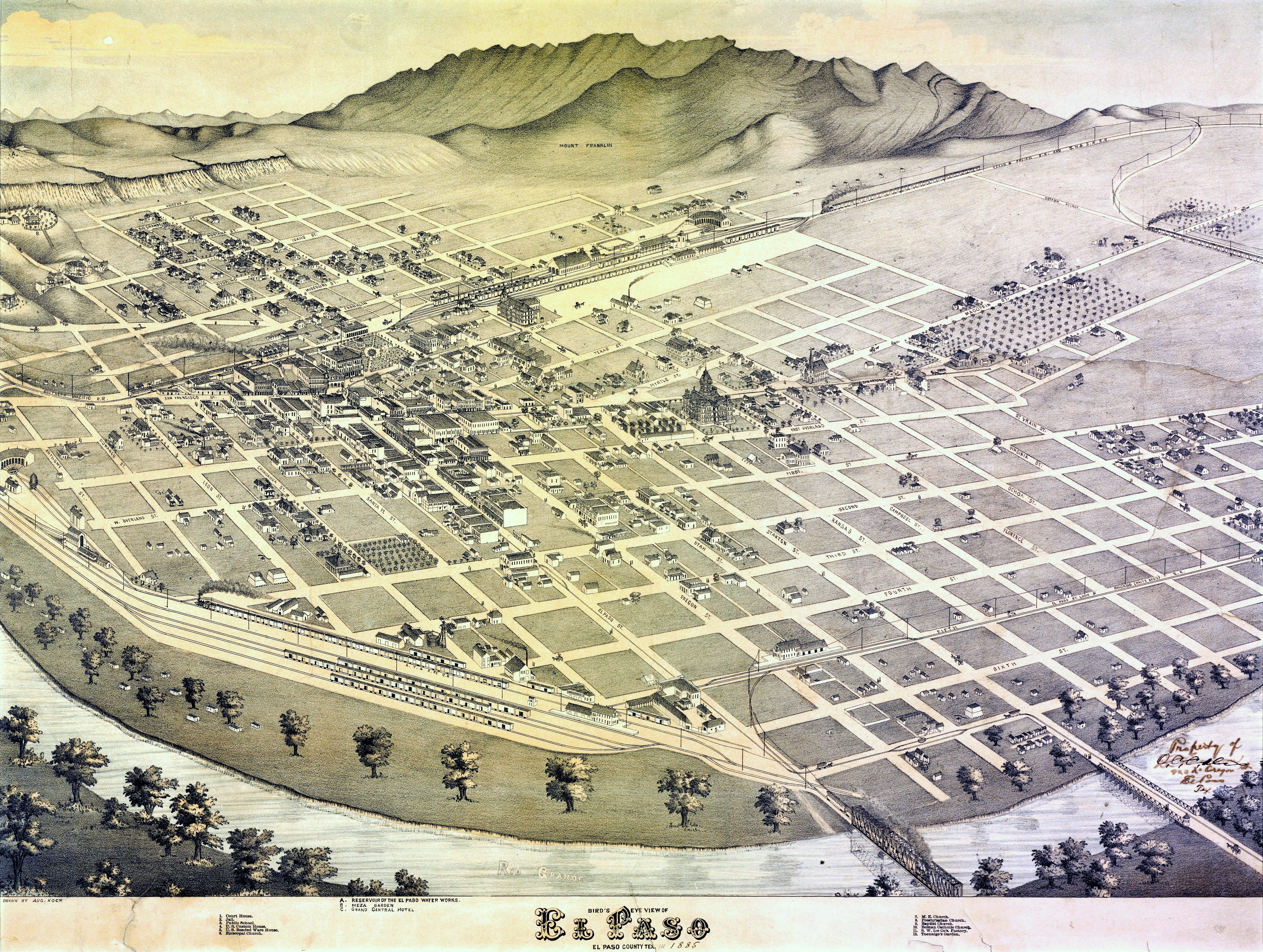
Map of the city in 1886

With the arrival of the Southern Pacific, the Texas and Pacific, and the Atchison, Topeka and Santa Fe railroads in 1881, the population boomed to 10,000 by the 1890 census. With a tempting green valley and a nearly perfect climate year-around, the town attracted a constant stream of newcomers, including many merchants, entrepreneurs, and professionals who came to the region to benefit from the Mexican Free Trade zone. Others arrived seeking a cure for respiratory ailments in the warm, dry climate. Various sanatoriums were established catering to their needs. Small immigrant communities–Jewish, Italian, and Chinese–also arrived, adding to the diversity of the bustling town. The origins of the Jewish community dates from at least the 1880s, with the first Reform synagogue, Temple Mt. Sinai, built in 1898. The cosmopolitan community established many educational and cultural institutions, including a symphony orchestra that is the oldest in Texas. The American Catholic hierarchy gradually exerted control over the El Paso Valley, sending out Jesuit priests who developed a network of parishes and schools over the 1880s–1910s. Their work established the foundations for the Diocese of El Paso, created by Pius X in 1914. Among the dozens of Jesuits active in El Paso, one of the most notable was Father Carlos Pinto (1841–1919), known as "the apostle of El Paso," for his work among the Mexican population. A native of southern Italy, Pinto arrived in Northern New Mexico and Colorado in the 1870s, working there until he was assigned to El Paso ca. 1890. Pinto established the parishes of the Immaculate Conception (El Paso's first English-speaking Catholic Parish in 1893), Sacred Heart/Sagrado Corazón (El Paso's first Spanish-speaking Catholic Parish in 1893), St. Ignatius (1905), Guardian Angel (1908), and Holy Family (1914) parishes, among others. Working with the Sisters of Loretto at the Foot of the Cross, the Jesuits established schools at these parishes. A distinct architectural style is evident in these structures that have yet to attract serious historical research. The Jesuit High School in Ysleta was briefly expanded into a junior college in the mid-twentieth century.

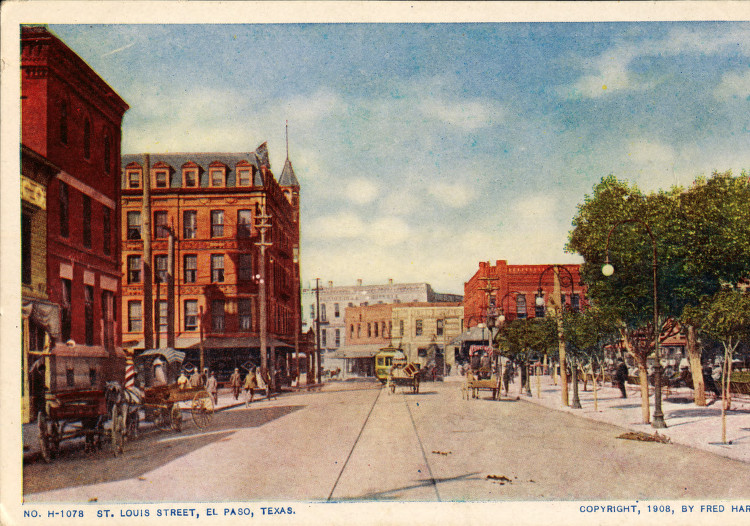
St. Louis Street, El Paso, Texas (postcard, circa 1908)

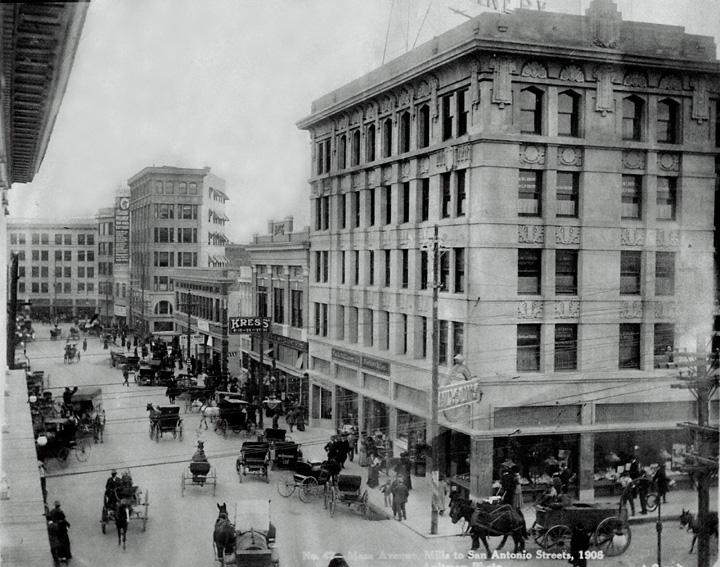
Downtown El Paso in 1908

However, as with other frontier regions, undesirables also arrived: gamblers, gunfighters, thieves, murderers, and prostitutes. After the arrival of the railroads, El Paso became a boomtown. Some historians, like Leon C. Metz, have stressed in their narratives the lawlessness that accompanied the arrival of Anglos, with "scores of saloons, dance halls, gambling establishments, and houses of prostitution lin[ing] the main streets." El Paso hired a town marshal with rough reputation, Dallas Stoudenmire, who was known to shoot first and ask questions later. The "Four Dead in Five Seconds Gunfight" took place here on April 14, 1881. This was prior to the Gunfight at the O.K. Corral in Tombstone, Arizona. Stoudenmire, the sixth marshal in eight months, was hired to "clean" and tame a remote, violent and wild town. Stoudenmire was an effective marshal due to his fierce reputation and dexterity with his pistols. He effectively intimidated a violence-hardened town and used fear to control the City Council. On May 28, 1882, the City Council announced they were firing the marshal. Stoudenmire learned of this discussion, he entered the Council Chambers; they were terrified and remained quiet. Stoudenmire strolled up and down the chamber as he scolded, cursed and threatened to shoot. Drawing out and twirling his pistols, he threatened, "I can straddle every God-damn aldermen on this council!" The coerced Council members quickly voted unanimously to retain Stoudenmire as town marshal. Stoudenmire glared at them for a few seconds before he calmed down and put away his pistols. Knowing Stoudenmire's fearsome reputation, the Mayor defused a tense situation by calling for an abrupt adjournment. Stoudenmire exited the Chamber and a potentially fatal incident was averted.

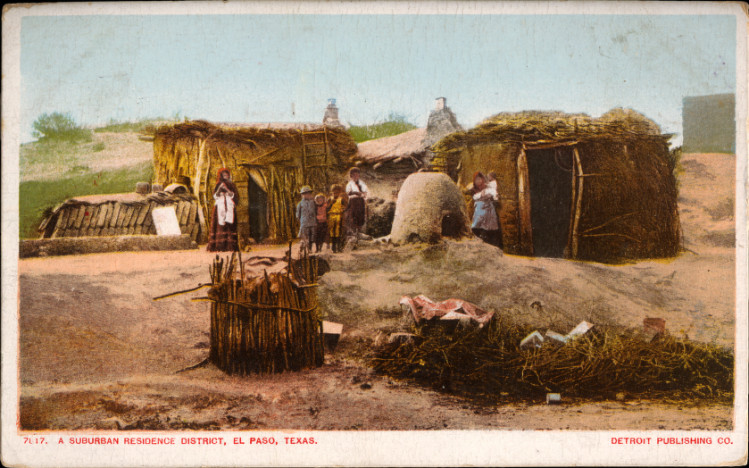
Suburban residential district, El Paso, Texas (postcard, circa 1908)

In 1883 the county seat was moved from Ysleta, Texas to El Paso. This was decided in a strongly disputed election in which counted votes were nearly three times the number of voters.

In 1887 a smelter was established by Robert Safford Towne of Kansas City Consolidated Smelting west of town for the purpose of processing lead and copper ore imported from Mexico. This smelting facility was subsequently purchased by Asarco in 1899. Over time, two small settlements developed around the smelter, acquiring the Hispanicized name "La Esmelda", or "Smeltertown". The Catholic parish of Santa Rosalía y San José del Río served these communities.

Prostitution and gambling flourished until World War I, when the Department of the Army pressured El Paso authorities to crack down on vice. Many of these activities continued in neighboring Ciudad Juárez, especially during the Prohibition, which benefited bars and saloons on the Mexican side of the border. The Concordia Cemetery, also known as El Paso's Boot Hill, is now preserved by the Concordia Heritage Association.

== Taft–Díaz assassination attempt ==
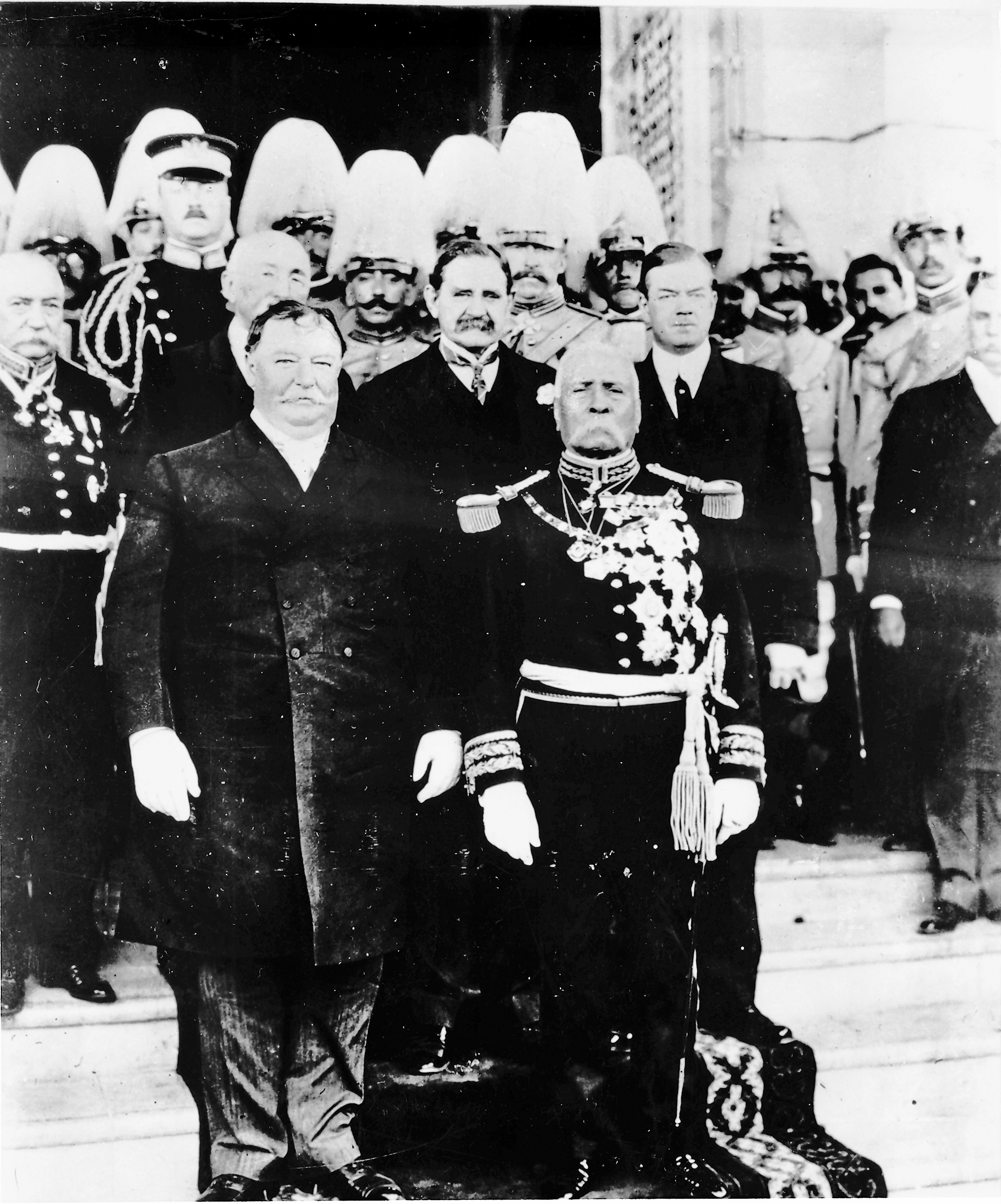
Taft and Porfirio Díaz, historic first presidential summit, Ciudad Juárez, Mexico, 1909

In 1909, William Howard Taft and Porfirio Díaz planned a summit in El Paso, Texas, and Ciudad Juárez, Mexico, a historic first meeting between a U.S. president and a Mexican president and also the first time an American president would cross the border into Mexico But tensions rose on both sides of the border, including threats of assassination, so the Texas Rangers, 4,000 U.S. and Mexican troops, U.S. Secret Service agents, FBI agents and U.S. marshals were all called in to provide security. Frederick Russell Burnham, the celebrated scout, was put in charge of a 250 private security detail hired by John Hays Hammond, a nephew of Texas Ranger John Coffee Hays, who in addition to owning large investments in Mexico was a close friend of Taft from Yale and a U.S. vice-presidential candidate in 1908. On October 16, the day of the summit, Burnham and Private C.R. Moore discovered a man holding a concealed palm pistol standing at the El Paso Chamber of Commerce building along the procession route. Burnham and Moore captured, disarmed, and arrested the assassin within only a few feet of Taft and Díaz.

== The Mexican Revolution ==
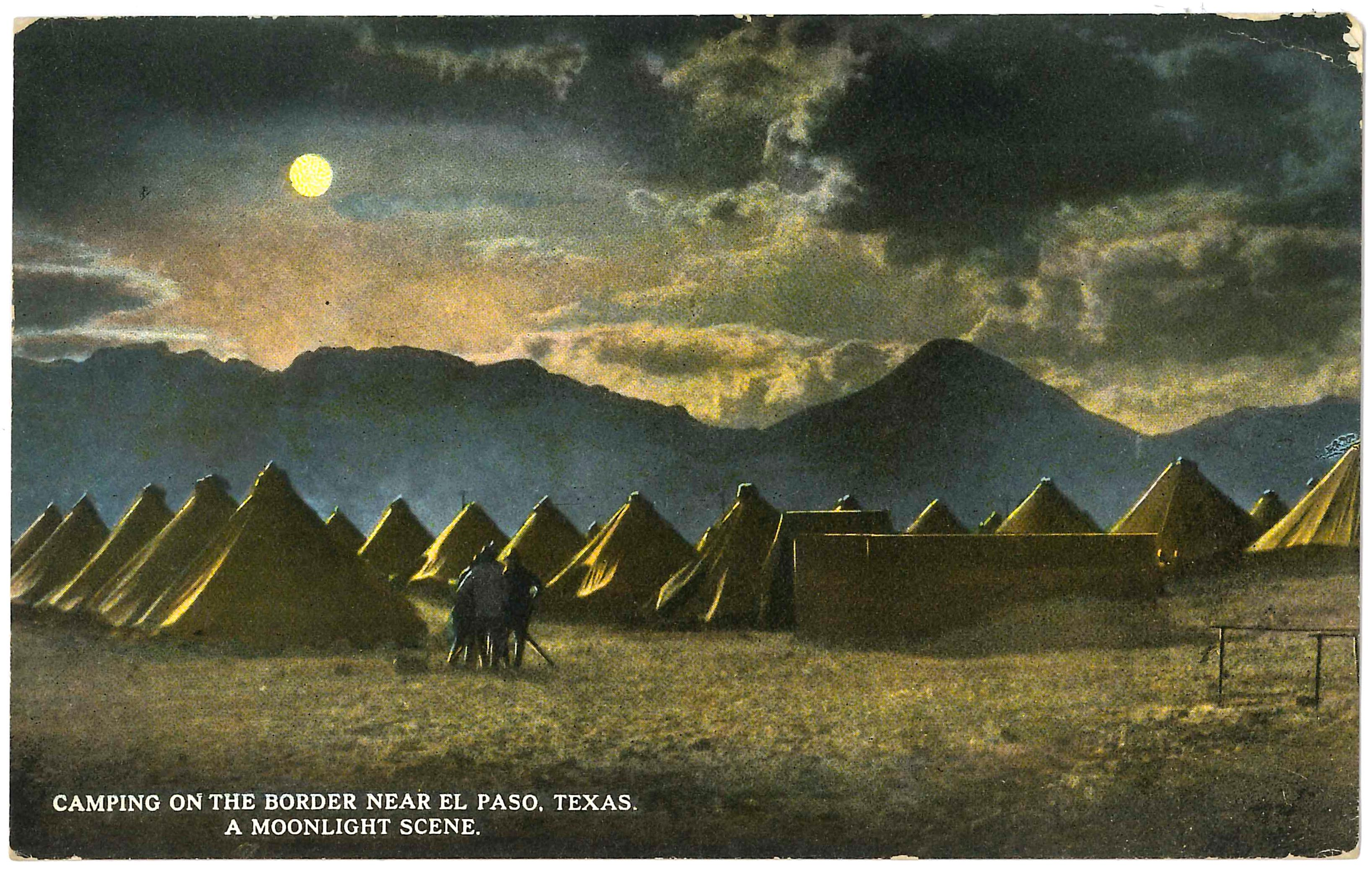
General Pershing's punitive expedition camp near the border, El Paso, Texas (postcard, printed and mailed 1916): Franklin Mountains, left-to-right (i.e., south-to-north) are: Ranger Peak, Sugarloaf Mountain, and part of South Franklin Mountain

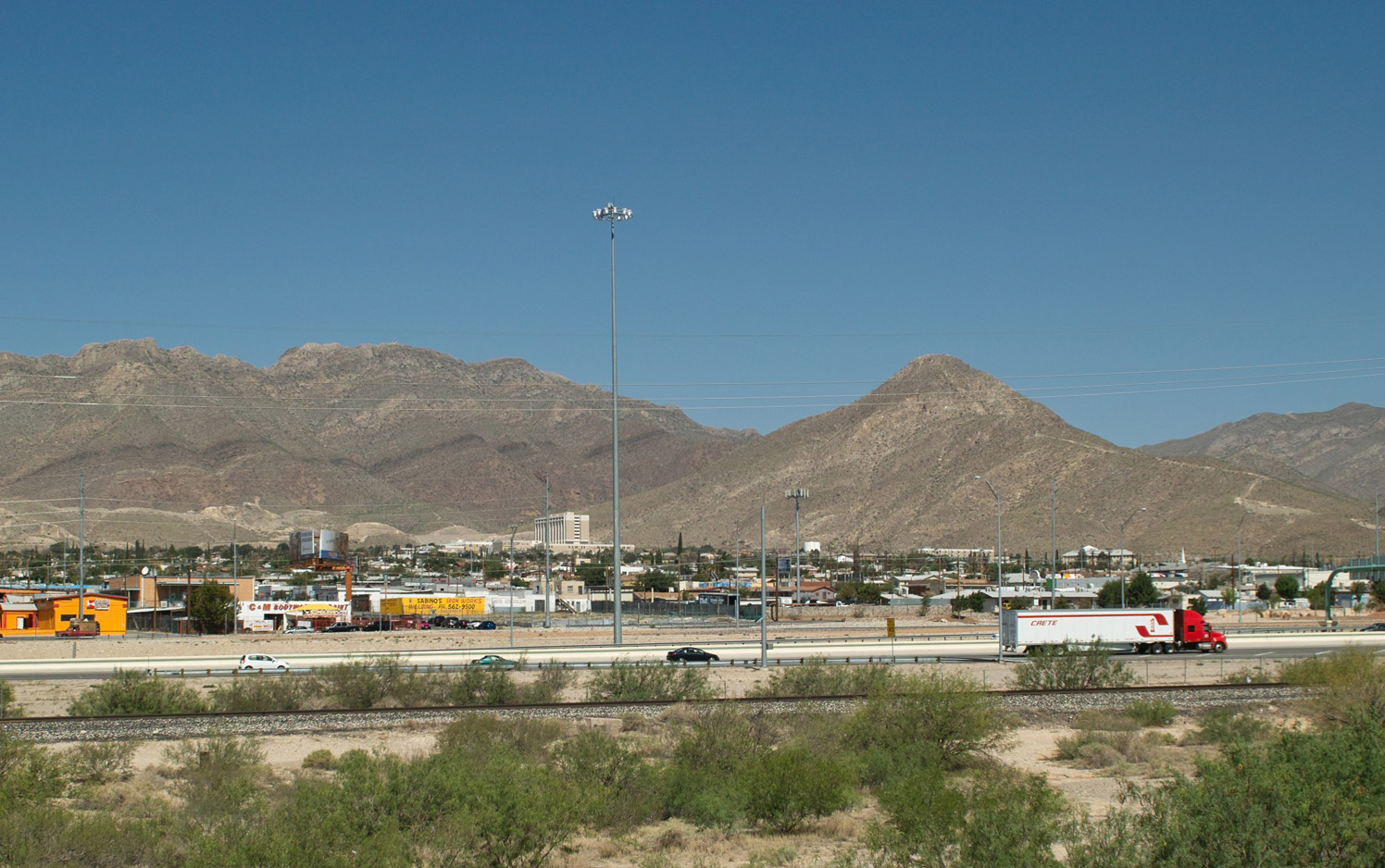
A modern view of the mountains from the approximate location of the camp pictured above, near the Cassidy Rd. west entrance to Fort Bliss

The Mexican Revolution (1910–1920) began in 1910, and Ciudad Juárez was the focus of intense fighting. Occasionally, stray shots killed civilians on the El Paso side. El Paso became a center of intrigue as various exiled leaders including Victoriano Huerta and (for a time) Pancho Villa were seen in the city. In January 1914, General John Joseph Pershing was stationed at Fort Bliss, where he was responsible for security along the border and mounted the ill-fated Pancho Villa Expedition against Pancho Villa after the infamous raid on Columbus, New Mexico on March 9, 1916. During this time period many refugees from Mexico fled to El Paso to escape the violence and economic disruption of the Revolution.

A significant Mexican middle class population developed cultural, social, and educational institutions catering to their needs, including many located in central El Paso and in the Sunset Heights area. These included the Ateneo Porfirio Díaz, the Casino Mexicano (housed in the Toltec Building), Professor Servando Esquivel's Colegio Palmore, and the Colegio de las Hermanas de Jesús y María. The Jesuit Order, expelled from Mexico during the Revolution, played an important role in the development of community institutions and schools, aiding the American and Italian Jesuits already active in El Paso. They staffed parishes like Santo Angel, San Ignacio, and Sagrado Corazón in South El Paso and the Sagrada Familia, in Sunset Heights, as well as a chapel in Smeltertown. South El Paso street was the premier artistic and cultural center of Mexican El Paso, with over a dozen cinemas and theaters that featured the latest films, as well as vaudeville performers, tandas skits, carpas comics, nightclubs, and the occasional touring Spanish-language theatrical and opera company, such as that of the grande dame of the Mexican stage, Virginia Fábregas. Mexican cinemas in El Paso were important to the development of subtitles. Around the start of the 20th century, bilingual interpreters called out in Spanish the English-language text of American movies, and this gradually gave way to on-screen translations. Azteca Films—a leading production company in mid 20th century Mexico, was housed in El Paso in the 1930s–1950s, and brought to South El Paso street theaters premiere screenings featuring stars like María Félix.

== The Roaring 20s, the Great Depression, the Repatriation, and the Second World War ==
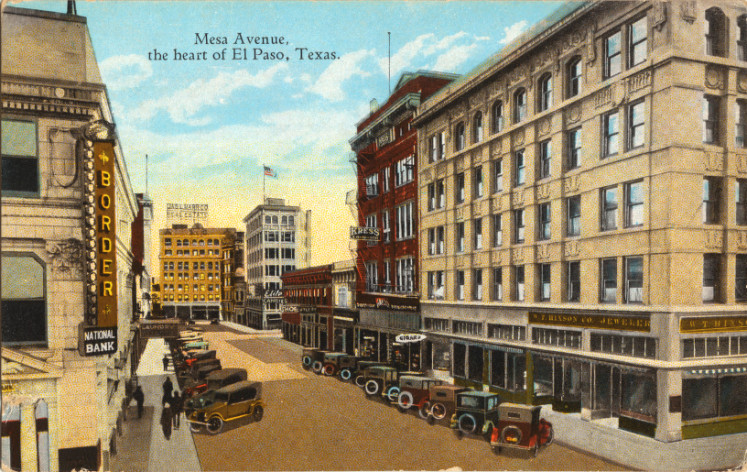
Mesa Avenue, the heart of El Paso, Texas (postcard, circa 1917)

Beginning in the 1920s and into the 1930s, El Paso became the birthplace of several locally and nationally well-known businesses and events. In 1930, Conrad Hilton opened his first high-rise hotel in El Paso, the now Plaza Hotel. The Plaza Theatre opened on September 12, 1930. The 1920s and early 1930s would prove to be a particularly violent period in El Paso's history. During World War One the city's legal saloons were shuttered by wartime liquor policies and remained so in the months that followed the Armistice with the passage of the Dean Act, a statewide prohibition law that would remain in effect until 1935. However, given the city's proximity to Juarez, where nightclubs, dance halls and gambling dens flourished in the 1920s and where alcohol remained legal, El Paso would become a major hub in the illicit liquor trade during both state and nationwide prohibition. Between 1920 and 1933, there were perhaps hundreds of shootouts between area lawmen and smugglers in and around El Paso resulting in the deaths of numerous local and federal officers and countless bootleggers. Simultaneously, the narcotics trade along the Rio Grande also flourished, setting the stage for the drug wars that would plague the region in the decades to come.

In 1934, Walter Varney and Louis Mueller established the passenger airline called Varney Speed Lines in El Paso and operated out of the old El Paso Municipal Airport (1934–36) and then the El Paso International Airport. After the airline was taken over in 1937 by Robert Six, he relocated its headquarters to Denver, Colorado and renamed it with the more recognized name of Continental Airlines, as was known until its purchase by United Airlines in 2010. Although Continental Airlines would have its headquarters stationed in Denver, El Paso was still a major hub for the airline up until the late 1980s.

The college football Sun Bowl has been held in El Paso since 1936 and is the second oldest bowl game in the nation. Second only to the Rose Bowl.

The Great Depression greatly affected the city, halting its boom years. Many moved away, seeking opportunity elsewhere in the West, particularly in Tucson and Phoenix, which boomed in the 1940s thanks to the defense industries established there. El Paso experienced an influx of Mexicans and Mexican Americans expelled from other parts of the country between 1931 and 1934, when some 400,000 were forcibly "repatriated." The Civilian Conservation Corps as well as the Work Projects Administration aided many of the unemployed, who were hired to do work on public buildings and building roads and infrastructure, such as Scenic Drive. Another important project of the period was the privately funded Cristo Rey shrine and road project.

== Post-war era ==
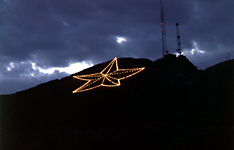
The El Paso Star lies on the far southeast face of the Franklin Mountains. It was erected in 1940 by the El Paso Electric Company.

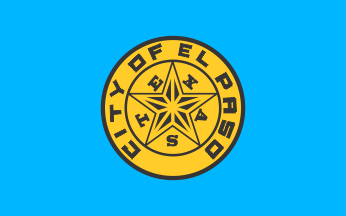
Former city flag of El Paso, used from 1948 to 1960.

After the Second World War, Wernher von Braun and other German rocket scientists were brought to Fort Bliss in El Paso, along with many of the V2 rockets and rocket parts, starting the American rocket program; they were later moved to Huntsville, Alabama. One V2 rocket is still on display at Fort Bliss. The popular drink, the Margarita, was another famous invention given a home in El Paso. It is claimed to have been first mixed in the El Paso-Juárez area at Tommy's Place Bar on July 4, 1945, by Francisco "Pancho" Morales. Morales originally left bartending in Mexico to become a US citizen. He is listed in the Texas Almanac's Sesquicentennial Edition (1857–2007, under M) Obituaries of famous Texans. His story is best captured in an October 1973 Texas Monthly article "The Man Who Invented the Margarita" by Brad Cooper, and later in his obituary in the Washington Post on January 2, 1997.

From the Second World War until the 1980s, El Paso grew rapidly into a sprawling city. The expansion of Fort Bliss from a frontier post to a major Cold War military center brought in thousands of soldiers, dependents, and retirees. The industrial economy was dominated by copper smelting, oil refining, and the proliferation of low wage industries (particularly garment making), which drew thousands of Mexican immigrants. New housing subdivisions were built, expanding El Paso far to the west, northeast and east of its original core areas.

With the election of Raymond Telles, the city's first Hispanic mayor in 1957, the demand for civil rights amongst the Hispanic population began. Stretching into the tumultuous 1960s, and converging with America's anti-war and civil rights demonstrations, great strides were achieved that became evident in the 1970s. While African Americans were integrated into then Texas Western College in 1954, greater changes came in the 1960s and 1970s as the city's Mexican American population, largely under the leadership of LULAC and Veterans' Groups, moved to provide greater educational opportunities for Mexican American or Chicano youth.

In 1963, the U.S. agreed to cede Chamizal, a long-disputed part of El Paso, to Mexico due to changes in the course of the Rio Grande, which forms the international boundary between the two countries. The area boundaries were rationalized and the Rio Grande was re-channeled. A former island in the river was re-developed. The Chamizal National Memorial, administered by the National Park Service is now a major park in El Paso; El Chamizal is the corresponding park in Juárez.

Over the 1960s and 1970s, El Paso's economy boomed, benefiting from low wages, the international crossing, and regional transportation networks. Particularly successful were a number of clothing manufacturers (and the sweatshops that serviced them), providing a livelihood to thousands of Mexican Americans and Mexicans. The development of the maquiladora industry in Ciudad Juárez also aided in the development of the textile and clothing industry. Growth was not without conflict, as Mexican American and Mexican seamstresses sought to improve their working conditions, and organized labor unions that businessmen worked hard to defeat.

Since 1990, the local economy has been adversely affected by competition with low wage labor abroad, and the closure of the main copper smelter due to fluctuating metal prices, and excessive lead contamination found throughout many of the surrounding areas. The implementation of the North American Free Trade Agreement in 1994 affected the local economy, with transport, retail, and service firms expanding, and the accelerated loss of many industrial jobs. El Paso is sensitive to changes in the Mexican economy and the regulation of cross border traffic; the Mexican peso devaluation of late 1994 and increasingly stringent controls of cross border traffic after the September 11, 2001 attacks were felt strongly in El Paso. In contrast to almost every other border city and popular belief, the commercial traffic at the ports of entry went un-interrupted during the immediate aftermath of 9/11.

Since the 1849 establishment of Fort Bliss in the El Paso area, El Paso has seen many booms in population. More recently, the Base Realignment and Closure (BRAC) commission has marked the base to receive more than 30,000 soldiers, which is estimated to add $547 million to the El Paso economy. The expected 100,000 people destined for El Paso (30,000 soldiers and 70,000 dependents) will bring to El Paso a rise in population that has not been seen since the Mexican Exodus of the 1910s in which the town's population grew by at least 60,000 people that were trying to escape the carnage of the Mexican Revolution.

Recent citywide projects funded through the election of bonds have once again pushed the urban sprawl onward for El Paso. The most prominent of these projects was the complete refurbishment of the Plaza Theatre in Downtown El Paso. The project was completed on March 17, 2006, at a cost of $38 million. With the completion of a new freeway on the city's eastern edge, the city should experience the usual urban sprawl that accompanies such construction. With the arrival of military personnel and expansion of Biggs Army Airfield, the city is also constructing a new "Inner Loop" (Loop 375 to Fred Wilson Avenue) that will connect the eastern section of the city to the Army Airfield. Once completed, Biggs Army Airfield is expected to be larger than the current space at Fort Bliss. Beginning in mid 2008, El Paso's city council decided to reinvest in downtown, with a full redevelopment initiative.

== See also ==
- Timeline of El Paso, Texas
- Timeline of Ciudad Juárez, Mexico
