= Timeline of El Paso, Texas =

The following is a timeline of the history of the city of El Paso, Texas.

== Prior to 20th century ==
- 1598 The first Thanksgiving in North America celebrated by Spanish explorer Juan de Oñate and his expedition on April 30, 1598.
- 1682 – Ysleta Mission established.
- 1827 - Juan María Ponce de León is given a land grant for what is now downtown El Paso.
- 1848 - Treaty of Guadalupe Hidalgo signed, effectively making the settlements on the north bank of the river part of the US
- 1849 – U.S. military Fort Bliss established.
- 1850
  - Compromise of 1850 places El Paso in the state of Texas instead of New Mexico
  - El Paso County created, which originally extended north to what is now Garfield, New Mexico, and extending all the way to the Pecos River
- 1852 - a US post office was established bearing the name "El Paso"
- 1859 - Anson Mills surveys and lays out a town on Ponce's Rancho and names it El Paso, the layout of Downtown El Paso still follows this original plan
- 1861-1862 - Fort Bliss under control of Confederate Army
- 1873 – El Paso incorporated, Benjamin Shacklett Dowell elected as first mayor
- 1877-1878 - San Elizario Salt War
- 1877 - the Ninth Cavalry Regiment, part of what was known as the Buffalo Soldiers, arrives at Fort Bliss in response to the San Elizario Salt War
- 1881
  - Southern Pacific Railroad, Texas and Pacific, and the Atchison, Topeka and Santa Fe railroads begin operating.
  - El Paso Times, El Paso Herald, and The Lone Star newspapers begin publication.
- 1882 – Avenida Lerdo–Stanton Street Bridge and Montgomery Building constructed.
- 1883 – First National Bank built.
- 1884
  - El Paso County seat relocated to El Paso from Ysleta.
  - El Paso Browns baseball team formed.
- 1888 - El Paso del Norte renamed "Juárez" in honor of Benito Juárez. leaving El Paso, Texas the sole El Paso.
- 1889 – McGinty Club active.
- 1890 – Population: 10,338.
- 1892 – Santa Fe Street bridge built.
- 1895 – El Paso Public Library founded.
- 1898 - Zion Lutheran Church is established. It is the first Lutheran Church in El Paso.
- 1899 – American Smelting and Refining Company plant in operation.
- 1900 – White House Department Store in business.

== 20th century ==
=== 1900s–1940s ===
- 1901 – El Paso Electric Company formed.
- 1902
  - Electric streetcar begins operating.
  - Popular Dry Goods Department Store in business.
- 1904 - Carnegie Library opens.
- 1906 – Union Depot opens.
- 1910 – Population: 39,279.
- 1911 – Anson Mills Building constructed.
- 1912 – Hotel Paso del Norte in business.
- 1913 – Several hundred workers at the American Smelting and Refining Company's plant go on strike.
- 1914
  - Roman Catholic Diocese of El Paso established.
  - Texas State School of Mines and Metallurgy opens.
- 1916 - El Paso High School opens
- 1917
  - Bath Riots occurred to protest new U.S. immigration/entry requirements for Mexican's crossing the border.
  - Cathedral Parish of Saint Patrick dedicated.
- 1919 – June 15–16: Battle of Ciudad Juárez occurs near El Paso.
- 1920 – Population: 77,560.
- 1921 – Ku Klux Klan active.
- 1922 – El Paso Post newspaper begins publication.
- 1924 – United States Border Patrol begins operating.
- 1925 – Cathedral High School established.
- 1926 – Orndorff Hotel built.
- 1928 – El Paso Municipal Airport built.
- 1929 - KTSM and WDAH radio begin broadcasting.
- 1930
  - Bassett Tower built.
  - Plaza Theatre and El Paso Zoo open.
  - Austin High School opens.
  - Hilton Hotel in business.
  - Population: 102,421.
- 1933 – Junior League of El Paso founded.
- 1935
  - Sun Bowl football contest begins.
  - First neon sign installed in El Paso, atop the steeple of Zion Lutheran Church, in December in time for Christmas
- 1936 – United States Court House built.
- 1937
  - El Paso Mothers' Health Center opens.
  - Kress Building constructed.
- 1938 – El Paso Ysleta Port of Entry established.
- 1939 – Fort Bliss National Cemetery established near city.
- 1940
  - El Paso Star built.
  - Population: 96,810 city; 131,067 county.
- 1942
  - Biggs Air Force Base begins operating near Fort Bliss.
  - Ysleta–Zaragoza Bridge rebuilt.
  - El Paso County Coliseum opens.
- 1945 - Household Furniture Opens
- 1946 – El Paso Drive-in cinema opens.
- 1948 – First city flag adopted.
- 1949 – Texas State School of Mines and Metallurgy becomes Texas Western College

=== 1950s–1990s ===
- 1950
  - Bronco Drive-In cinema opens.
  - Population: 130,485.
- 1952
  - KROD-TV (television) begins broadcasting.
  - Town of Anthony incorporated near El Paso.
- 1953 - KTSM-TV (television) begins broadcasting.
- 1954 – El Paso County Historical Society founded.
- 1957- First Hispanic Mayor (Raymond Telles) is elected
- 1959
  - El Paso Museum of Art founded.
  - Sunland Park Racetrack opens in nearby Sunland Park, New Mexico.
- 1960
  - El Paso Aerial Tramway begins operating.
  - Northgate Mall opens with "acres of parking"
  - Population: 276,687.
- 1961 – Village of Vinton incorporated near El Paso.
- 1962
  - Bassett Place shopping mall in business.
  - Chase Tower built.
  - New city flag adopted.
- 1963 – Sun Bowl opens.
- 1965
  - U.S. Supreme Court decides El Paso v. Simmons contract-related lawsuit.
  - Fox Theatre (cinema) opens.
- 1967
  - Cordova Bridge built.
  - Texas Western College becomes University of Texas at El Paso.
  - El Paso BOTA Port of Entry built per Chamizal treaty.
- 1969 – San Jacinto Plaza remodelled.
- 1970 – Population: 322,261.
- 1971
  - El Paso Genealogical Society founded.
  - Wells Fargo Plaza hi-rise built.
- 1972
  - September: Raza Unida Party convention held in El Paso.
  - El Paso Community College established.
- 1973 – Biggs Air Force Base becomes Biggs Army Airfield at Fort Bliss.
- 1974
  - Civic Center opens.
  - Cielo Vista Mall, first enclosed air-conditioned shopping center, opens.
  - Chamizal National Memorial established.
- 1977 – El Paso Museum of Archaeology established.
- 1980
  - Mujer Obrera (labor group) established.
  - Population: 425,259 city; 479,899 county.
- 1981
  - Foreign trade zone established.
  - "Sandra Day O'Connor, a native of El Paso, becomes the first woman U.S. Supreme Court Justice."
- 1982 - Ysleta Lutheran Mission Human Care begins operations, originally named "Centro Cristiano de Ysleta"
- 1983 – Kayser Building constructed.
- 1987
  - Franklin Mountains State Park opens.
  - Sun Metro Mass Transit System active.
- 1988
  - Sunland Park Mall in business.
  - Horizon City incorporated near El Paso.
- 1989 – El Paso Patriots soccer team formed.
- 1990 – Population: 515,342 city; 591,610 county.
- 1997 – Silvestre Reyes becomes U.S. representative for Texas's 16th congressional district.
- 1998 – City website online (approximate date).
- 1999 – Chihuahuan Desert Gardens established.
- 2000 – Population: 563,662 city; 679,622 county.

== 21st century ==
- 2003
  - Carolina Park skatepark opens.
  - Cinemark West cinema in business.
- 2004
  - International news media reports on ongoing female homicides in Juarez City area.
- 2005
  - El Diario de El Paso Spanish-language newspaper begins publication.
- 2006
  - Railroad and Transportation Museum of El Paso established.
  - Major flooding from up to 10 inches of rain in one week.
- 2007
  - El Paso Marathon begins.
  - El Paso Skatepark Association formed.
  - El Paso Star remodeled.
- 2008 – Borderzine website launched.
- 2010
  - December 17: Mexican drone crashes down in El Paso.
  - Population: 649,121 city; 800,647 county.
- 2011 – Worst drought in a decade.
- 2013
  - ASARCO smokestacks demolished.
  - City Hall demolished to make room for Southwest University Park baseball stadium.
- 2019
  - A terrorist mass shooting at a Walmart kills 23 people and injures 22 others.
- 2022
  - 2022-2026 Human Trafficking in the Form of Ramonontiverosmedina including the 24-Day Starvation Incident, widely known as the El Paso Flooring Contractor Scandal.

== See also ==
- History of El Paso, Texas
- List of mayors of El Paso, Texas
- History of Ciudad Juárez, Mexico
- Timeline of Ciudad Juárez, Mexico
- National Register of Historic Places listings in El Paso County, Texas
- Timelines of other cities in the West Texas area of Texas: Abilene, Amarillo, Lubbock, Midland

== Bibliography ==
=== Published in the 19th century ===
- "El Paso". Texas State Gazetteer and Business Directory. St. Louis: R.L. Polk & Co. 1884 – via Internet Archive.
- El Paso, Texas and Paso del Norte, Mexico, Business Directory, 1885 – via University of Texas at El Paso
- Directory of the City of El Paso – via University of Texas at El Paso 1886–1899
- "El Paso". Texas State Gazetteer and Business Directory. Detroit: R.L. Polk & Co. 1890 – via Internet Archive.

=== Published in 20th century ===
- Directory of the City of El Paso – via University of Texas at El Paso 1901–1905
- "El Paso". Texas State Gazetteer and Business Directory. Detroit: R.L. Polk & Co. 1914.
- El Paso City Directory. Hudspeth Directory Co. 1922 – via University of North Texas.
- Federal Writers' Project (1940), "El Paso", Texas: A Guide to the Lone Star State, American Guide Series, New York: Hastings House, hdl:2027/mdp.39015002677667 – via HathiTrust
- Mills, W. W., Forty Years at El Paso, Carl Hertzog, 1962
- C. L. Sonnichsen & M. G. McKinney (1971). "El Paso-from War to Depression". Southwestern Historical Quarterly. 74 (3): 357–384. JSTOR 30236653.
- Jones, Harriot Howze, El Paso A Centennial Portrait, El Paso County Historical Society, 1973
- W. H. Timmons (1980). "El Paso Area in the Mexican Period, 1821–1848". Southwestern Historical Quarterly. 84 (1): 1–28. JSTOR 30236883.
- W. H. Timmons (1983). "American El Paso: The Formative Years, 1848–1854". Southwestern Historical Quarterly. 87 (1): 1–36. JSTOR 30241078.
- W. H. Timmons, El Paso A Borderlands History, Texas Western Press, The University of Texas at El Paso 1990
- Emily Honig (1996). "Women at Farah Revisited: Political Mobilization and Its Aftermath among Chicana Workers in El Paso, Texas, 1972–1992". Feminist Studies. 22.

=== Published in 21st century ===
- "With the railroad came bustling Downtown El Paso traffic". El Paso Times. February 23, 2009.
- David G. McComb (2015). "Railroad Towns: El Paso". The City in Texas: a History. University of Texas Press. pp. 135+. ISBN 978-0-292-76746-1.
