= El Paso Chamber of Commerce =

Major city chamber of commerce

The El Paso Chamber (formerly Greater El Paso Chamber of Commerce) is a commercial association in El Paso, Texas. It serves the multiple purpose of charity, education, science, and literature of the city.

== History ==
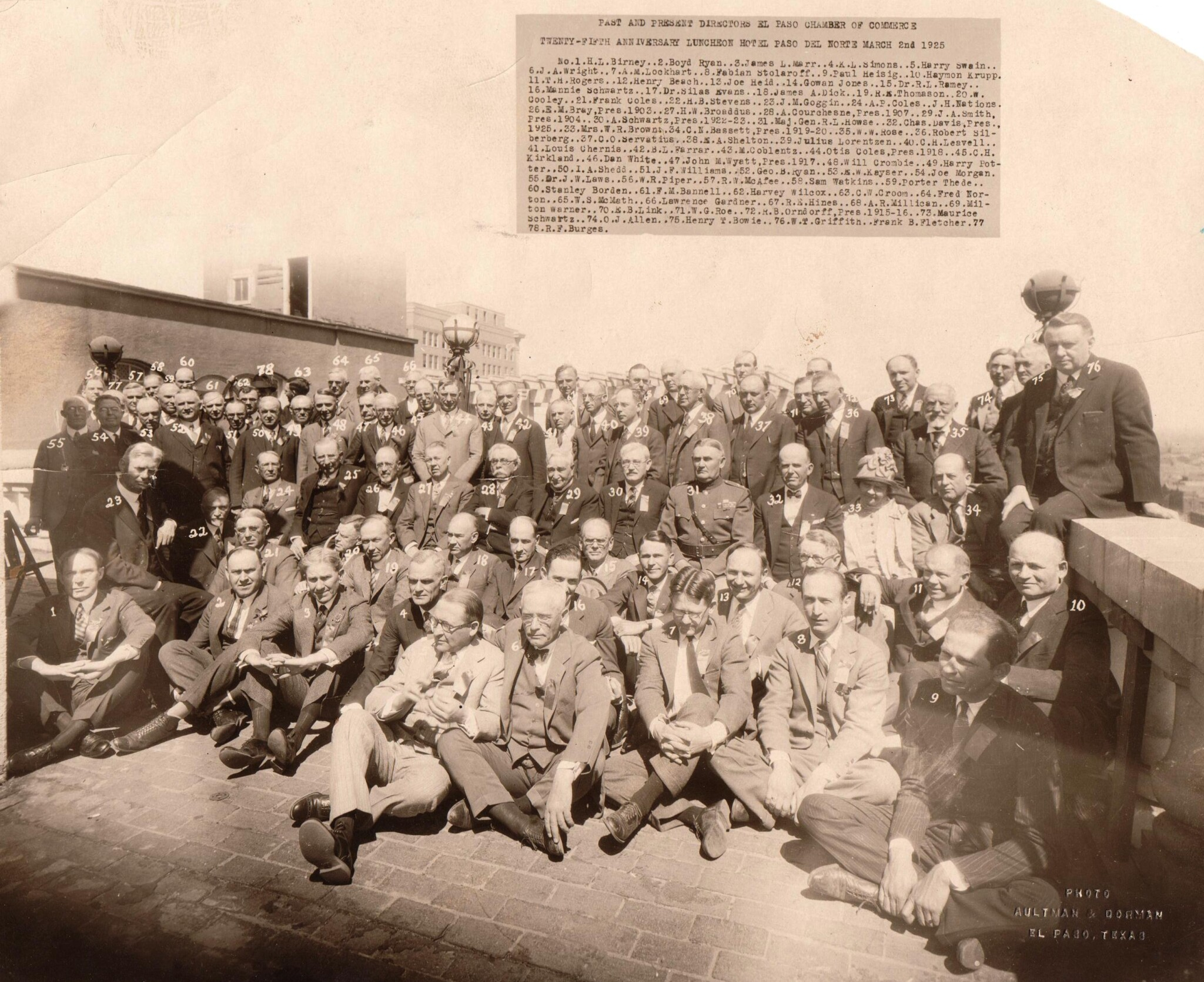
Past and present Directors of the El Paso Chamber of Commerce, 25th anniversary luncheon, Hotel Paso del Norte, El Paso, March 2, 1925

The Chamber evolved serially from predecessor business organizations in the city, starting with the El Paso Board of Trade, founded in February 1883. In August 1889, this organization was replaced by the Merchants and Shippers of El Paso. In the two months following a November 1899 resolution by the members of the Merchants and Shippers, the El Paso Chamber of Commerce was formed and recognized by the State of Texas. In June 1900, the Chamber, which had been meeting in offices of the El Paso County Courthouse, moved into their original headquarters at No. 5 Little Plaza. The Chamber operated at a series of locations from 1900 to May 1909, when they occupied a building proposed and constructed by Frank Powers at 310 San Francisco Avenue.

It was at this location that the Chamber hosted U.S. President William Howard Taft and Mexican President Porfirio Diaz on October 16, 1909. The meeting between the two was held in "an inner room of the Chamber of Commerce Building, ... attended only by Gov. Creel of the State of Chihuahua, former Ambassador to the United States, who acted as interpeter." An hour later, a second meeting between the two heads of state proceeded at Ciudad Juárez. These comprised the first meetings between a United States President and a President of Mexico.

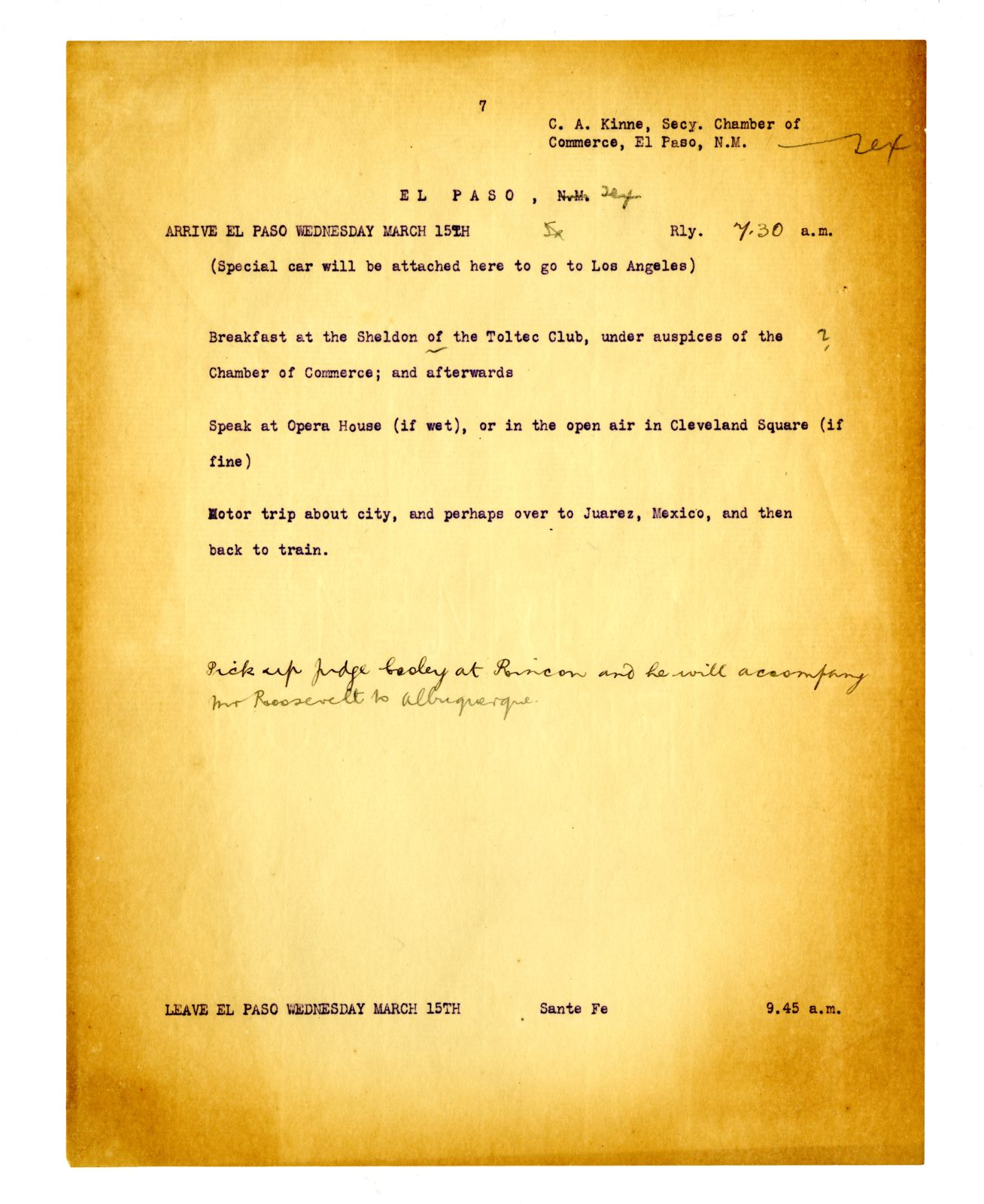
Itinerary of Theodore Roosevelt at El Paso, March 15, 1911; noting "under auspices of the Chamber of Commerce"

This meeting was followed less than two years later by a visit from former President Theodore Roosevelt, also coordinated by the Chamber.

In 1924, the Greater El Paso Chamber of Commerce established the first Women's Department of a chamber of commerce in the United States, organized by May McGhee, a member of the Woman's Club of El Paso. Kate Moore Brown served as the department's first chairman-director. Each year, the department resolved to undertake a civic project. In 1954, the Women's Department of the Chamber gave birth to the El Paso County Historical Society. The Society originated as the department's annual project for that year upon its adoption by department chairman-Director Louise Schuessler on January 19.

The organization was rebranded as the "El Paso Chamber" in 2018.

== Recent activity of the Chamber ==
In February 2023, the Chamber, comprising approximately a thousand commercial members, signed an agreement of mutual support and collaboration with The National Chamber of the Processing Industry (Canacintra), Juárez. In October 2024, the Chamber filed a statistical report with Governor of Texas, the Federal Highway Administration, the Texas Department of Transportation (TxDOT), and the Texas Transportation Commission, purporting to show a shortfall in highway fund revenues to the El Paso District of TxDOT.

== Facilities ==
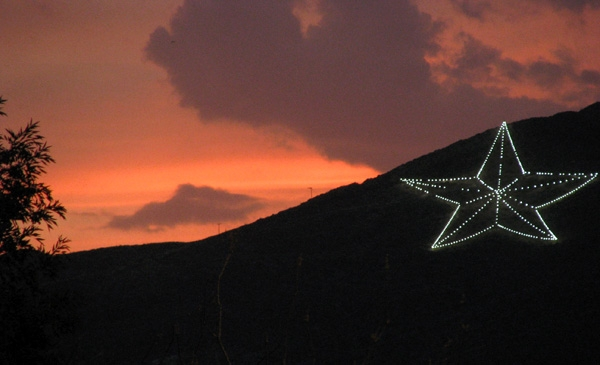
The Star on the Mountain south of Comanche Peak in the Franklin Mountains is operated by the El Paso Chamber.

As of 2024, the Chamber was meeting in offices at 303 North Oregon Street. Besides their advocacy work, the Chamber operates the Star on the Mountain, a distinctive illuminated landmark of the city of El Paso. With effect from January 26, 1999, the Chamber co-leased with the United States General Services Administration a designated commuter lane on the U.S. side of the international Stanton Street Bridge connecting El Paso to Ciudad Juárez. The lease remained current as of August 24, 2022.

== See also ==
- Chamber of commerce
- History of El Paso, Texas
- Timeline of El Paso, Texas
