= Timeline of Ciudad Juárez =

The following is a timeline of the history of the city of Ciudad Juárez, Chihuahua, Mexico.

== Prior to 20th century ==
- 1659 — Mission de Nuestra Señora de Guadalupe founded.
- 1681/2 — Town founded.
- 1682 – Ysleta Mission established.
- 1826 — Town named "Villa Paso del Norte."
- 1846
  - The Mexican–American War begins
  - The Battle of El Bracito is fought nearby on 25 December
- 1848 – Across the Rio Grande, El Paso becomes part of the U.S. state of Texas per Treaty of Guadalupe Hidalgo.
- 1865 — HQ of Benito Juárez the 26th president of Mexico, 1858–1872.
- 1884 — Mexican Central Railway opened, linking Mexico City to Ciudad Juárez.
- 1888
  - El Paso del Norte renamed "Juárez" in honor of Benito Juárez.
  - Customs Office building constructed.
- 1895 — Population: 6,917.

== 20th century ==
- 1906 - Escuela Superior de Agricultura "Hermanos Escobar" (school) founded.

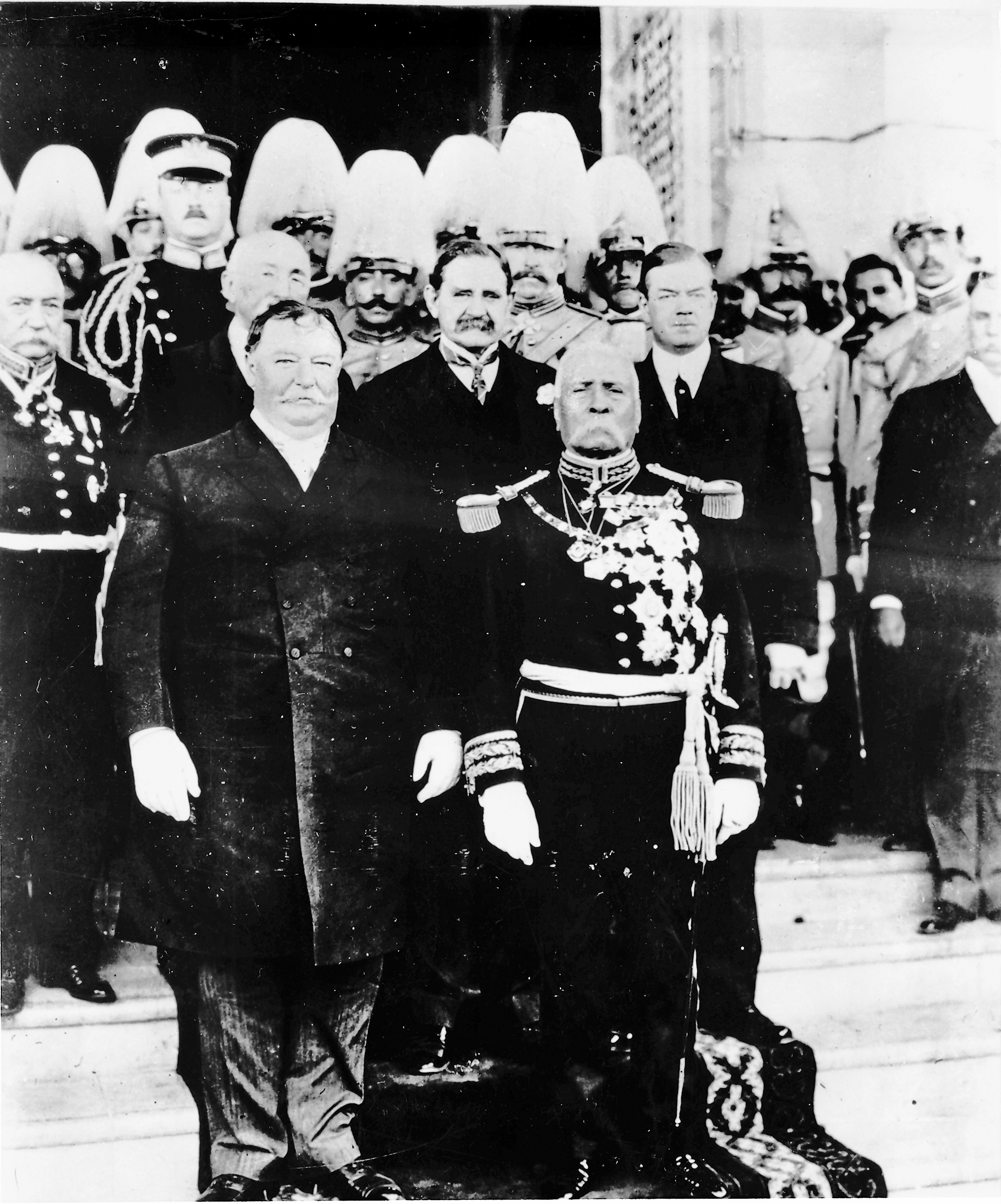
Howard Taft and Porfirio Díaz, historic first presidential summit, Ciudad Juárez, Mexico, 1909

- 1909 - William Howard Taft - Porfirio Díaz, historic first Presidential summit and the near assassination of both Presidents.
- 1910 - Biblioteca Municipal (library) established.
- 1911
  - April–May: Battle of Ciudad Juárez (1911); city taken by revolutionaries.
  - World's "first" aerial reconnaissance flown via airplane (El Paso-Ciudad Juarez), for Mexican government.
- 1912 - Mexico North Western Railway (Ciudad Juárez and Chihuahua) in operation.
- 1913 - Battle of Ciudad Juárez (1913).
- 1919 - Battle of Ciudad Juárez (1919).
- 1922 - Teatro-Cine Alcazar (theatre) opens.
- 1930 - Quevedo crime gang active.
- 1933 - Cervecería Cruz Blanca (brewery) established.
- 1938 – El Paso Ysleta Port of Entry, USA, established.
- 1940
  - Teófilo Borunda becomes mayor.
  - Population: 48,881.
  - Following the 1940 Sun Bowl, the local Knights of Columbus in El Paso took the Catholic University Cardinals over the border for lunch in the "squalid but colorful Mexican town" of Ciudad Juárez.
- 1942 - Ysleta–Zaragoza Bridge rebuilt.
- 1943 - El Fronterizo newspaper begins publication.
- 1946 - Cámara Nacional de la Industria de Transformación de Ciudad Juárez, CANACINTRA established*
- 1947 - A modified V2-rocket launched from White Sands crashed south of Tepeyac Cemetery. Although it caused a big crater no people were killed and only minor damages on buildings occurred .
- 1947 - Cine Plaza (cinema) opens.
- 1950 - Population: 122,598.
- 1957 - Roman Catholic Diocese of Ciudad Juárez established.
- 1958 - Cathedral of Ciudad Juárez established.
- 1964 - Instituto Tecnológico de Ciudad Juárez established.
- 1967
  - Paso del Norte International Bridge built.
  - U.S.-Mexico Chamizal land dispute resolved.
- 1968 - RCA Corporation maquila begins operating.
- 1970 - Parque Público Federal El Chamizal (park) created.
- 1973 - Universidad Autónoma de Ciudad Juárez established.
- 1974 - Asociacion de Maquiladoras (labor group) founded.
- 1976 - El Diario de Juárez newspaper in publication.
- 1980
  - XHIJ-TV begins broadcasting.
  - Grupo Intermedia television company established.
  - Population: 567,365 municipality.
- 1981 - Estadio Olímpico Benito Juárez (stadium) opens.
- 1982 - Nipona maquila begins operating.
- 1983 - El Colegio de la Frontera Norte (institute) regional headquarters established.
- 1988 - Club de Fútbol Cobras (football club) active.
- 1990
  - Norte newspaper in publication.
  - Museo Histórico de Ciudad Juárez opens.
  - Population: 798,499 municipality.
- 1995 - Population: 1,011,786 municipality.
- 1998 - Bridge of the Americas (El Paso–Ciudad Juárez) opened.
- 2000
  - XHEM-FM radio begins broadcasting.
  - Mormon temple built.
  - Museo de la Lealtad Republicana (museum) opens.

== 21st century ==
- 2001 - Astros de Ciudad Juárez football club formed.
- 2003 - Frontera Women's Foundation established.
- 2004
  - Museo del Concorde opens.
  - International news media reports on ongoing Female homicides in Ciudad Juárez area.
  - Héctor ¨Teto¨ Murguía Lardizábal becomes mayor of Juárez Municipality.
- 2005 - Indios de Ciudad Juárez (football club) formed.
- 2007 - José Reyes Ferriz becomes mayor of Juárez Municipality.
- 2008 - Juárez Hoy newspaper begins publication.
- 2009
  - March: "Warfare erupts between rival drug gangs."
  - 2 September: Ciudad Juárez rehab center attack.
- 2010
  - 31 January: Villas de Salvárcar massacre.
  - Héctor ¨Teto¨ Murguía Lardizábal becomes mayor of Juárez Municipality again.
  - Population: 1,321,004 city; 1,332,131 municipality.
- 2013
  - ViveBús begins operating.
  - Monumento a la Mexicanidad installed.
  - Enrique Serrano Escobar becomes mayor of Juárez Municipality.
- 2014 - Railroad hub opens in nearby Santa Teresa, New Mexico, USA.
- 2016 - Pope Francis visits Ciudad Juárez in February.

== See also ==
- Ciudad Juárez history
- List of municipal presidents of Juárez
- Chihuahua (state) history
  - History of Chihuahua state (in Spanish)
- Timeline of El Paso, Texas, USA

== Bibliography ==
=== In English ===
- El Paso, Texas and Paso del Norte, Mexico, Business Directory, 1885 – via University of Texas at El Paso
- "Ciudad Juarez" . Encyclopædia Britannica. Vol. 6 (11th ed.). 1910. p. 401.
- Daniel D. Arreola; James R. Curtis (1994). The Mexican Border Cities: Landscape Anatomy and Place Personality. University of Arizona Press. ISBN 978-0-8165-1441-0.
- Nicole Mottier (2009). "Drug Gangs and Politics in Ciudad Juárez: 1928–1936". Mexican Studies. 25.
- Kathleen Staudt; et al., eds. (2010). Cities and Citizenship at the U.S.-Mexico Border: The Paso Del Norte Metropolitan Region. Palgrave Macmillan. ISBN 978-0-230-11291-9.

=== In Spanish ===
- J. Figueroa Doménech (1899). "Estado de Chihuahua: Ciudad Juarez". Guía General Descriptiva de la República Mexicana (in Spanish). Vol. 2. R. de S. N. Araluce. hdl:2027/mdp.39015051117227 – via HathiTrust.
