= Florida J. Wolfe =

African-American socialite and philanthropist

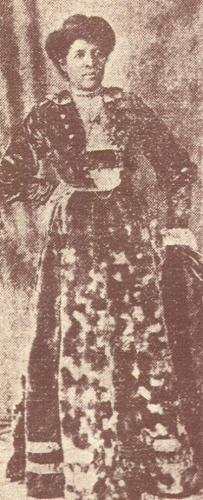
Florida J. Wolfe.

Florida J. Wolfe (c.1867 – May 20, 1913), also known as "Lady Flo", was an African-American socialite, cattle rancher and philanthropist in El Paso, Texas, and Ciudad Juárez.

== Biography ==
Wolfe was born in Illinois around 1867. Wolfe may have arrived in El Paso in 1882 along with Henry O. Flipper. She was fluent in Spanish.

Wolfe was responsible for helping her common-law husband, Irish Lord Delaval James Beresford, regain his lost fortune and help build up his cattle ranches in Juarez. They met while she was working as a nurse in the American consul in Mexico. Their relationship was less of a problem in Mexico than it was in Texas. It was illegal at the time for interracial couples to marry or live together. The couple would go to El Paso to give parties and donated money to the El Paso Fire and Police departments. In 1899, Wolfe was listed as Bereford's housekeeper at their home in El Paso.

In December 1906, Beresford died in a train wreck in Minnesota and Wolfe inherited his property. Beresford's family contested the will, leading to a long court battle. In 1911, she filed a suit over the title of a tract of land in El Paso. At the end of the court battles, she received $15,000 and a few hundred cattle.

Wolfe lived in El Paso at 417 South Ochoa Street in downtown El Paso towards the end of her life. She attended church regularly at the Second Baptist Church. She died in El Paso on May 20, 1913, after she contracted tuberculosis. Her real estate property was appraised at $5,150 and her personal items were worth $120.65 at the time of her death. She is buried in the Concordia Cemetery. People visiting the cemetery claim to see her moving across the grounds in a white dress.
