= Concordia Cemetery (El Paso, Texas) =

Cemetery in El Paso County, Texas

Coordinates: 31°46′49″N 106°26′48″W

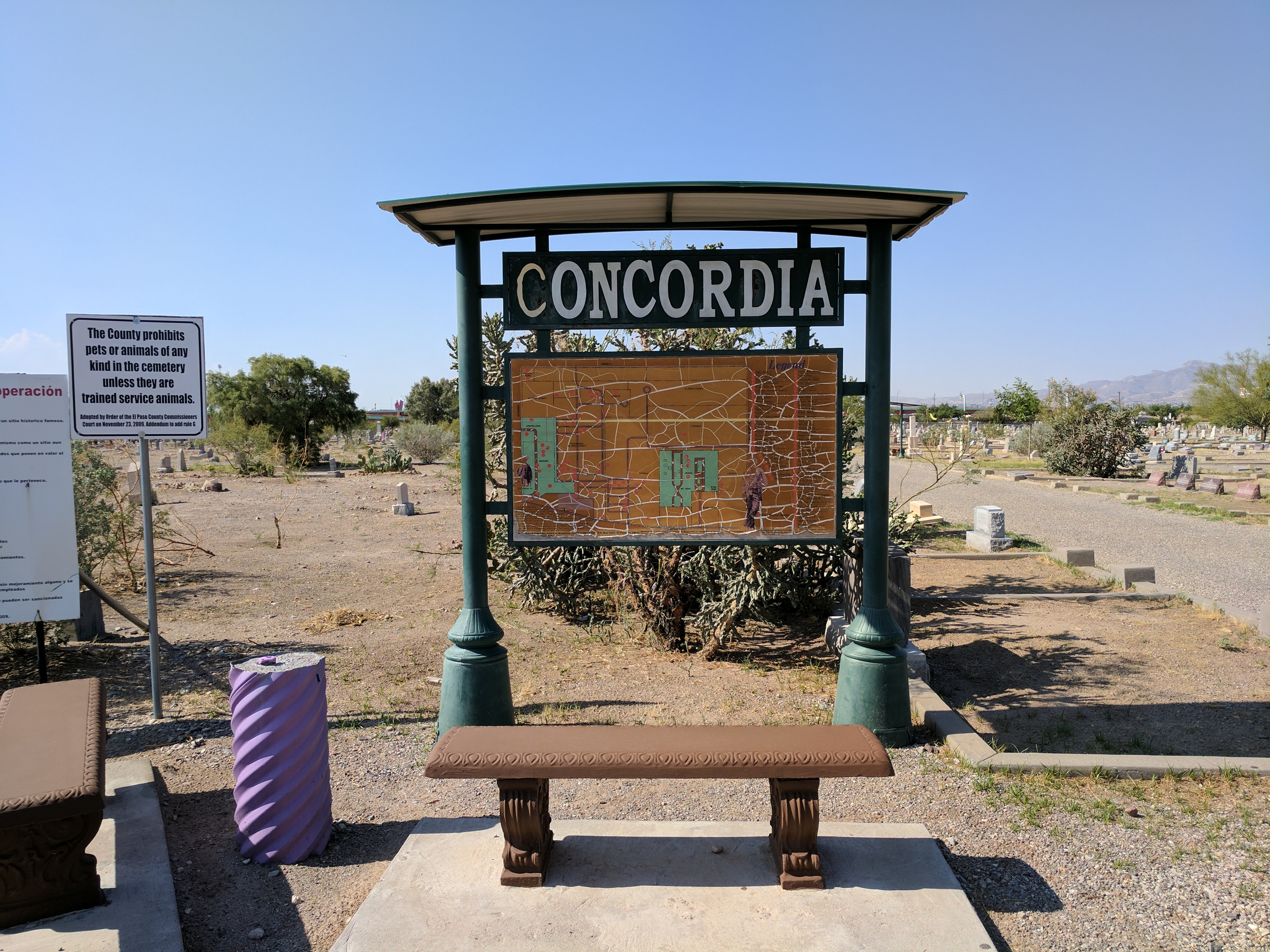
- Map and sign at Concordia Cemetery, El Paso, Texas.
- Interactive map of Concordia Cemetery

Details
- Established: 1856
- Location: Yandell, El Paso, Texas
- No. of graves: Over 60,000

Concordia Cemetery is a burial ground in El Paso, Texas. It is known for the being the burial place of several gunslingers and old west lawmen. The first burial took place in 1856. There are between 60,000 and 65,000 graves in the cemetery. Concordia is the only place to have a Chinese cemetery in Texas.

== About ==
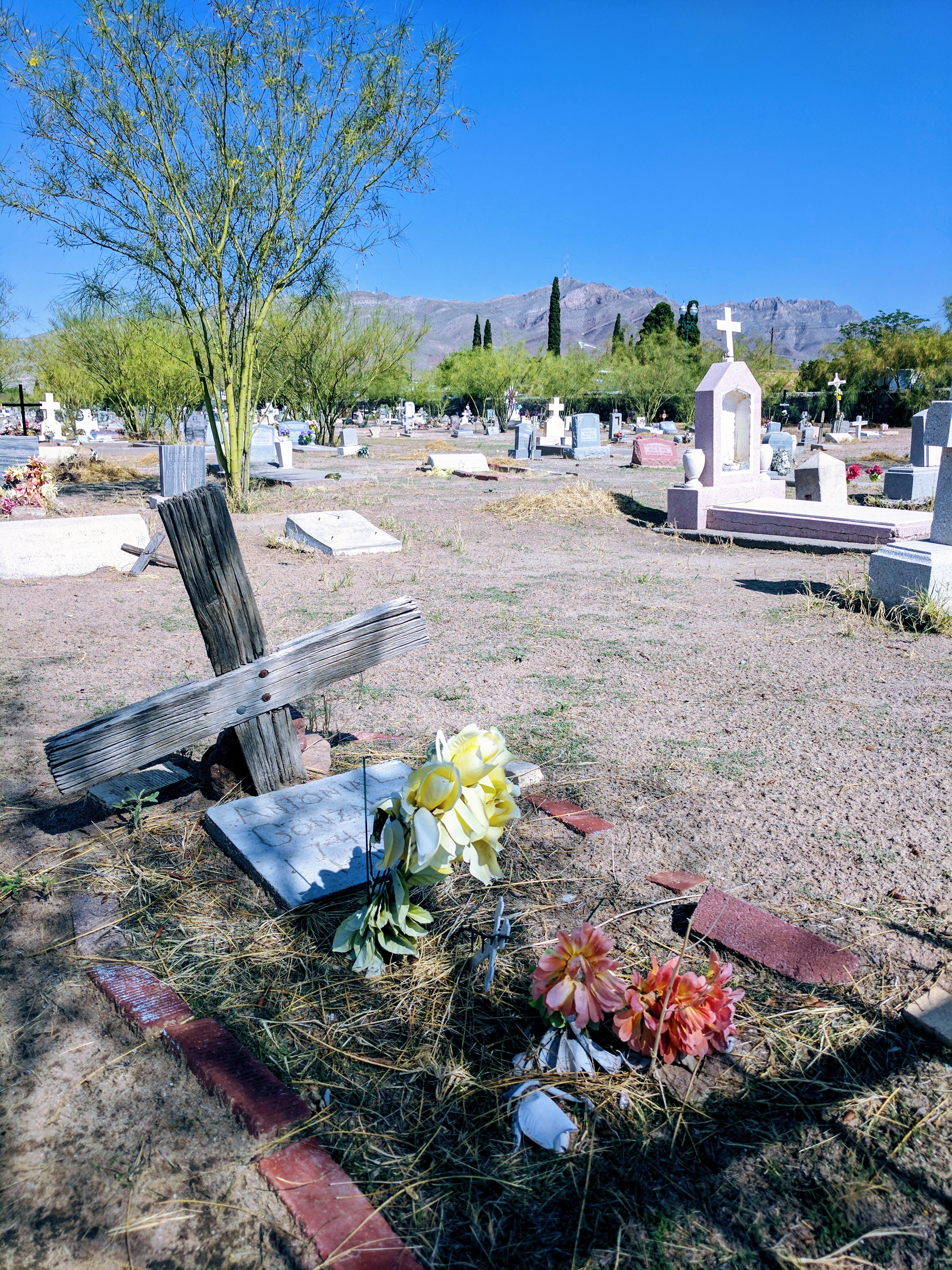
Homemade cross and gravestone at Concordia Cemetery, El Paso.

The main entrance to the cemetery is on Yandell Street, east of Piedras. The cemetery is 52 acres in size. Most of the Chinese burials in El Paso took place in Concordia and it is the only place in Texas to have a Chinese cemetery. The Chinese came to El Paso with the railroad as workers and chose to stay. There are also areas set aside for Buffalo Soldiers, Freemasons, Mormons and Jewish burials. There is also an "infant nursery" with unmarked graves for babies, many of whom died due to the 1918 influenza pandemic which hit El Paso in January 1919. It is possible that remains that were once part of the larger area of the cemetery are still located under houses and other property in the surrounding neighborhoods. In 2012, there were more than 60,000 graves at the cemetery. Other reports state there are around 65,000 graves.

In 2016 and 2017, it was rated the Best Historic Cemetery in the West by True West Magazine. The cemetery is managed by the Concordia Heritage Association. Special events at the cemetery include celebrations of Dia de los Muertos, ghost tours and meetings of the John Wesley Hardin Secret Society. The ghost tours, given by Paso Del Norte Paranormal Society, were first started in order to help pay for maintenance of the cemetery. Ghost Adventures featured the cemetery on an episode aired on October 29, 2016.

== History ==
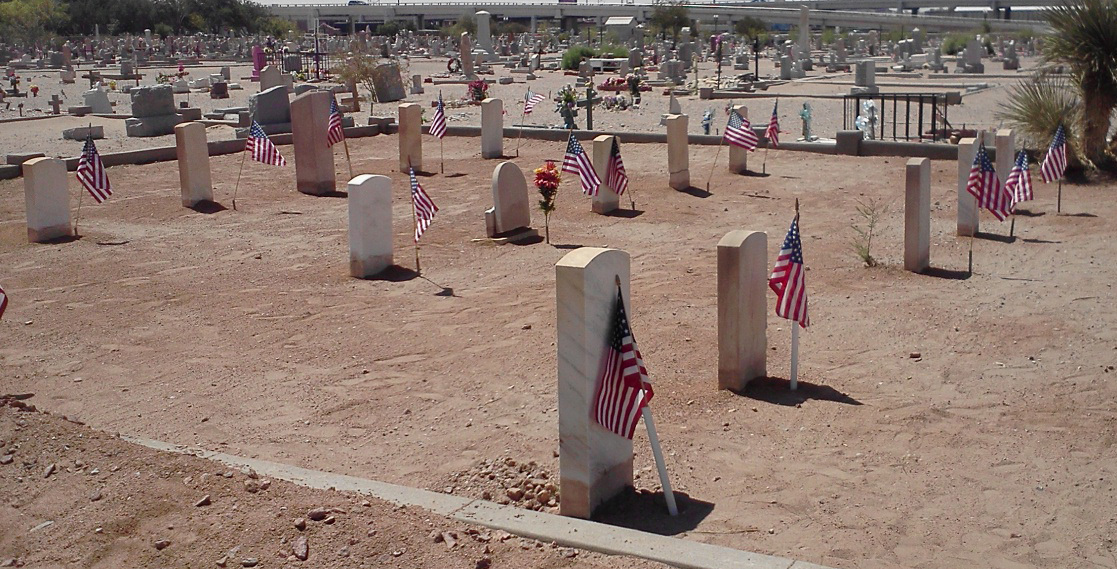
The Grand Republic of the Army area, located in the veteran's section of the graveyard, was decorated with flags to honor the veterans buried there.

The cemetery was once a ranch known as Rancho Concordia, and built by Hugh and Juana Stephenson in the 1840s. Hugh Stephenson married the local Juana Maria Ascarate, and her family gave them the land where they built the ranch. The ranch they built included a chapel and a cemetery. Juana became the first person buried in that cemetery in 1856, after she was gored by a pet deer and died of an infection. Also in 1859, a Catholic Church was built on the site called San José de Concordia el Alto.

In 1882, the city of El Paso bought part of the ranch in order to bury the poor. The different sections of the cemetery were purchased by diverse groups of people by the 1890s, including Jesuits, Catholics, Freemasons, Jewish people, African Americans, Chinese, military, the city and El Paso County. Because of this, no one took responsibility for the upkeep of the cemetery as a whole. In the 1960s, the cemetery was not in good shape and was owned by both private and public interests. In 1990, the Concordia Heritage Association was formed to preserve and maintain the cemetery. In 2012, the Ysleta Lions Club, the Five Points Lions Club and Martin Funeral Homes donated 250 desert willows to the cemetery and helped plant the trees.

== Notable burials ==
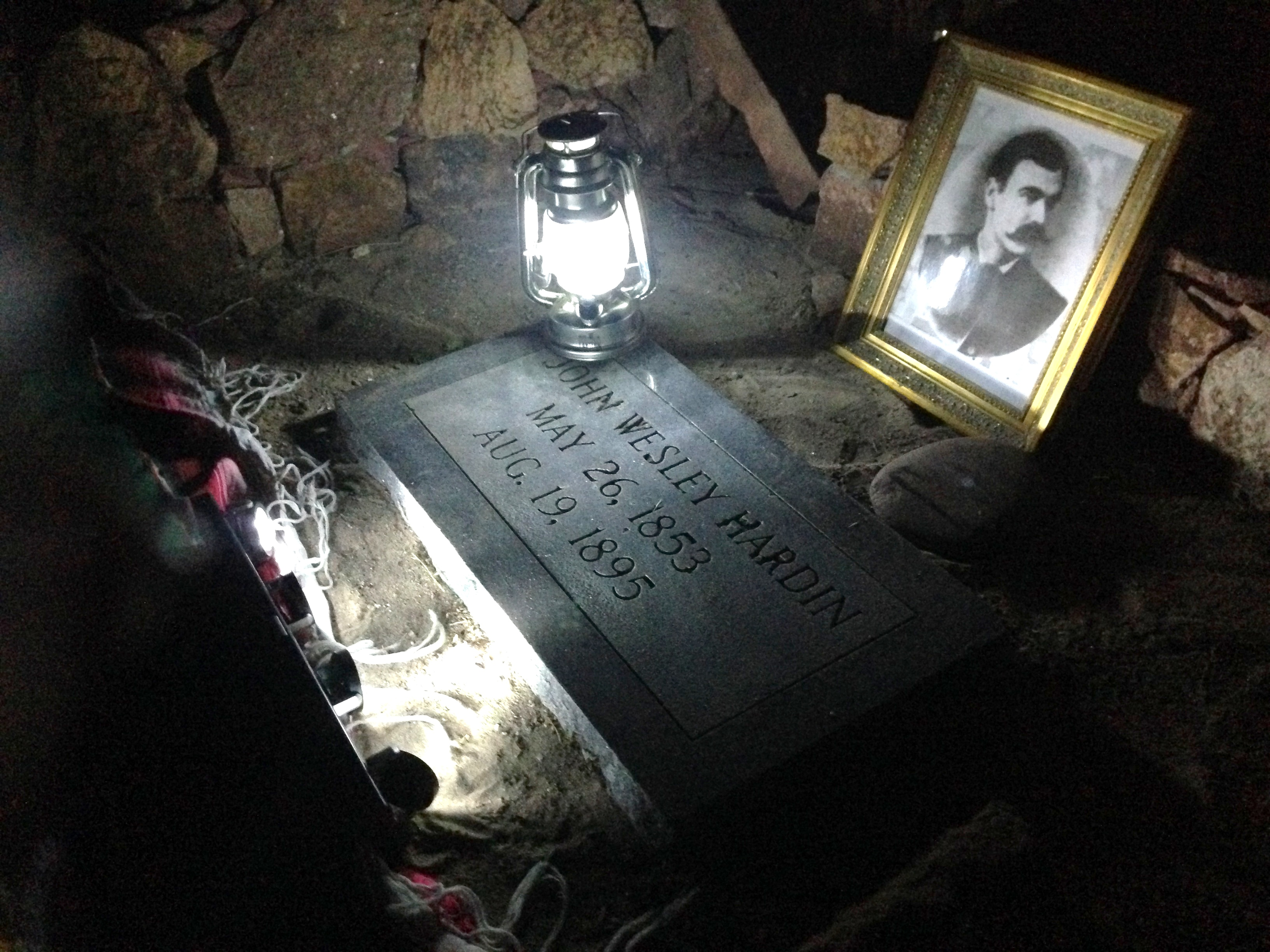
John Wesley Hardin's grave on Day of the Dead in 2013.

- James Biggs (1897―1918), who Biggs Army Airfield is named after.
- Moses Carson (1792―1868), younger brother of Kit Carson.
- Ben Dowell (1818―1880), first mayor of El Paso.
- John Wesley Hardin (1853―1895), gunslinger. His grave is surrounded by a cage to prevent people from digging up his body. In 1995, the descendants of Hardin requested permission to move his remains to Nixon, Texas, but a judge decided his body should stay in El Paso.
- Pascual Orozco (1882―1915), Mexican Revolution leader briefly buried in Concordia between 1915 and 1923; his remains were moved to Chihuahua.
- John Selman (1839―1896), gunslinger, killer of Hardin.
- Ernest St. Leon (d. 1898), Texas ranger.
- Florida J. Wolfe (c. 1867―1913), also known as "Lady Flo"
