= Ben Dowell =

American soldier and politician

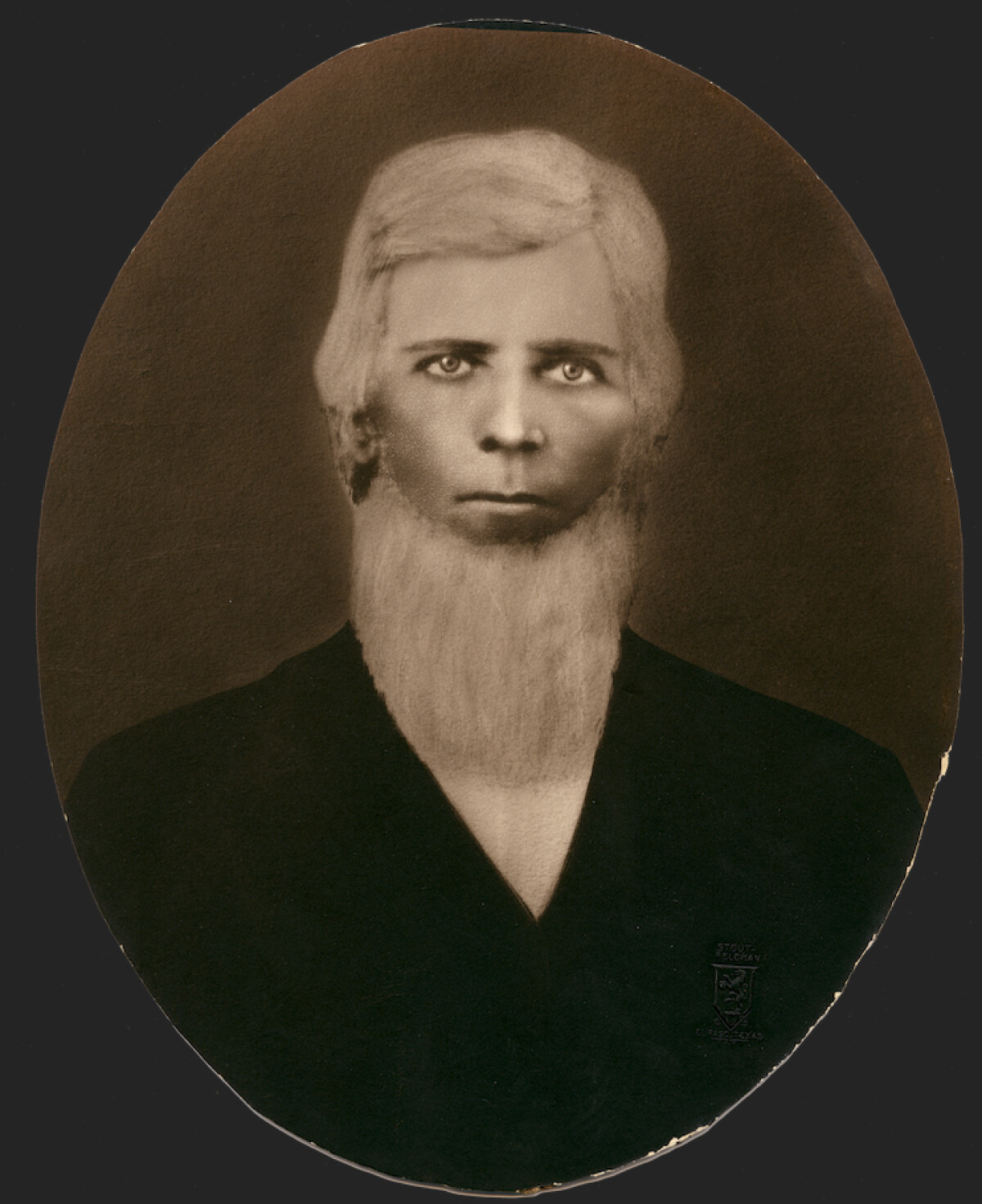
- The only surviving portrait of Dowell, discovered in 2016.

1st Mayor of El Paso
- In office August 12, 1873 – 1875
- Preceded by: seat established
- Succeeded by: Melton A. Jones

Personal details
- Born: Benjamin Shacklett Dowell; November 30, 1818 possibly Frankfort, Kentucky, U.S.
- Died: November 8, 1880 (aged 61) El Paso, Texas, U.S.
- Resting place: Concordia Cemetery, El Paso, Texas
- Party: Democratic

Military service
- Allegiance: United States, later Confederate States of America
- Branch/service: US Army, later Confederate Army
- Years of service: 1846–1848; 1861–?
- Rank: Private, later Captain
- Unit: First Regiment Kentucky Mounted Volunteers, later possibly 2nd and/or 5th Texas Cavalry Regiment's

Benjamin Shacklett Dowell (November 30, 1818 – November 8, 1880) was an American soldier and politician who served as the first mayor of El Paso, Texas.

== Biography ==
Little is known about the early life of Ben Dowell, but it is known that he was a native of Kentucky. He was born on November 30, 1818 to the War of 1812 veteran and Colonel James Dowell and his wife Barbara Dowell, possibly in or near Frankfort. It is known that he had nine siblings by 1833, five sisters and four brothers. He served as a part of the First Regiment Kentucky Mounted Volunteers during the Mexican–American War under Colonel Humphrey Marshall. In 1847, Ben and 100 men were captured near the Encarnación Ranch shortly before the Battle of Buena Vista. When he was released in 1849, he was granted the ownership of 160 acres of land for his service. It is said that his hair had turned entirely gray during his time as a POW in Mexico City, despite only being 31 years old. His home was located near modern-day Downtown El Paso. There he would meet Juana Marquez, a native Tigua in Ysleta. He would marry her in 1852, and many sources state it was when she was only 19 and Ben was 34. Although this is questionable, as census records state that Ben was closer to 39. For a year, the couple moved to Los Angeles, California in search of business ventures, and there they would have their first child before returning to El Paso. They would go on to have five children between 1854 and 1875. Ben would serve as the second postmaster of El Paso from 1857 through 1860, just after William M. Jenkins.

It is said that during the Civil War Ben served as a Confederate Army captain in San Antonio and Galveston, where he worked as a recruiter. Likely within cavalry units due to his experience as a war veteran. He is also considered to be the first person to ever fly a confederate flag in El Paso. However there are very few records to support these claims. Ben likely lost his position not long after El Paso and the surrounding area were captured by the California Column in August, 1862. It is known that his former Colonel Humphrey Marshall, now a Brigadier General for the Confederacy, fled to Texas following the end of the war. It is unknown if the two ever crossed paths.

In the years to come, El Paso saw a growth in population and trade. On May 17, 1873, El Paso was incorporated by the state of Texas, and soon after, elections were held on August 12. This resulted in Ben becoming the city's first mayor. It is said that the rebel group had attempted to take over the city in September 1875, but Ben, who was also serving as the city's Marshall, quickly put that down. The very next year we know from Pat Garrett's biography that Billy the Kid had made a stop at Ben's saloon. He lost his reelection bid and would briefly serve as an alderman in 1880.

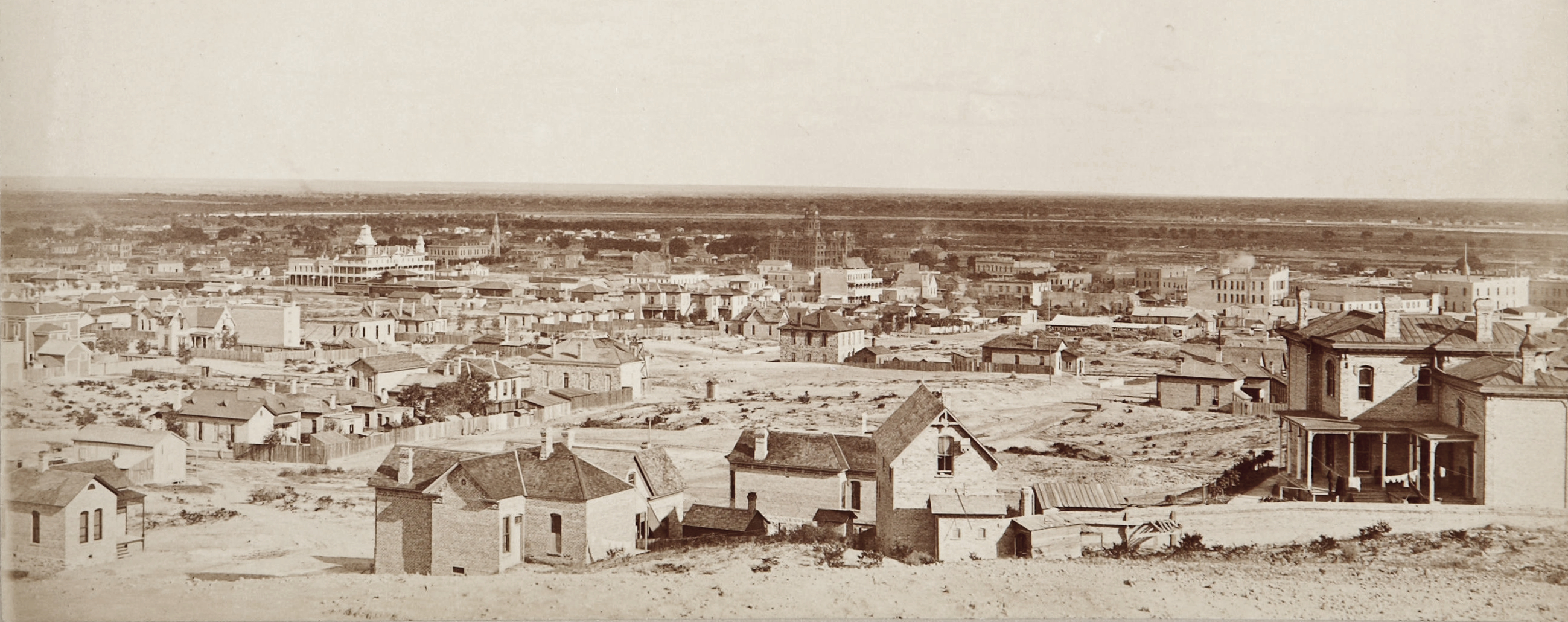
El Paso c. 1880

Ben died in his home on November 8, 1880, aged 61, with the most popular cause being from pneumonia. He was originally buried in the Masonic Cemetery in Las Cruces, New Mexico Territory roughly 40 miles away from his home. His remains would be moved back to El Paso and interred in the Concordia Cemetery in 1881.

== Legacy ==
Ben's wife, Juana Dowell, died sometime in the year 1891; the exact date and cause are unknown. According to census records, she was 58 years old. Despite Ben and Juana having five children, the burial sites of only two are known: their first child, Mary, and one son named John.

Ben S. Dowell Elementary School was opened in the Milagro Hills neighborhood of El Paso in 1959. It was shut down and dismantled by 2022 and was replaced by Coach Archie Duran Elementary.
