= Star on the Mountain =

Man-made illuminated structure in El Paso, Texas

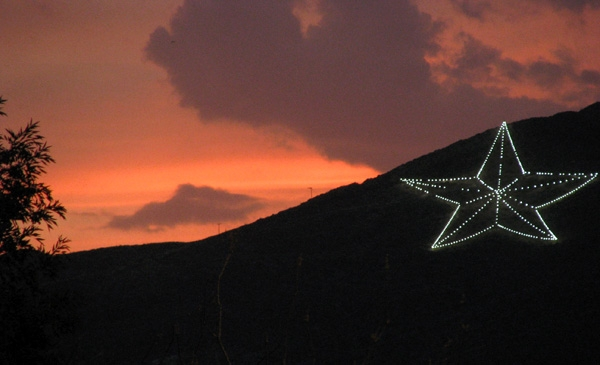
- The El Paso Star illuminated at sunset in 2012
- Interactive map of Star on the Mountain
- Location: El Paso, Texas, U.S.
- Coordinates: around 31°47′10″N 106°28′44″W
- Inauguration date: November 29, 1940; 85 years ago

The Star on the Mountain is a man-made star-shaped landmark on the Franklin Mountains in El Paso, Texas, that is illuminated nightly by the El Paso Chamber. It was first lit as a Christmas decoration in 1940 and was meant as a reminder to people on both sides of the nearby Mexico–United States border that America was at peace during the holiday season. It has also been compared to the similar Roanoke Star in Virginia.

The five-point star consists of 459 bulbs and is visible from the air at up to 100 miles (160 km) away. It was previously only lit during the holiday season but is now maintained year-round by the El Paso Chamber and the El Paso Electric Company.

== Measurements ==
The El Paso Star is 459 feet (140 m) tall and 278 feet (85 m) wide. It is made up of 459 bulbs arranged on the Franklin Mountains at a 30-degree angle. The poles supporting it range from 12 to 15 feet (3.7 to 4.6 m) tall.

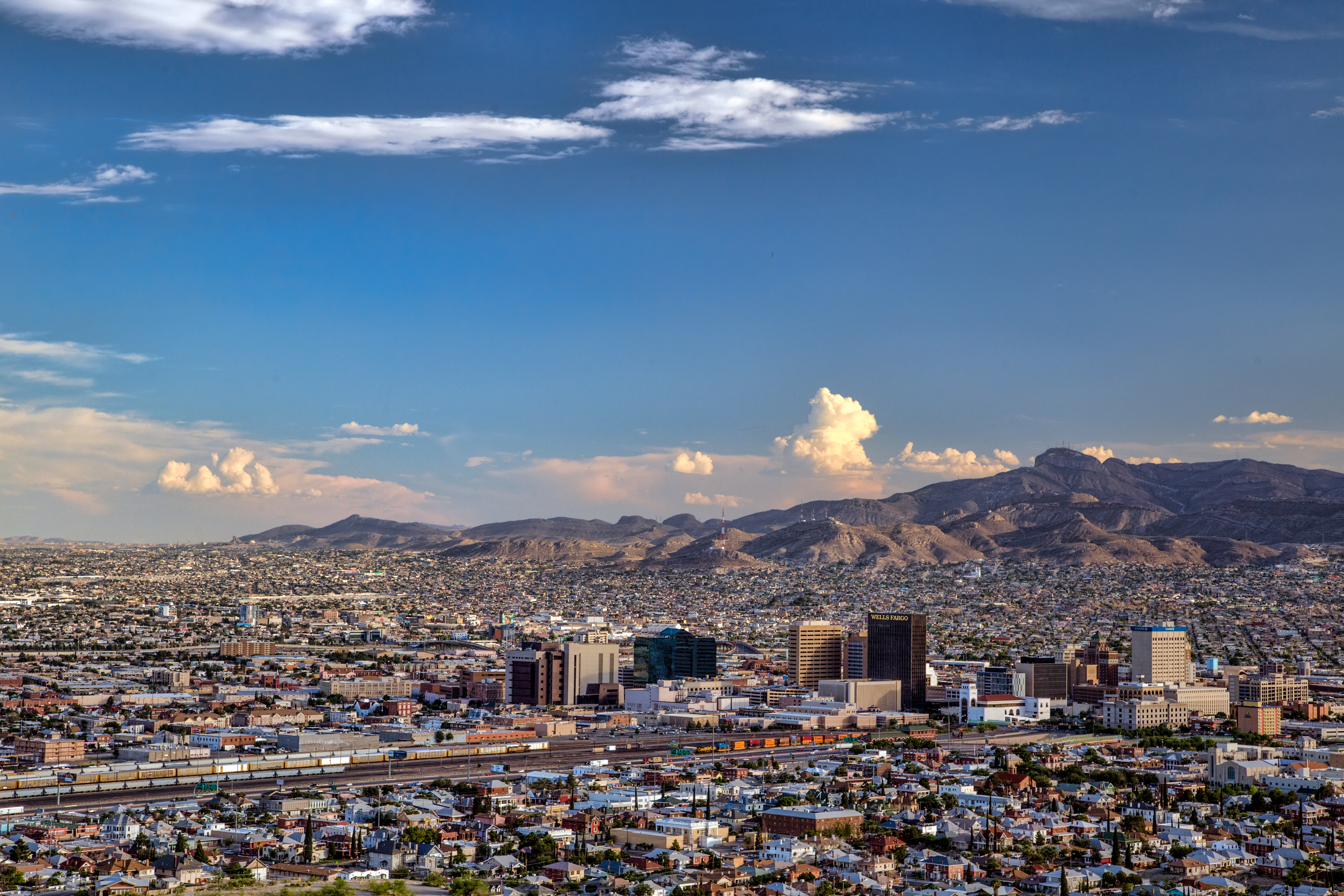
El Paso, shown from Scenic Drive

The star is located south of Comanche Peak, about 300 feet (91 m) above Scenic Drive, a prominent El Paso location for taking photos of the cityscape. It is visible from the air at up to 100 miles (160 km) away and from the ground at up to 25–35 miles (40–56 km) away.

The star was estimated to cost about $8 per night to light in 1981 and $16 per night in 1992, which was paid for by El Paso Electric customers through a fee added to electric bills.

== History ==
=== 20th century ===
The star was first lit on November 29, 1940, at 6:10 p.m. with over 300 blue lamps. It was constructed by the El Paso Electric Company, which hoped that the star would "contribute something toward the festive appearance of [the] city during the holiday season." The original star was only 50 feet wide.

Shortly after, a bigger and more durable star was built, measuring 403 by 300 feet (123 by 91 m) and using 300 lights.

In 1941, 50 more bulbs were added to fill in dim spots. The star was later reconstructed in December 1946 after being destroyed by a storm and was visible by air from up to 100 miles (160 km) away. This version of the star was constructed with 459 150-watt lamps and was 459 by 278 feet (140 by 85 m). Its length is greater than its width to allow for the distortion caused by viewing it from the ground. This star has also been compared to the similar Roanoke Star in Roanoke, Virginia.

For almost 50 years, the star only shone for the holiday season, with two exceptions. Starting in 1979, the star was lit for 444 nights to support U.S. hostages during the Iran hostage crisis. After the hostages were released, the star returned to its normal holiday schedule. It also shined every night from December 1990 until August 21, 1991, the day when the last soldier from Fort Bliss returned from the Gulf War. There are no clear records indicating that the star has been lit every year since 1940. It may or may not have been lit during World War II, but many agree that it has been lit every holiday season since then.

As part of an international Earth Run for UNICEF, on December 14, 1986, Tanzanian athlete Suleiman Nyambui passed a flame to El Paso Electric Company president Evern Wall, who dipped it into a ceremonial vessel at 6 p.m. and lit the star at the same time.

In November 1993, a joint project between the Greater El Paso Chamber of Commerce and the El Paso Electric Company led to the star being lit nightly, although many residents of El Paso were originally against the idea. The project also allows individuals to sponsor a lighting of the star in honor of a loved one or a special occasion.

=== 21st century ===
$32,000 was spent to remodel the star in 2007, including installing new wiring and lighting fixtures, more reliable bulbs, and a radio frequency system to allow remote control of the star from a computer or cell phone. This allowed easy control of the star without requiring a crew to physically visit it on the mountain.

The city government took ownership of the star in 2009 after the city council voted to accept the Chamber of Commerce's donation of the equipment and logo. In 2010, the city council approved a 50-year lease with 88 Investments Inc., the company that owns the land that the star resides on. Rather than paying rent, the city would pay taxes of about $1,200 per year on the land.

In October 2021, the star was bright red to celebrate several public safety campaigns, including Fire Prevention Week, National Domestic Violence Awareness Month, and Red Ribbon Week.

In September 2023, the El Paso Chamber began a $300,000 project to replace the star's bulbs with bulbs made by New York company CodeLumen that can be controlled individually using a computer and are brighter, energy-efficient, and shatter-proof. They sold the old bulbs for $1,000 each to fund this renovation.

The star was lit up orange on April 17, 2024, to commemorate National Work Zone Awareness Week.

In June 2024, the star was rainbow-colored to celebrate Pride Month. August

In August 2025, the star flashed 23 times to represent and honor the 23 lives lost during the El Paso Walmart mass shooting hate crime attack that occurred on August 3, 2019.

== Vandalism ==
The star is frequently vandalized by trespassers, and officials say that vandalism has been constant for as long as the star has existed. The Chamber of Commerce has constantly asked the local community to avoid trespassing and vandalizing this symbol of El Paso, also noting that the area is monitored by cameras and the El Paso Police Department.

Vandalism of the star typically consists of breaking light bulbs and discarding empty beer bottles at the site and has been known to result in criminal citations from El Paso police. Some vandals also steal light bulbs from the property.

== See also ==
- Palmer Lake Star
- Light pollution
