= Ysleta–Zaragoza International Bridge =

U.S.-Mexican border crossing in El Paso, Texas and Ciudad Juárez, Chihuahua

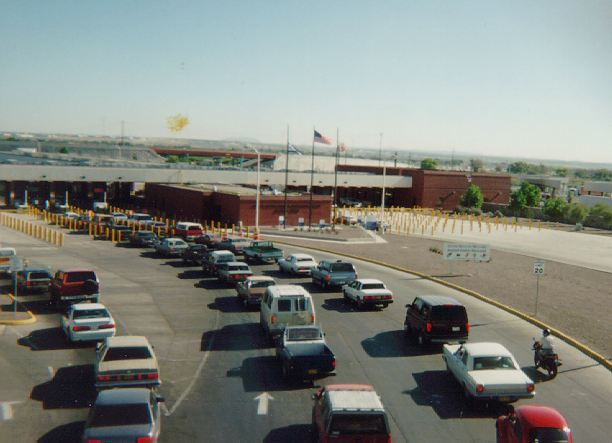
- El Paso Ysleta Port of Entry (1998)

Location
- Country: United States
- Location: 797 South Zaragosa Road, El Paso, Texas 79907 (Ysleta–Zaragoza International Bridge)
- Coordinates: 31.6711°N 106.3380°W

Details
- Opened: 1938

Statistics
- 2015 Cars: 15,397,712
- 2015 Trucks: 5,012,373
- Pedestrians: 10,668,447

Website
- http://www.cbp.gov/xp/cgov/toolbox/contacts/ports/tx/2402.xml

The Ysleta–Zaragoza International Bridge is a border crossing over the Rio Grande, connecting the United States–Mexico border cities of El Paso, Texas, US, and Ciudad Juárez, Chihuahua, Mexico.

== Description ==
The Ysleta–Zaragoza International Bridge consists of two four-lane bridges. One is for commercial traffic only and the other, also bearing two pedestrian walkways, is for private vehicles. The American side of the bridge is owned and operated by the City of El Paso.

The El Paso Ysleta Port of Entry was established in 1938 when the first bridge was built at this location. It was reconstructed in 1955. The current border inspection station was constructed along with the 1990 bridge reconstruction.

The bridge is also known as Zaragoza Bridge (Spanish: Puente Zaragoza) and Ysleta-Zaragoza Bridge (Spanish: Puente Ysleta-Zaragoza).

== See also ==
- List of international bridges in North America
