= El Paso Electric =

Utility company

- Type: Private company
- Industry: Electric utilities
- Founded: 1901; 125 years ago
- Headquarters: Stanton Tower; El Paso, Texas, United States
- Area served: Texas, New Mexico
- Key people: Kelly Tomblin, CEO
- Revenue: ▼US$861.99 million (2019)
- Net income: ▲US$123.03 million (2019)
- Number of employees: 1,100
- Website: www.epelectric.com

El Paso Electric is a Texas-based public utility company, engaging in the generation, transmission, and distribution of electricity in west Texas and southern New Mexico. Its energy sources consist of nuclear fuel, natural gas, purchased power, solar and wind turbines. The company owns six electrical generating facilities with a net dependable generating capability of approximately 2,010 megawatts. It serves approximately 437,000 residential, commercial, industrial, public authority, and wholesale customers.

The company distributes electricity to retail customers principally in El Paso, Texas and Las Cruces, New Mexico; and resells electricity to electric utilities and power marketers. Unlike most other Texas utilities, El Paso Electric operates as a monopoly.

In 2020, El Paso Electric was sold to the Infrastructure Investments Fund (IIF), a fund associated with investment bank, J.P. Morgan. Previously, the company was publicly traded on the New York Stock Exchange as EE.

El Paso Electric Company was founded in 1901 and is headquartered at the Stanton Tower in Downtown El Paso.

== History ==
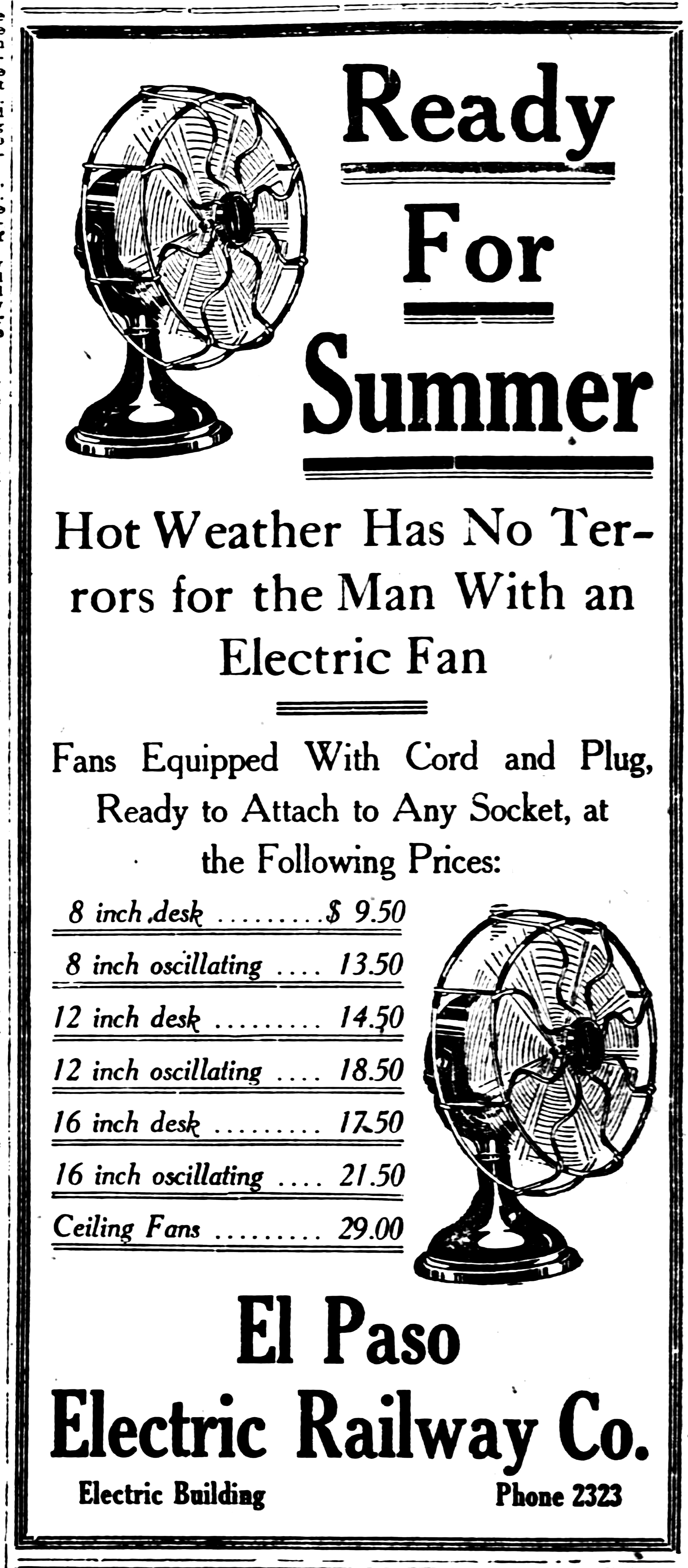
An electric fans ad by the El Paso Electric Railway Co. in the El Paso Herald on May 15, 1915

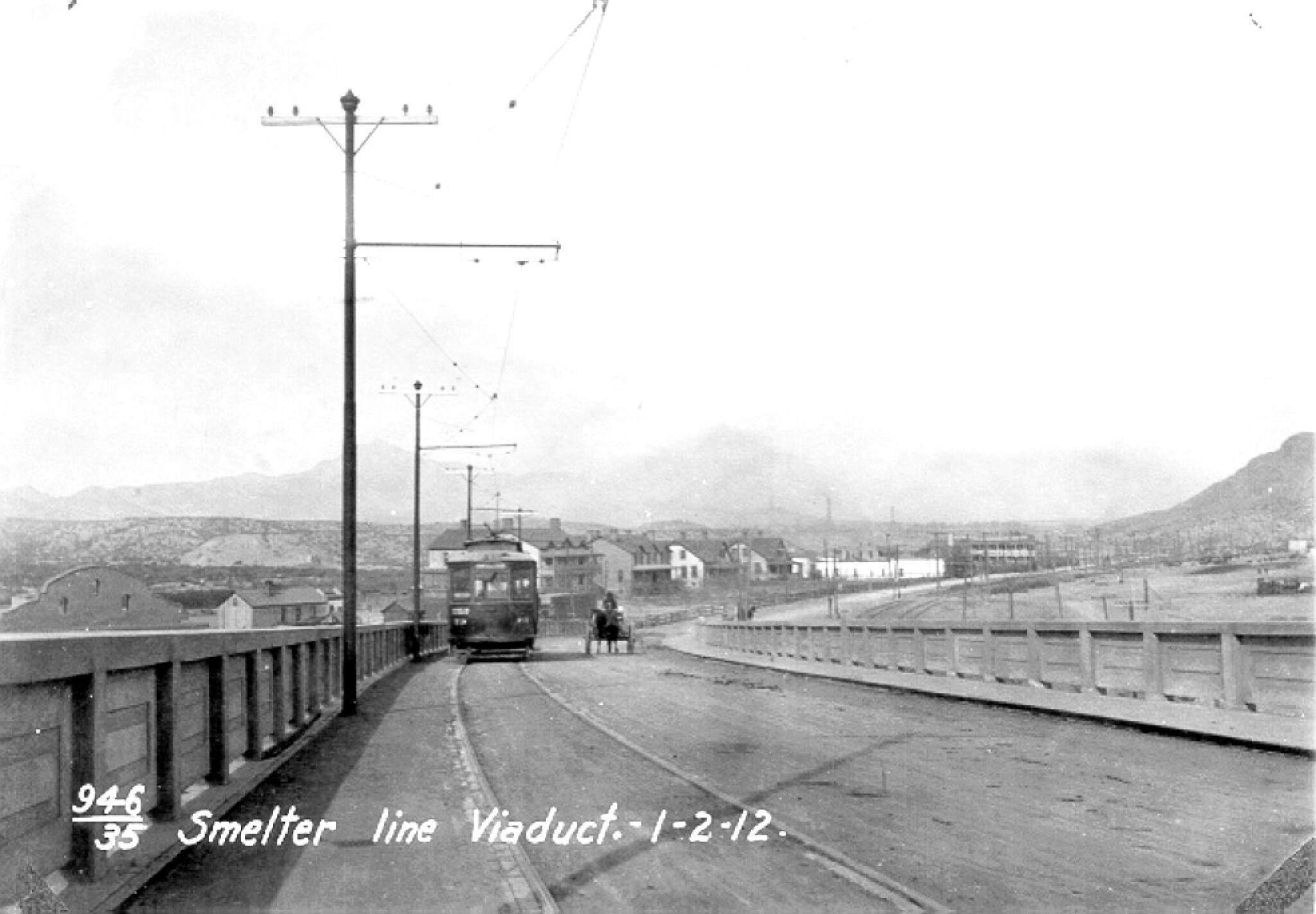
El Paso Electric Railway traveling from Smeltertown in 1912

El Paso Electric (EPE) first began serving its customers on August 30, 1901. It was then known as the El Paso Electric Railway Company. Initially its primary business consisted of providing transportation via mule-drawn streetcars, which were replaced in 1902 with electric streetcars.

By 1925, the company's core business had evolved to producing and distributing electricity. That year, the company changed its name to the El Paso Electric Company. It was also granted authorization to transact business in New Mexico.

Today, El Paso Electric is a regional electric utility providing generation, transmission, and distribution service to approximately 400,000 retail and wholesale customers in a 10,000-square-mile (26,000 km^{2}) area of the Rio Grande valley in west Texas and southern New Mexico. Its service territory extends from Hatch, New Mexico to Van Horn, Texas.

As of 2013, El Paso Electric had 32 electric car charging stations in its service area. The service stations recharge Nissan Leafs, Chevrolet Volts, and other electric cars. The company is also working to expand adoption of electric vehicles through its Plug-in Electric Vehicle and Charging Infrastructure Plan (PEVCIP) for the Rio Grande Valley region.

In 2019, the company reported annual operating revenues of $862 million and a net income of $123 million.

== 2020 Sale to Infrastructure Investments Fund ==
On July 29, 2020, El Paso Electric was sold to Infrastructure Investments Fund (IIF) with 99.61% of shareholders who voted approving the deal.

The sale was valued at $4.3 billion and included IIF assuming EPE's existing $1.5 billion in debt and purchasing the companies stock at $68.25 per share (cumulatively, $2.8 billion). Stipulations in the agreement included a commitment by IIF to keep the company's headquarters in El Paso and maintaining the companies staff for at least five years. All thirteen El Paso Electric Board Members received payouts and stock share awards ranging from $800,000 to over $8.8 million.

Because El Paso Electric is the sole provider of electricity for the region, prior to its acquisition, increases in electricity rates would have to be approved by the city council and state regulators. Some local leaders voiced opposition to the acquisition, citing concerns of unregulated rate increases to consumers. As part of the agreement, El Paso Electric touted a one time $21 million credit for El Paso customers and an $8.7 million credit for New Mexico customers, resulting in an average monthly bill decrease of $0.88 to $1.37.

As part of the transaction, EPE and IIF committed to investing $100 million in an Economic Sustainability Fund to promote economic development in the region. $80 million is committed to be distributed in the El Paso region, over 15 years, and $20 million in the New Mexico region, over 20 years.

== Transmission system ==
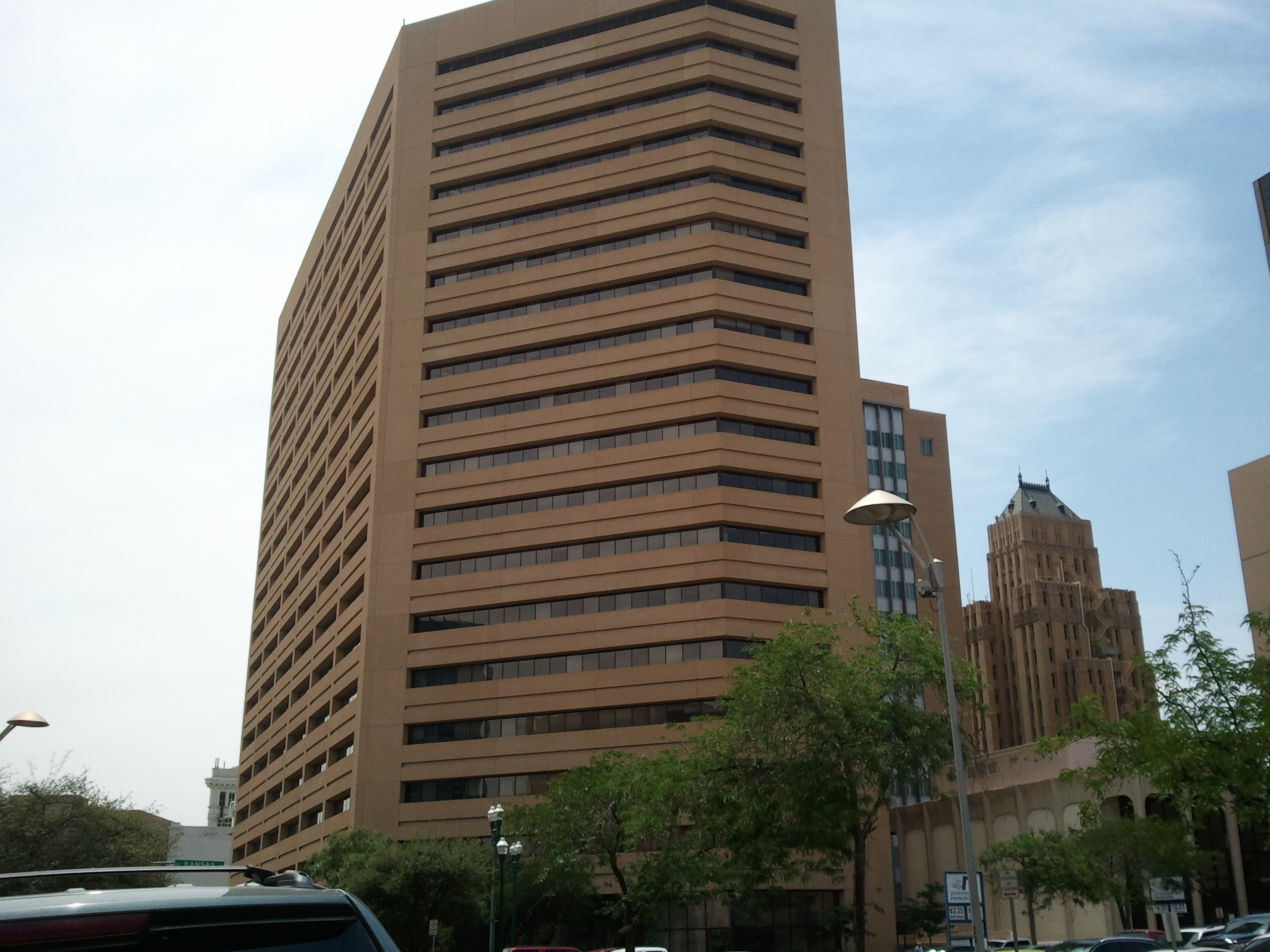
Stanton Tower is the corporate office for El Paso Electric.

El Paso Electric transmission system voltages are 115,000 volts and 345,000 volts. There are also two 115 kV interconnections with Mexico to the south.

== Generating plants ==
El Paso Electric ownership in power plants include a 15.8 percent interest in the Palo Verde Nuclear Generating Station near Tonopah, Arizona, the Rio Grande Power Station in Sunland Park, New Mexico, the Newman Power Station, the Copper Power Station and the Montana Power Station in El Paso and the Hueco Mountain Wind Ranch in Hudspeth County, Texas.

On February 20, 2014, El Paso Electric signed an agreement with Colorado-based Juwi Solar, Inc., to build a 10 megawatt (MW) solar energy facility in Northeast El Paso next to EPE's Newman Generation Station. JSI will be responsible for developing, designing, building, and operating the Newman Solar project. The design phase will begin in early summer of this year, shortly followed by construction and final completion of the project tentatively scheduled for the end of 2014. The construction of the new solar facility will help power over 3,800 homes throughout the year. The facility will be built on approximately 100 acres. EPE will sublease the land in partnership with the El Paso Water Utilities (EPWU) and currently leased to EPE for the Newman Generation Station. EPE currently has 47 MWs of solar power in its generation mix and recently secured an additional 50 MWs of solar power that will be online by the summer of this year. In total, 5 percent of EPE's dedicated generation, which includes long-term purchase power agreements, will come from solar energy.

== Lawsuits ==
In January 2003, a complaint was filed against El Paso Electric alleging that the company issued materially false and misleading information by misrepresenting and/or omitting adverse facts concerning illegal arrangements with Enron Corporation and by artificially inflating revenues. A settlement of $10,000,000 was reached in 2005.
