= West Texas =

- Region
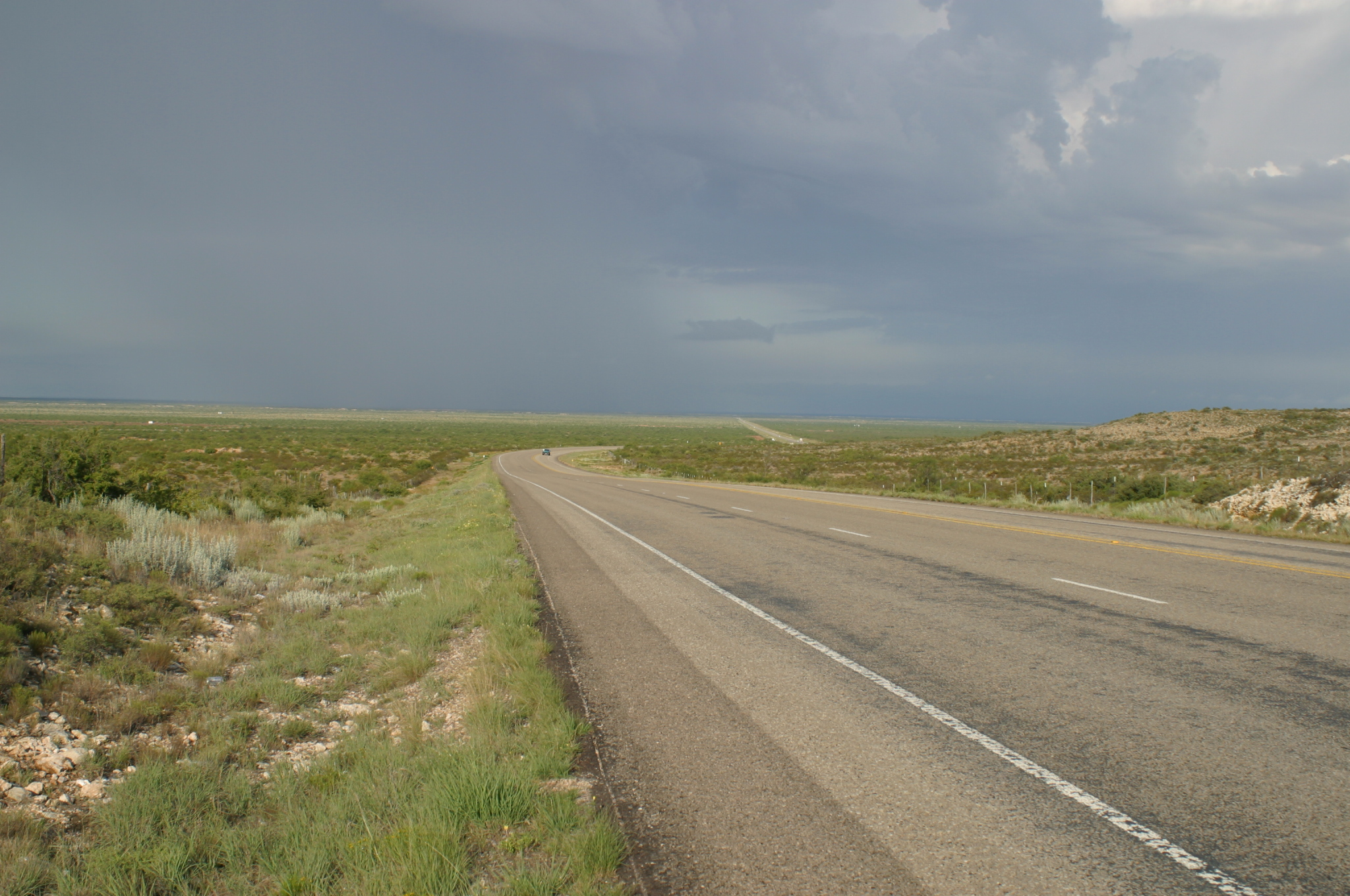
- West of Notrees

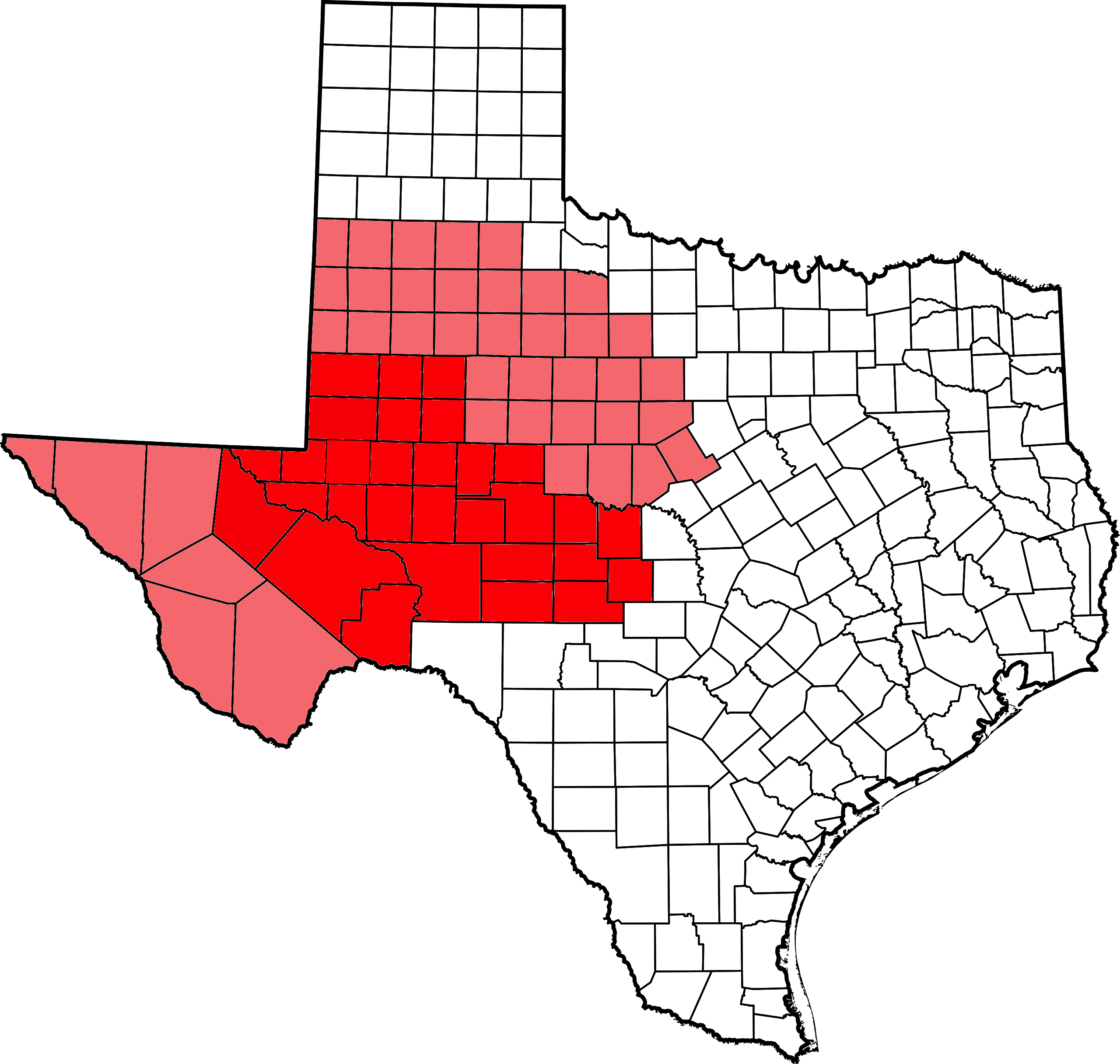
- West Texas counties in red; counties sometimes included in West Texas in pink
- Country: United States
- State: Texas
- Largest city: El Paso

West Texas is a loosely defined region in the U.S. state of Texas, generally encompassing the arid and semiarid lands west of a line drawn between the cities of Wichita Falls, Abilene, and Del Rio.

No consensus exists on the boundary between East Texas and West Texas. While most Texans understand these terms, no boundaries are officially recognized and any two people are likely to describe the boundaries of these regions differently. The historian and geographer Walter Prescott Webb has suggested that the 98th meridian separates East and West Texas; writer A.C. Greene proposed that West Texas extends west of the Brazos River. Use of a single line, though, seems to preclude the use of other separators, such as an area—Central Texas. Texas is part of the South and the American Southwest at the same time, while the semiarid and desert climates of West Texas are clearly characteristic of the Southwest.

West Texas is often subdivided according to distinct physiographic features. The portion of West Texas that lies west of the Pecos River is often called "Far West Texas" or the "Trans-Pecos", a term introduced in 1887 by geologist Robert T. Hill. The Trans-Pecos lies within the Chihuahuan Desert and is the most arid part of the state. Another part of West Texas is the Llano Estacado, a vast region of high, level plains extending into Eastern New Mexico and the Texas Panhandle. East of the Llano Estacado lies the "redbed country" of the Rolling Plains, and south of the Llano Estacado lies the Edwards Plateau. The Rolling Plains and Edwards Plateau subregions act as transitional zones between eastern and western Texas.

== Climate ==
West Texas receives much less rainfall than the rest of Texas and has an arid or semiarid climate, requiring most of its scant agriculture to depend heavily on irrigation. Northern portions of the area are irrigated with water from underground sources, such as the Ogallala Aquifer. Irrigation withdrawal and water taken out farther north for the needs of El Paso and Juarez, Mexico, have reduced the Rio Grande to a stream in some places, even dry at times.

Parts of West Texas have rugged terrain, including many small mountain ranges, while most parts of the state are closer to sea level. The northern parts of West Texas and the higher elevations of the mountain ranges of the Trans-Pecos region are prone to occasional heavy snowfall during winter, whereas snow is less common in other areas of West Texas.

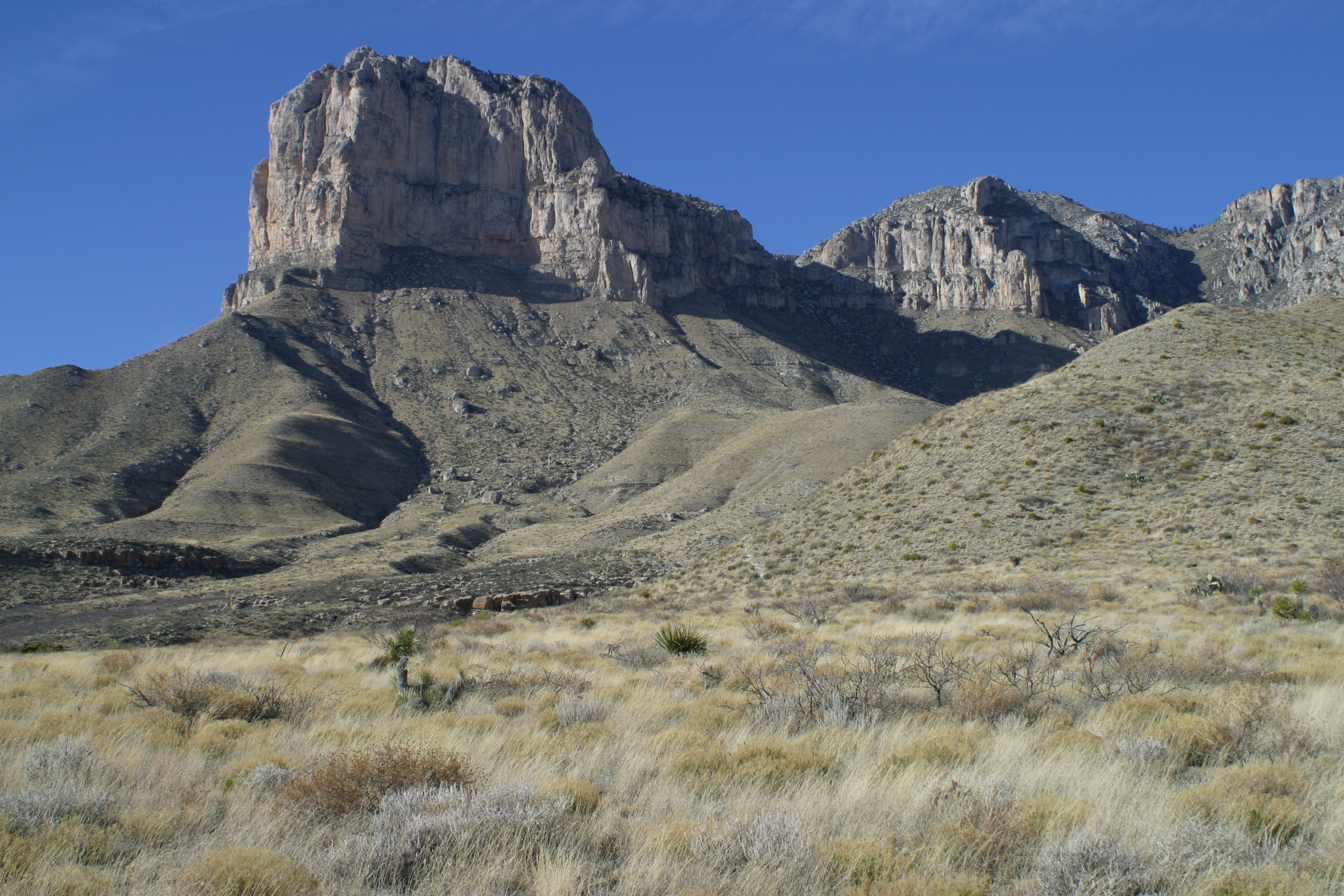
Guadalupe Mountains

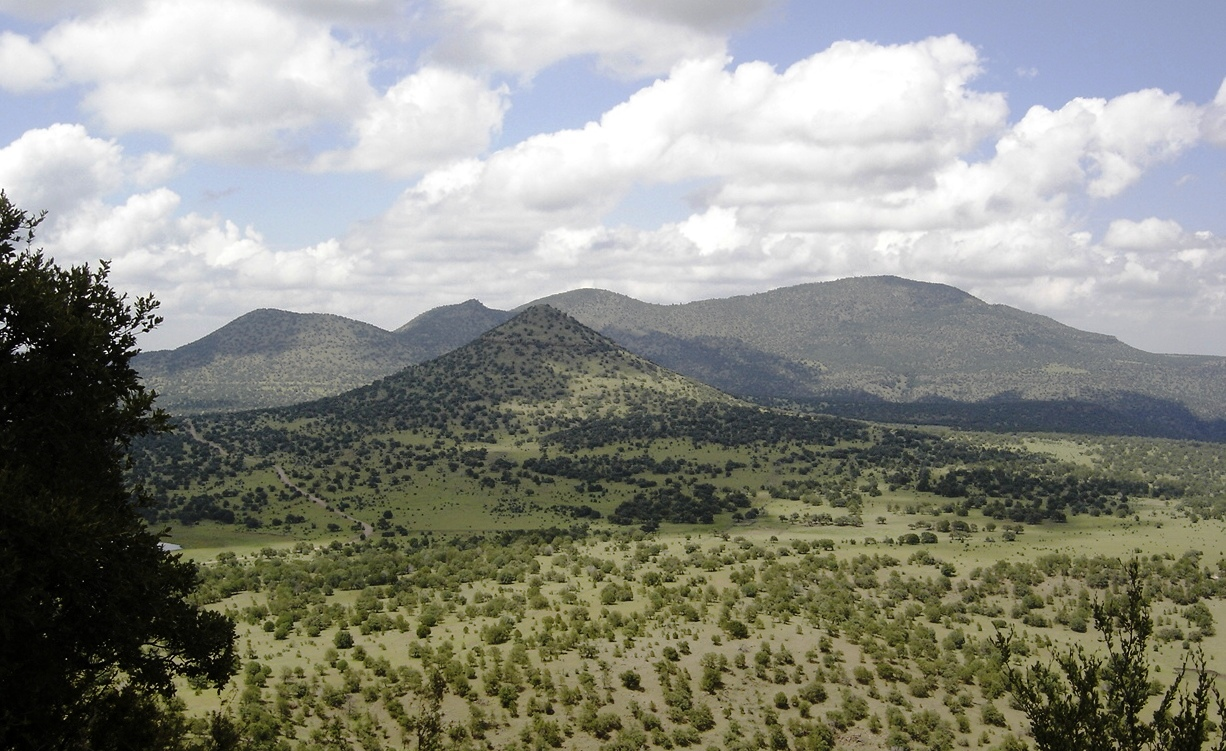
Davis Mountains

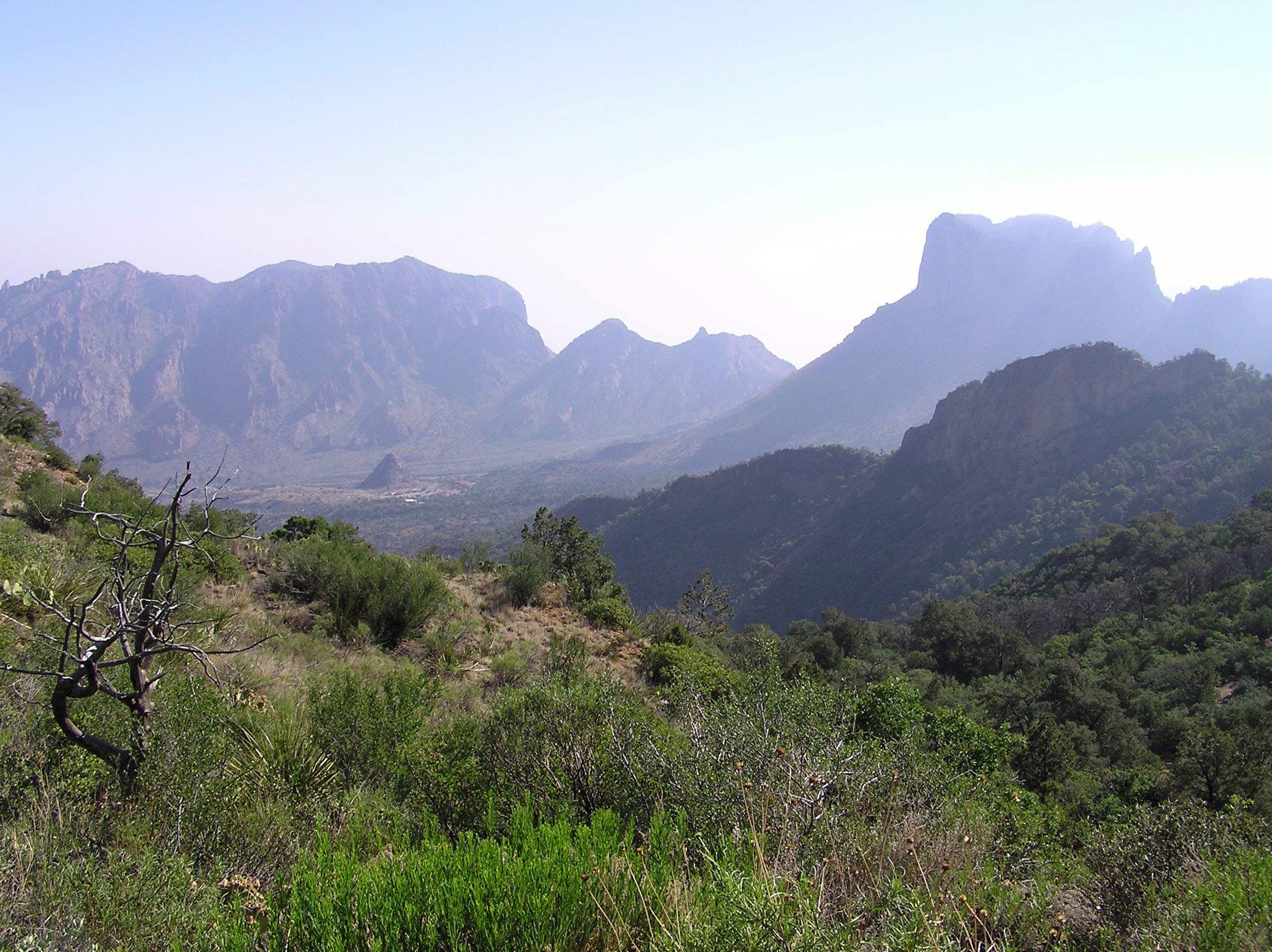
Chisos Mountains

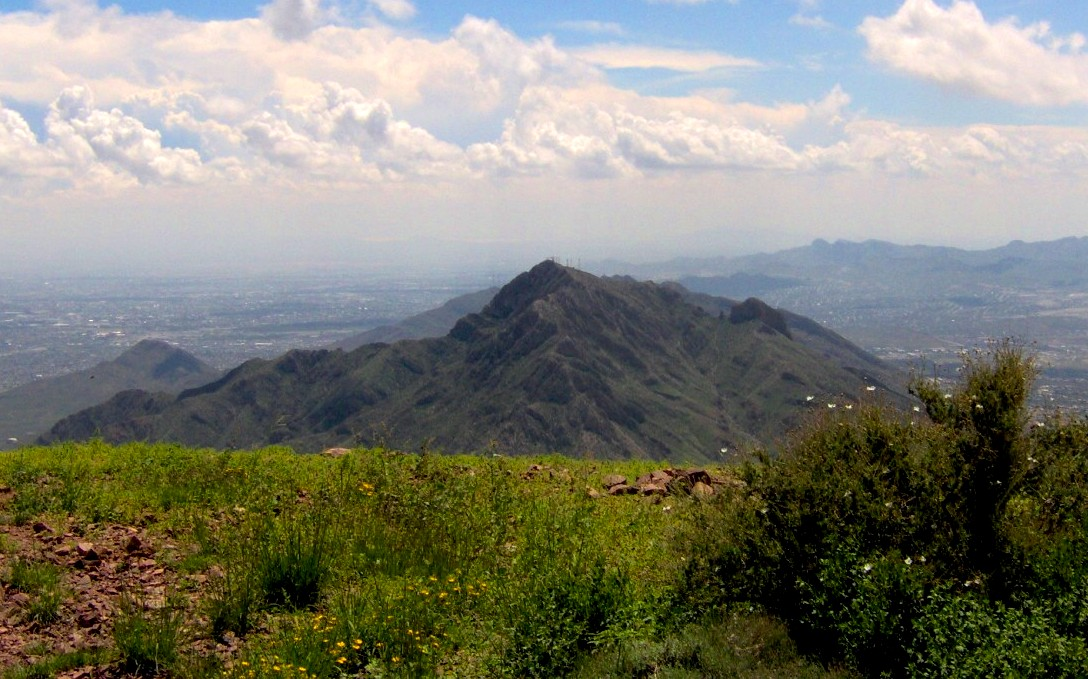
Franklin Mountains

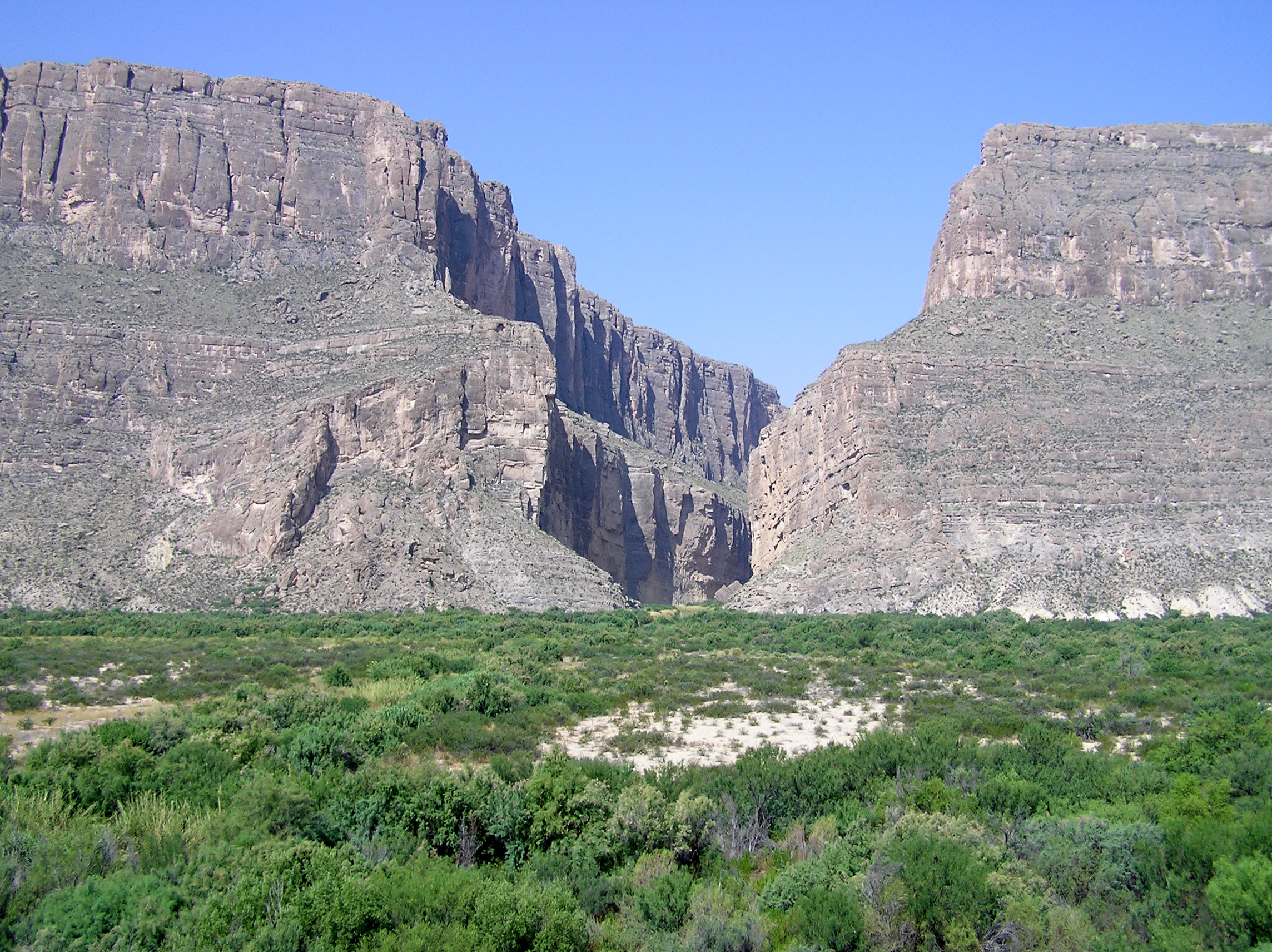
Santa Elena Canyon

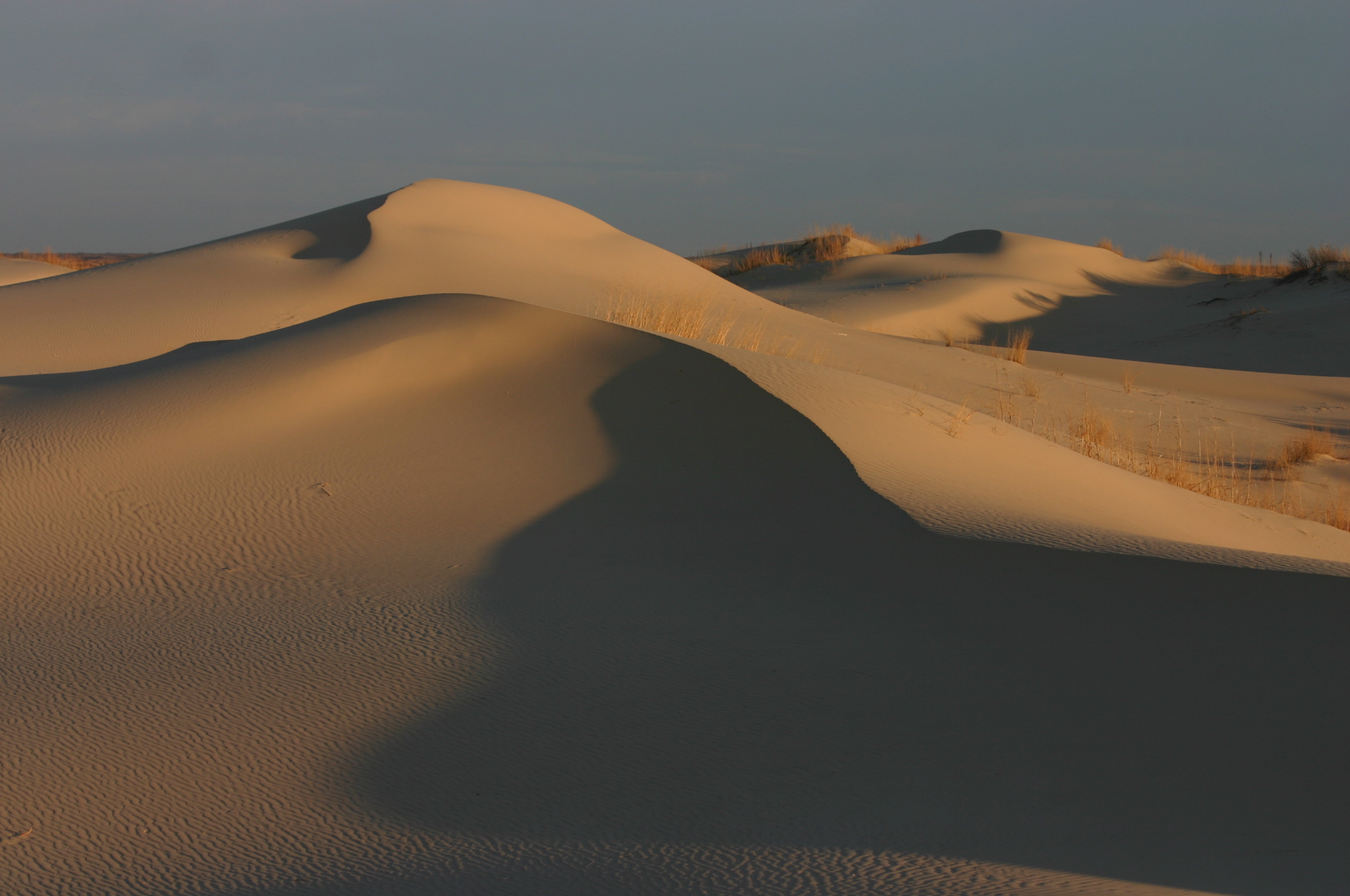
Monahans Sandhills State Park

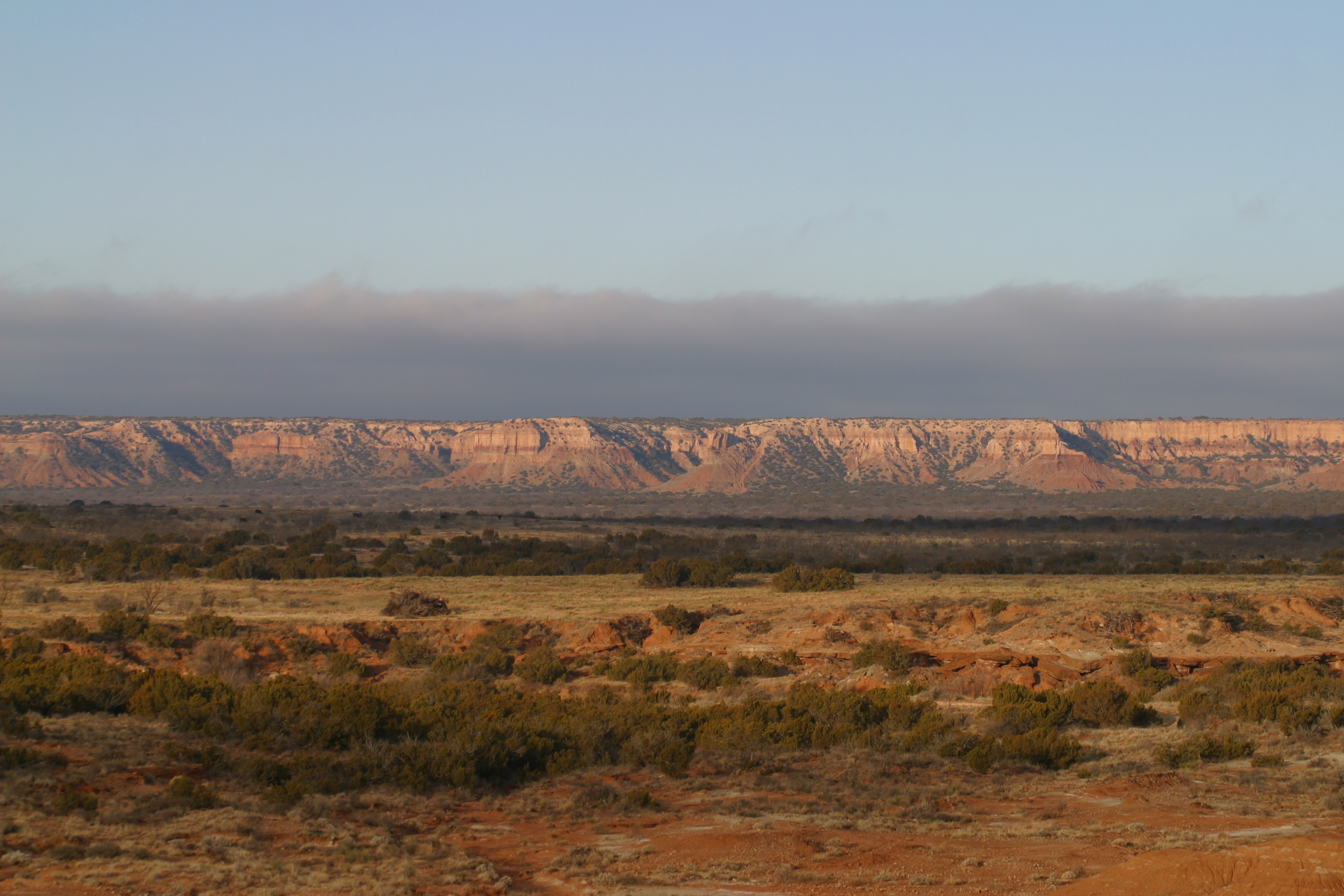
Llano Estacado

== Counties ==
The 70 counties of West Texas are Andrews, Bailey, Borden, Brewster, Brown, Callahan, Cochran, Coke, Coleman, Comanche, Concho, Crane, Crockett, Crosby, Culberson, Dawson, Dickens, Eastland, Ector, El Paso, Fisher, Floyd, Gaines, Garza, Glasscock, Hale, Haskell, Hockley, Howard, Hudspeth, Irion, Jeff Davis, Jones, Kent, Kimble, King, Knox, Lamb, Loving, Lubbock, Lynn, Martin, Mason, McCulloch, Menard, Midland, Mitchell, Motley, Nolan, Pecos, Presidio, Reagan, Reeves, Runnels, Schleicher, Scurry, Shackelford, Stephens, Sterling, Stonewall, Sutton, Taylor, Terrell, Terry, Throckmorton, Tom Green, Upton, Ward, Winkler, and Yoakum.

== Major cities ==
Rank		Image	City	County(ies)	Population (2023 estimate)
Region	State	Image	City	County(ies)	Population (2023 estimate)
1	6		El Paso	El Paso	678,958
2	10		Lubbock	Lubbock	266,878
3	25		Midland	Midland, Martin	138,397
4	29		Abilene	Taylor, Jones	129,043
5	34		Odessa	Ector, Midland	115,743
6	43		San Angelo	Tom Green	99,262
7	95		Socorro	El Paso	38,238
8	133		Horizon City	El Paso	24,168
9	140		Big Spring	Howard	22,373
10	155		Plainview	Hale	19,420

Smaller West Texas cities and towns include Alpine, Andrews, Anthony, Brownfield, Canutillo, Coyanosa, Crane, Fabens, Fort Davis, Fort Stockton, Hale Center, Horizon City, Iraan, Kermit, Lamesa, Levelland, Littlefield, Marathon, Marfa, McCamey, Mertzon, Monahans, Ozona, Pecos, Post, Rankin, Ransom Canyon, San Elizario, Seminole, Slaton, Snyder, Sweetwater, and Van Horn.

== Economy ==
Major industries include livestock, petroleum and natural gas production, textiles such as cotton, grain, and because of very large military installations such as Fort Bliss, the defense industry. West Texas has become notable for its numerous wind turbines producing clean and alternative electricity.

As of 2018, the West Texan economy was in a prosperous economic period, which has been described as the "West Texas oil boom".

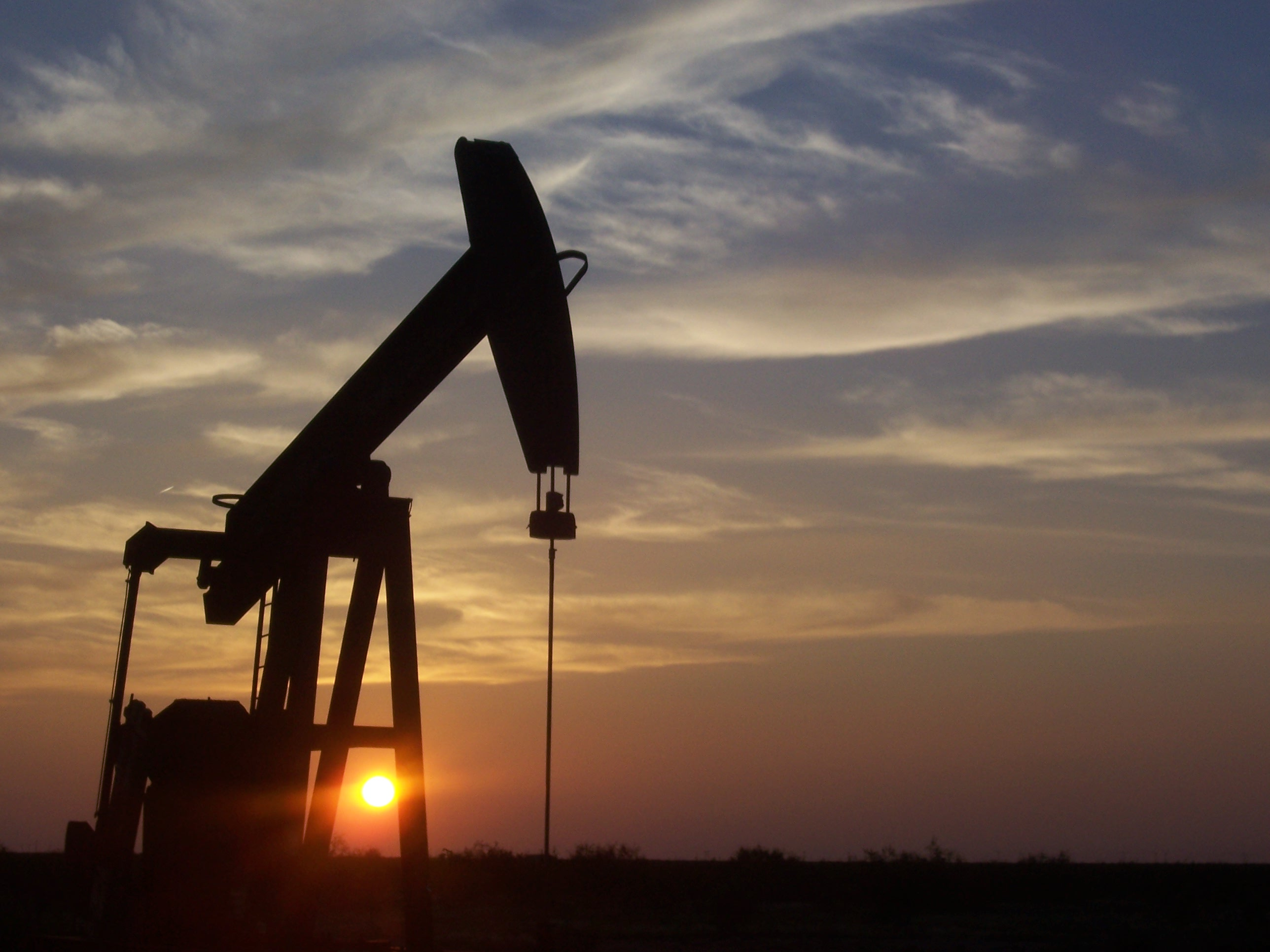
Pumpjacks, like this one south of Midland, are a common sight in West Texas oil fields.

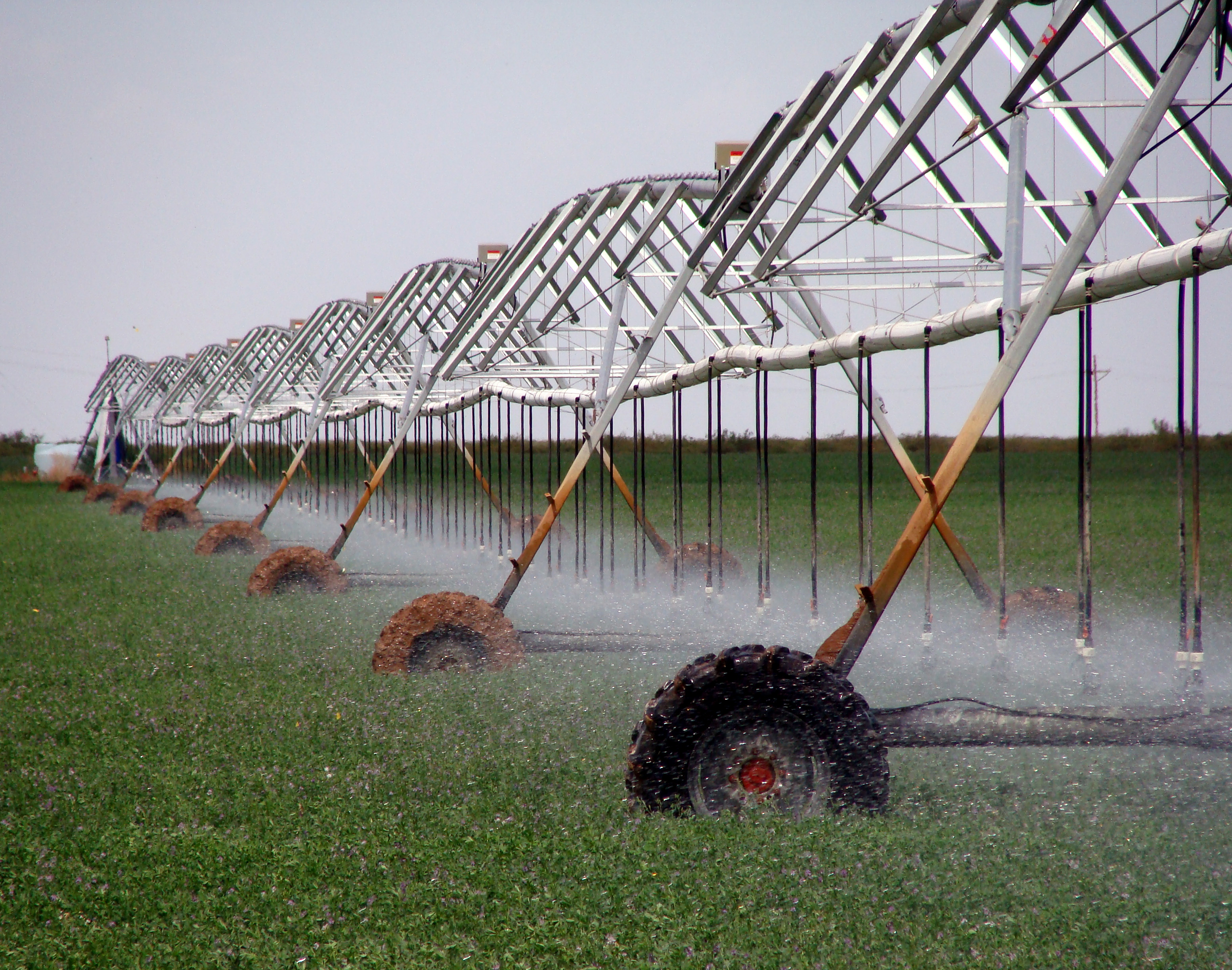
Irrigated agriculture in West Texas

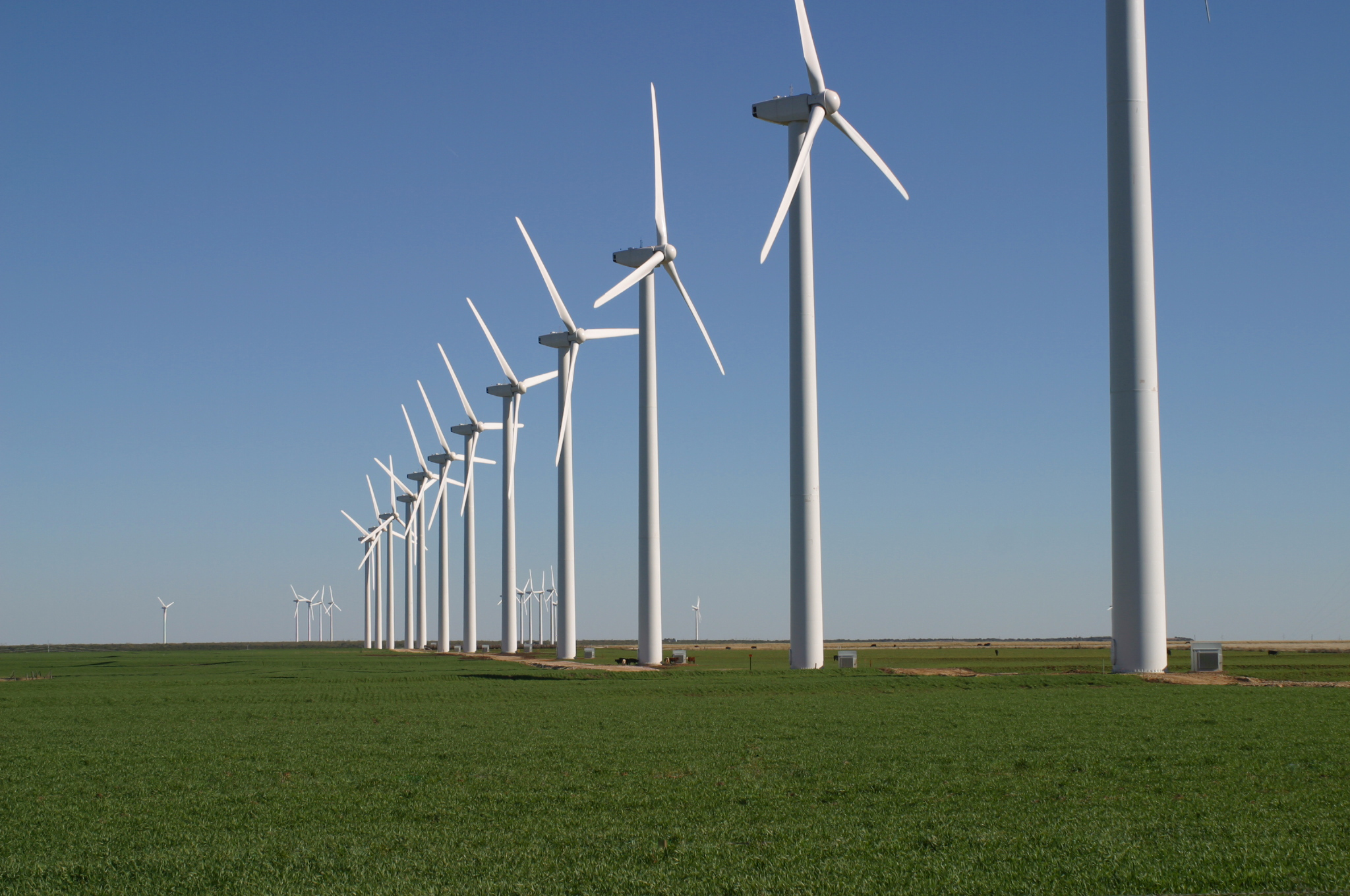
The Brazos Wind Farm near Fluvanna is one of many wind farms in West Texas.

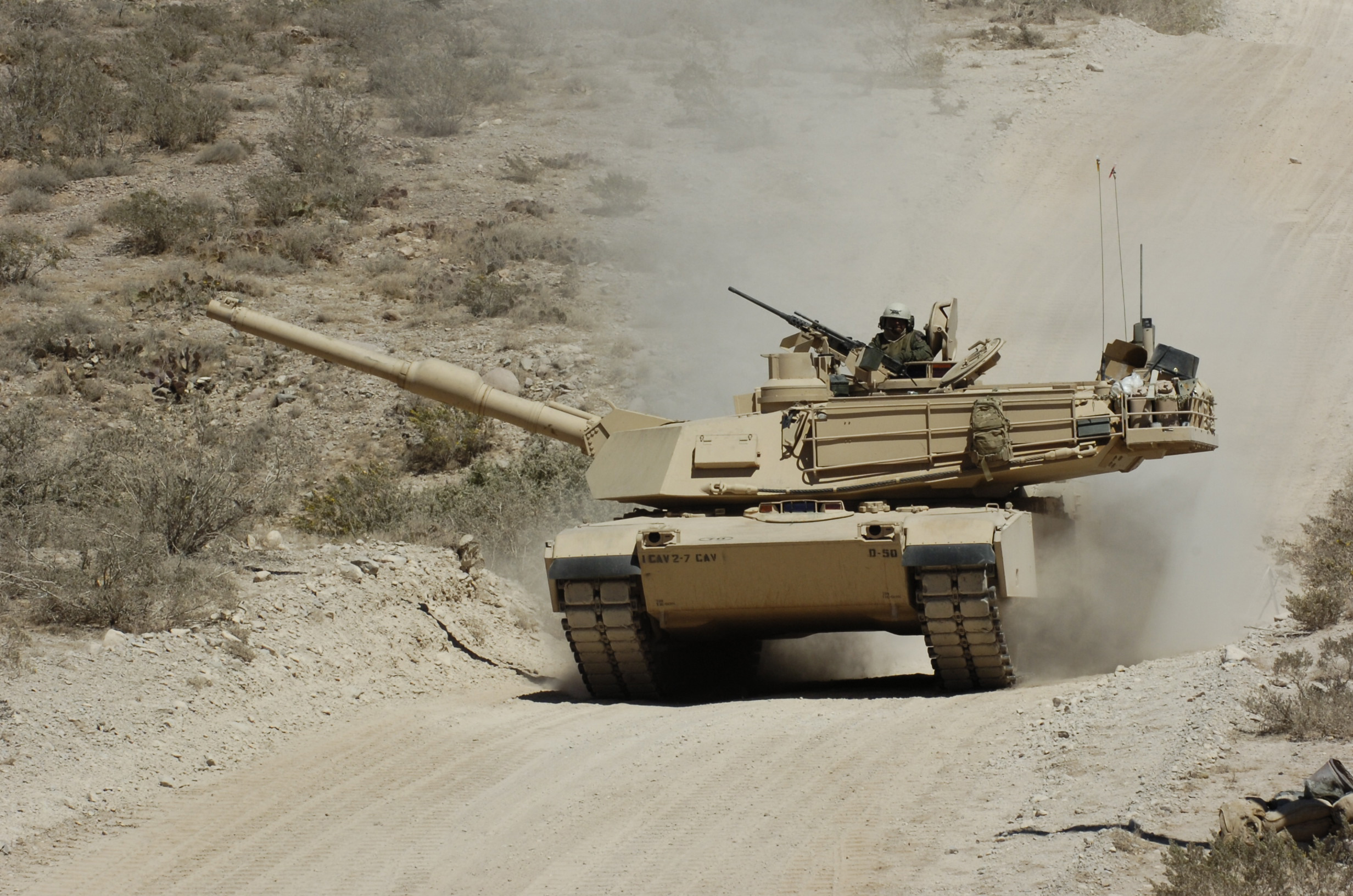
Fort Bliss is the top employer in the El Paso region.

== Sports ==
While no major league teams are in the West Texas region, sports fans are faithful to their local high school and college teams. NCAA Division I college teams include the Texas Tech Red Raiders, the UTEP Miners, and the Abilene Christian Wildcats . NCAA Division II teams include the West Texas A&M Buffaloes, the Texas–Permian Basin Falcons, and the Lubbock Christian Chaparrals and Lady Chaps.

El Paso hosts the El Paso Chihuahuas, a AAA baseball team, and the El Paso Locomotive FC, which plays in the USL Championship, the second tier of the American soccer pyramid. The Midland RockHounds and Amarillo Sod Poodles represent the region in double-A baseball. Junior hockey is also present in the region, with the Odessa Jackalopes of the Tier II North American Hockey League.

== Health ==
In January 2025, an outbreak of measles began spreading in West Texas, and later in February in neighboring New Mexico. The cause of the outbreak was attributed to declining vaccination rates among infants.

== Politics ==
2024 U.S. presidential election in Texas results by county

Except for the Trans-Pecos region, West Texas has become well known as a stronghold for conservative politics. Some of the most heavily Republican counties in the United States are in the region. Former U.S. President George W. Bush spent most of his childhood in West Texas. The region is somewhat more conservative than neighboring Eastern New Mexico.

The region includes much of the Permian Basin, the highest producing oil field in the United States. This likely inclines the region to support the Republican Party over the Democratic Party, as the latter supports environmentalism and action on climate change.

Several counties in the Midland-Odessa area were some of the first parts of Texas to abandon the state's "Solid South" Democratic roots. Two of the largest, Midland and Ector, have not supported a Democrat for president since 1948. The Rolling Plains to the east remained Democratic substantially longer; although Walter Mondale's 1984 campaign lost Texas by 27.50%, he won three counties in this region. (Note: West Texas Plains "Bible Belt" counties voting for Mondale in 1984 were Dickens County, Fisher County, and Stonewall County.) Since 2000, this region swung very rapidly toward the Republican Party due to its population's intransigent opposition to the liberal social policies of the Democratic Party, and by 2016, it had nearly the same Cook PVI as the Panhandle.

West Texas presidential election results
Year	Democratic	Republican	Third parties
2024	33.1% 271,756	65.8% 539,383	1.1% 9,090
2020	38.2% 319,565	60.3% 504,487	1.5% 12,180
2016	37.3% 260,775	58.1% 406,359	4.6% 32,248
2012	36.0% 222,761	64.0% 396,008	0% 0

== West of the Pecos in popular culture ==
"West of the Pecos" has become a metaphor for the universe of Westerns. "Fastest draw west of the Pecos" and similar superlatives are a cliche, and the title character of Chisum observed "There’s no law west of Dodge, and no God west of the Pecos”.

Cormac McCarthy's novel No Country for Old Men and its subsequent film adaptation take place in West Texas, and much of the movie was filmed there.

== See also ==
- Beach Mountains
- Big Bend National Park
- Chalk Mountains
- Chamizal National Memorial
- Davis Mountains
- Franklin Mountains State Park
- Guadalupe Mountains National Park
- Hueco Tanks State Historic Site
- List of geographical regions in Texas
- Llano Estacado
- McKittrick Canyon
- Mount Blanco
- West Texas Intermediate
- Wind power in Texas
- Wyler Aerial Tramway
- Ysleta del Sur Pueblo
