= North Franklin Mountain =

Mountain in Texas, United States

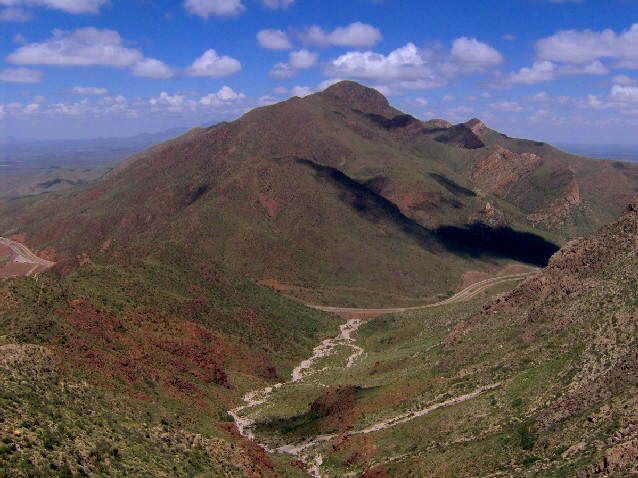
- North Franklin Mountain, looking northeast from South Franklin Mountain

Highest point
- Elevation: 7,192 ft (2,192 m)
- Prominence: 2,981 ft (909 m)
- Coordinates: 31°54′10″N 106°29′36″W

Geography
- Location: El Paso County, Texas, U.S.
- Parent range: Franklin Mountains
- Topo map: USGS North Franklin Mountain

Climbing
- Easiest route: Mundy's Gap Trail + North Franklin Peak Trail

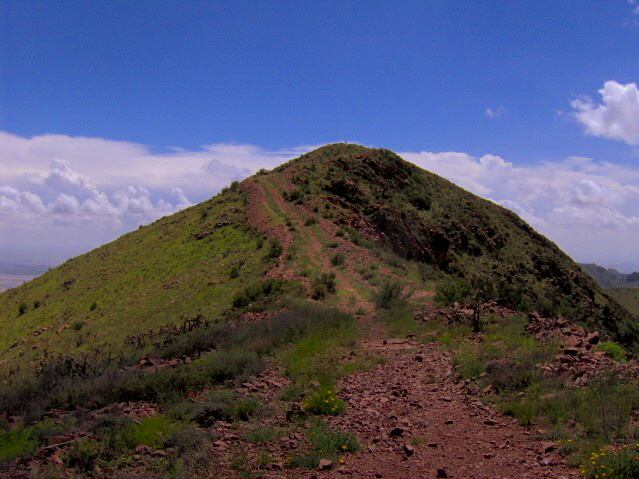
The summit ridge of North Franklin Mountain, with its characteristic iron-rich volcanic rock

North Franklin Mountain (or North Franklin Peak) is a mountain in the Franklin Mountains of El Paso, Texas, located in the Southwestern United States. North Franklin, at 7,192 feet (2,192 m), is the highest point in El Paso, and the 27th-highest mountain in the state of Texas. Surrounded by a state park and with a maintained trail leading to its summit, the mountain is a popular hiking destination. The eastern slope extends into Castner Range National Monument.

North Franklin is located entirely within the city of El Paso, approximately 10 miles (16 km) east of the Texas–New Mexico border and 15 miles (24 km) north of the U.S.–Mexico border. The mountain is the highest of the Franklins, clipping nearby Anthony's Nose by just over 200 feet (61 m) and neighboring South Franklin by nearly 300 feet (91 m). North Franklin rises 3,300 feet (1,000 m) above both its western base in the Mesilla Valley and its eastern base in the Hueco Bolson. In spite of its name, North Franklin is actually in the central Franklins, being the northernmost of the range's two key peaks (South Franklin, of course, is the other). To the south of these, the South Franklins include the peaks Mount Franklin and Ranger Peak (all of the television broadcast towers for El Paso are in the Southern Franklins).

Like most of the Franklins, North Franklin Mountain is visible from many miles away. When observed from the east or west, North Franklin is shaped like a scalene triangle, with its long side facing its dome-shaped sister peak South Franklin Mountain. This quality makes it a valuable navigation point when traversing the desert areas around El Paso.

== Geology ==
The Franklin Mountains are tilted-block fault mountains composed of sedimentary rocks, some of which date back to Precambrian times and are among the oldest in Texas. The mountains are the southernmost extent of the Laramide orogeny, which occurred 60-70 million years ago. The Precambrian rocks atop North Franklin Mountain represent "the highest geological structure in the state of Texas."

North Franklin gets its reddish color from the unusually high levels of oxidized iron in the volcanic rocks coating its summit and higher slopes.

== History ==
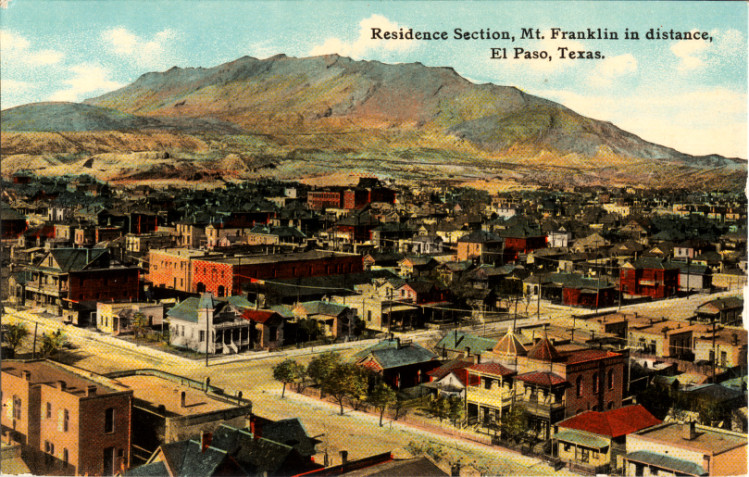
Residence Section and Mt. Franklin, El Paso, Texas, c. 1912

For centuries, Native Americans and other travellers have used the vegetation and wildlife in the Franklins when crossing the Paso del Norte—the gap between the Franklin Mountains and the Juarez Mountains that is now the site of Ciudad Juárez and El Paso. Pictographs and mortar pits attest to a human presence in the mountains dating back more than 12,000 years.

The Franklin Mountains are probably named after Benjamin Franklin Coons, who in 1849 purchased a ranch in what is now the El Paso area. Initially known as Coons Ranch, by 1851 the settlement had apparently taken Coons' middle name and was called "Franklin". Despite the town being officially named El Paso in 1852, the locals continued to call it Franklin throughout the 1850s.

The El Paso Tin Mining and Smelting Company operated a tin mine on the northeast slope of North Franklin from 1909–1915. While the mine had the distinction of being the only tin mine ever located in the U.S., the venture was an economic failure. Today, a trail leading to the ruins of the mine forks off the North Franklin Peak Trail, just east of Mundy's Gap.

== Access ==
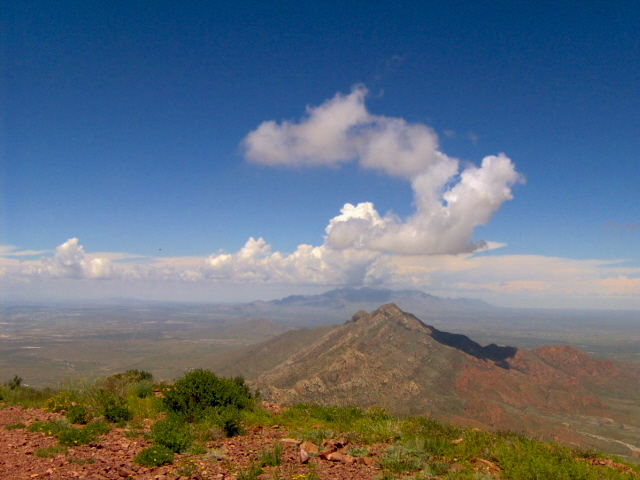
Looking north from the summit of North Franklin Mountain; Anthony's Nose is below, and the Organ Mountains are in distance

The trailhead is in the Tom Mays Unit (not the park headquarters in McKelligon Canyon) of the Franklin Mountains State Park near the summit of Woodrow Bean Transmountain Drive (Highway Loop 375). The Mundy's Gap Trail rises out of the Tom Mays section and winds 1.6 miles (2.6 km) to Mundy's Gap, on the north slope of North Franklin Mountain. From Mundy's Gap, the North Franklin Peak Trail follows the mountain's eastern slope for approximately three miles to the summit. Various spur trails branch off the main trail along the way.

The summit of North Franklin has been flattened out, with an area equal to the size of a small parking lot. The only man-made structure at the summit is a 10-foot (3.0 m) ham radio repeater and ELT receiver maintained by the West Texas Repeater Association. On a typical day, the Organ Mountains of New Mexico can be seen along the horizon to the north. To the east, the Guadalupe Mountains rise some 100 miles (160 km) in the distance. Most of the Mesilla Valley is visible to the west, including parts of El Paso and Ciudad Juárez, and most of the town of Anthony. South Franklin Mountain and the Juarez Mountains are to the south.

Anthony's Nose, the second highest peak, can be accessed from Tom Mays Unit by an unofficial trail originating from the C5 campsite (parking is at the same place as for the Aztec Cave trail). From the C5 campsite, the trail gradually winds uphill to the left, then goes directly up to the ridgeline across a narrow rocky pass. The trail then follows the ridgeline northward about 2 miles directly to Anthony's Nose. Although no technical gear is needed, there are a couple of difficult climbing areas along the way and the entire round trip takes about 10 hours. Once again, it is not an official trail, so it is not as well-maintained as other trails in the park.

== Climate ==
The climate type of North Franklin Mountain belongs to the hot-summer mediterranean climate (Köppen: Csa), which is close to cold semi-arid climate (Köppen: BSk). Unlike the desert climate of downtown El Paso, the state park is located at a higher altitude in the mountains, which can intercept a large amount of moisture from the air, thereby forming precipitation.

Climate data for North Franklin Mountain, 1991–2020 normals
| Month | Jan | Feb | Mar | Apr | May | Jun | Jul | Aug | Sep | Oct | Nov | Dec | Year |
|---|---|---|---|---|---|---|---|---|---|---|---|---|---|
| Mean daily maximum °F (°C) | 52.8 (11.6) | 54.8 (12.7) | 61.1 (16.2) | 68.9 (20.5) | 77.4 (25.2) | 86.9 (30.5) | 85.9 (29.9) | 83.6 (28.7) | 78.7 (25.9) | 70.6 (21.4) | 60.3 (15.7) | 53.2 (11.8) | 69.5 (20.8) |
| Daily mean °F (°C) | 42.0 (5.6) | 43.5 (6.4) | 49.2 (9.6) | 56.0 (13.3) | 64.6 (18.1) | 73.9 (23.3) | 73.8 (23.2) | 72.2 (22.3) | 67.3 (19.6) | 58.7 (14.8) | 49.1 (9.5) | 42.5 (5.8) | 57.7 (14.3) |
| Mean daily minimum °F (°C) | 31.2 (−0.4) | 32.3 (0.2) | 37.2 (2.9) | 43.1 (6.2) | 51.9 (11.1) | 60.8 (16.0) | 61.8 (16.6) | 60.9 (16.1) | 55.9 (13.3) | 46.8 (8.2) | 37.9 (3.3) | 31.8 (−0.1) | 46.0 (7.8) |
| Average precipitation inches (mm) | 0.61 (15) | 0.53 (13) | 0.39 (9.9) | 0.42 (11) | 0.46 (12) | 0.72 (18) | 4.25 (108) | 2.27 (58) | 2.17 (55) | 0.86 (22) | 0.71 (18) | 1.32 (34) | 14.71 (373.9) |
| Average dew point °F (°C) | 18.2 (−7.7) | 17.0 (−8.3) | 17.8 (−7.9) | 18.3 (−7.6) | 24.9 (−3.9) | 35.0 (1.7) | 48.2 (9.0) | 50.1 (10.1) | 44.8 (7.1) | 32.9 (0.5) | 23.4 (−4.8) | 20.0 (−6.7) | 29.2 (−1.5) |
Source: PRISM Climate Group
