= Wyler Aerial Tramway =

Inactive aerial tramway in Texas

Coordinates: 31°48′32″N 106°28′41″W

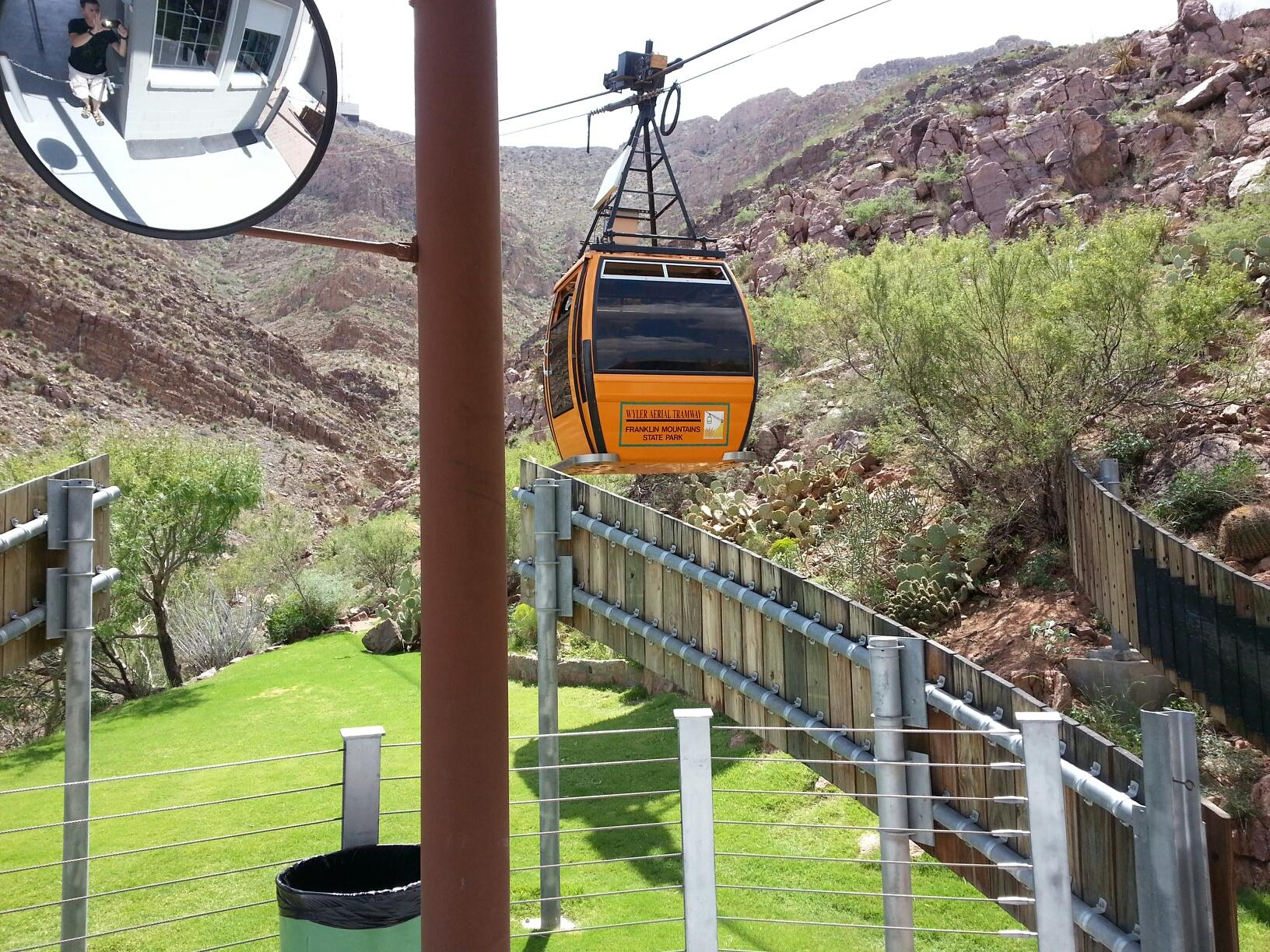
Wyler Aerial Tramway

Wyler Aerial Tramway is an aerial tramway in El Paso, Texas, United States that opened to the public in 1960. The tramway is operated by the Texas Parks and Wildlife Department and is located in Franklin Mountains State Park. The tramway complex covers 196 acres (0.79 km^{2}) on the east side of the Franklin Mountains. The gondolas travel along two 2600 foot 1 3/8" diameter steel cables to Ranger Peak, 5,632 feet (1,717 m) above sea level. The trip takes about four minutes and lifts riders up 940 vertical feet above the boarding area. From Ranger Peak viewers can see three states and two countries on a clear day. The tramway was closed indefinitely to the public in September 2018. A new tram system and visitor center are planned; however, there is no firm public opening date yet.

== History ==
The tramway was built in 1959 by KTSM radio to aid in the construction of a transmitter tower. Karl O. Wyler managed the project. First opening to the public as the El Paso Aerial Tramway, the facility provided rides from 1960 to 1986, when high liability insurance costs forced the tram to stop public operations. The tram was only used to service the transmitter towers. Wyler donated the tramway for public use in his will. The Texas Parks and Wildlife Department accepted the donation in 1997 and renovated and re-opened the tramway to the public in 2001. The tramway was closed indefinitely in September 2018 after the Texas Parks and Wildlife conducted an engineering analysis that concluded "the tram has surpassed its life expectancy and is no longer suited for public use." TPWD estimated the replacement of the tram would cost millions of dollars and the agency did not have the financial resources to execute a capital construction project of this size at that time.

In July 2024, it was announced that plans for repairs of the tramway were underway. As of November 2025, the Texas Legislature appropriated $20 million in funding to update the tramway to once again make it safe and suitable for public use. Phase I of the project included expanded parking, improved accessibility, upgraded restrooms, and new visitor amenities. Another $7 million was appropriated to start phase II. The Texas Parks and Wildlife Foundation (TPWF) will attempt to raise an additional $5–7 million to complete phase II which will include construction of a modern tramway system, visitor center, aerial station, and expanded trails and facilities.

== Gallery ==
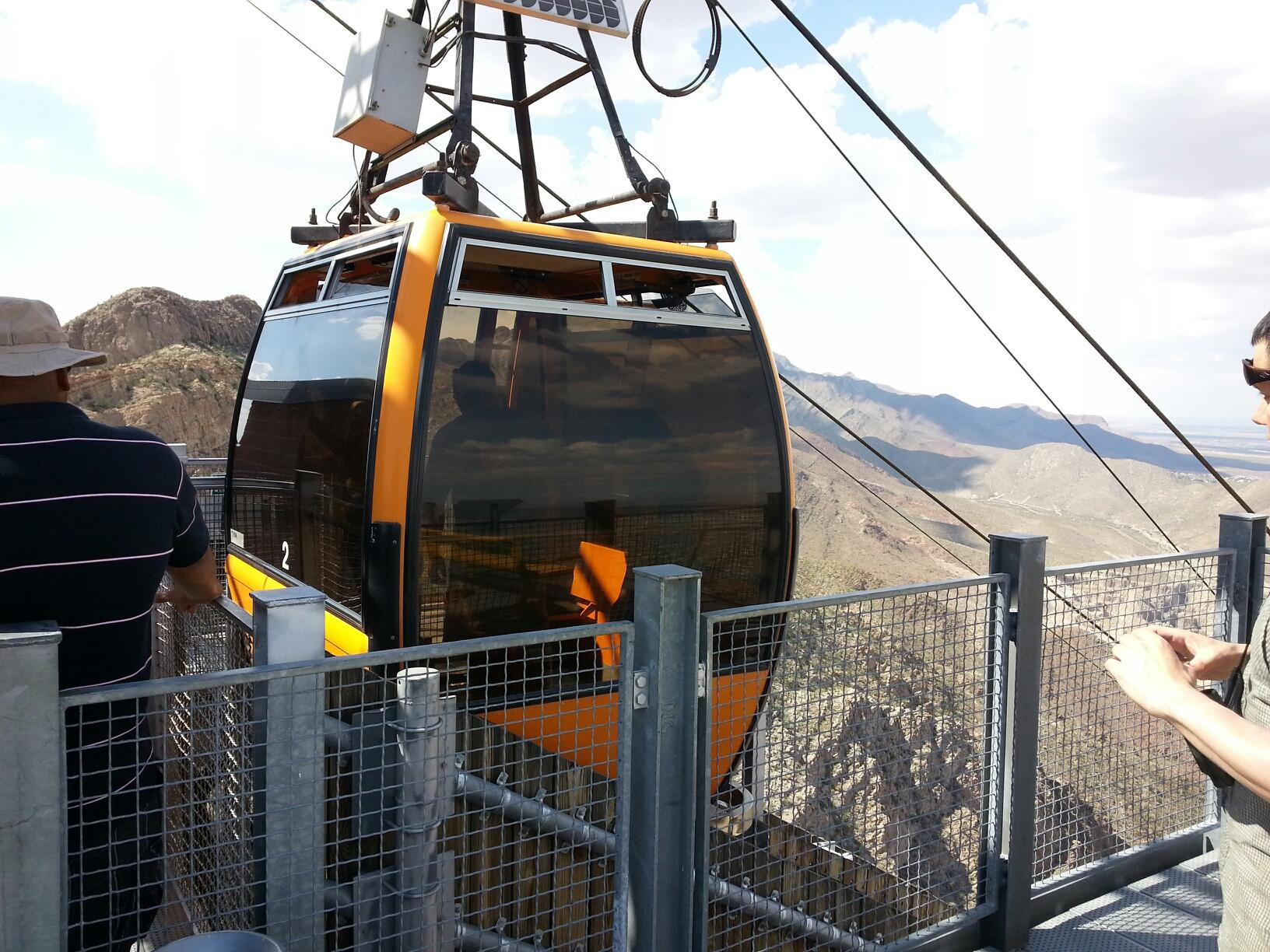
Wyler Aerial Tramway

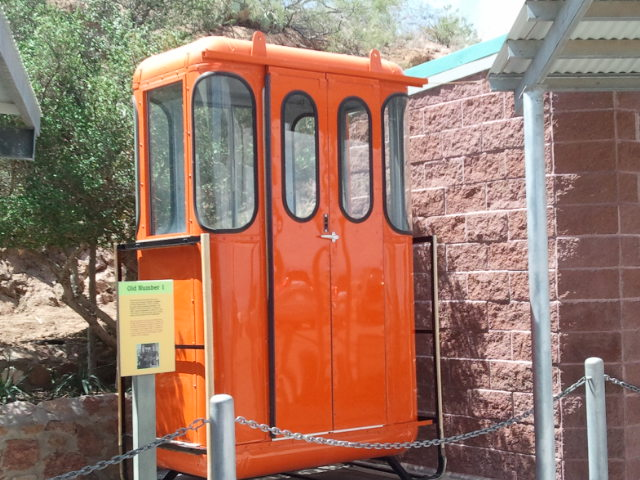
Old Tramway gondola

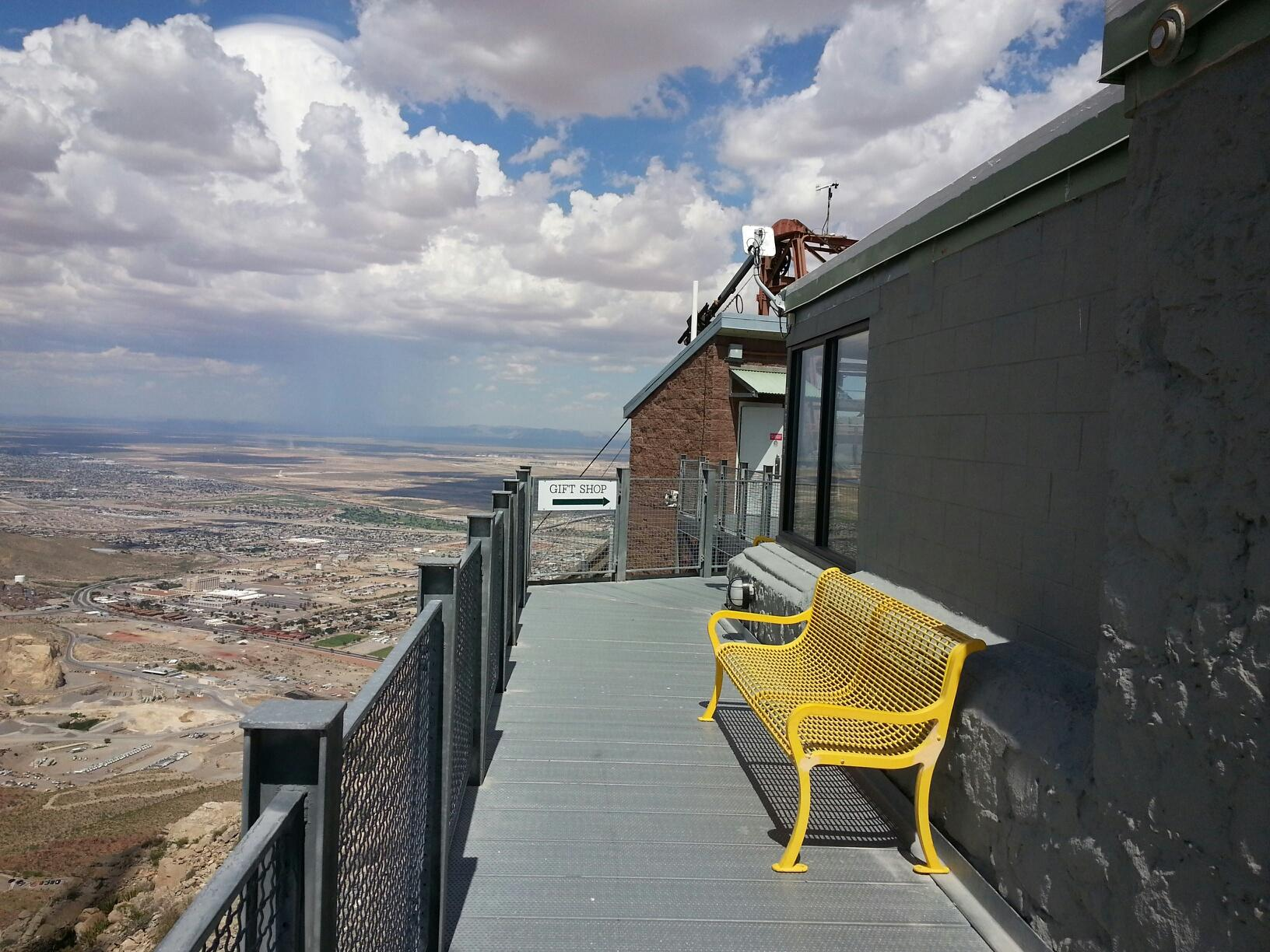
Ranger Peak with a view of Northeast El Paso in the background

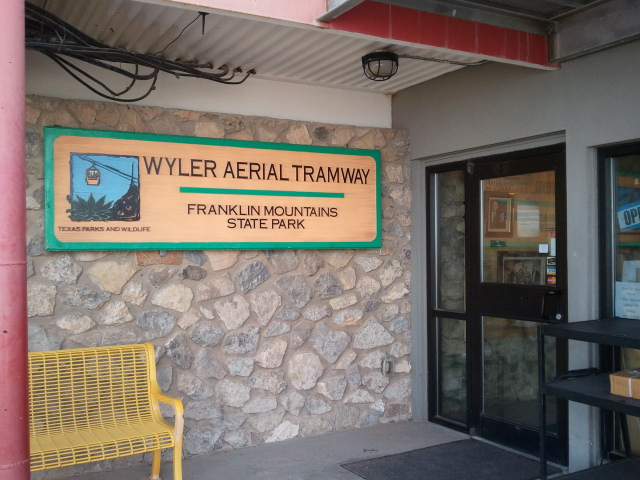
Ranger Peak gift shop

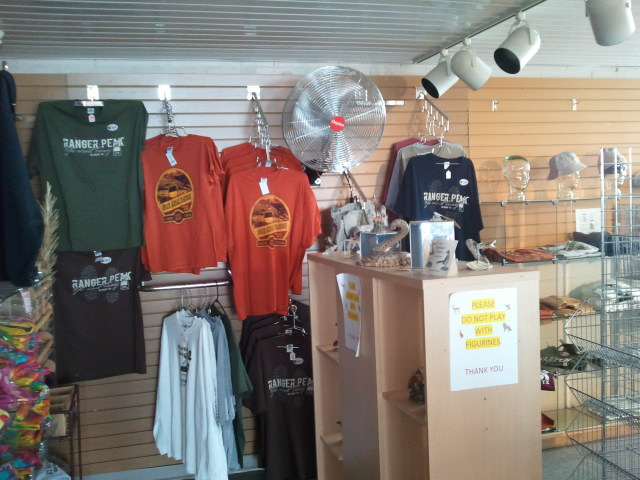
Inside gift shop

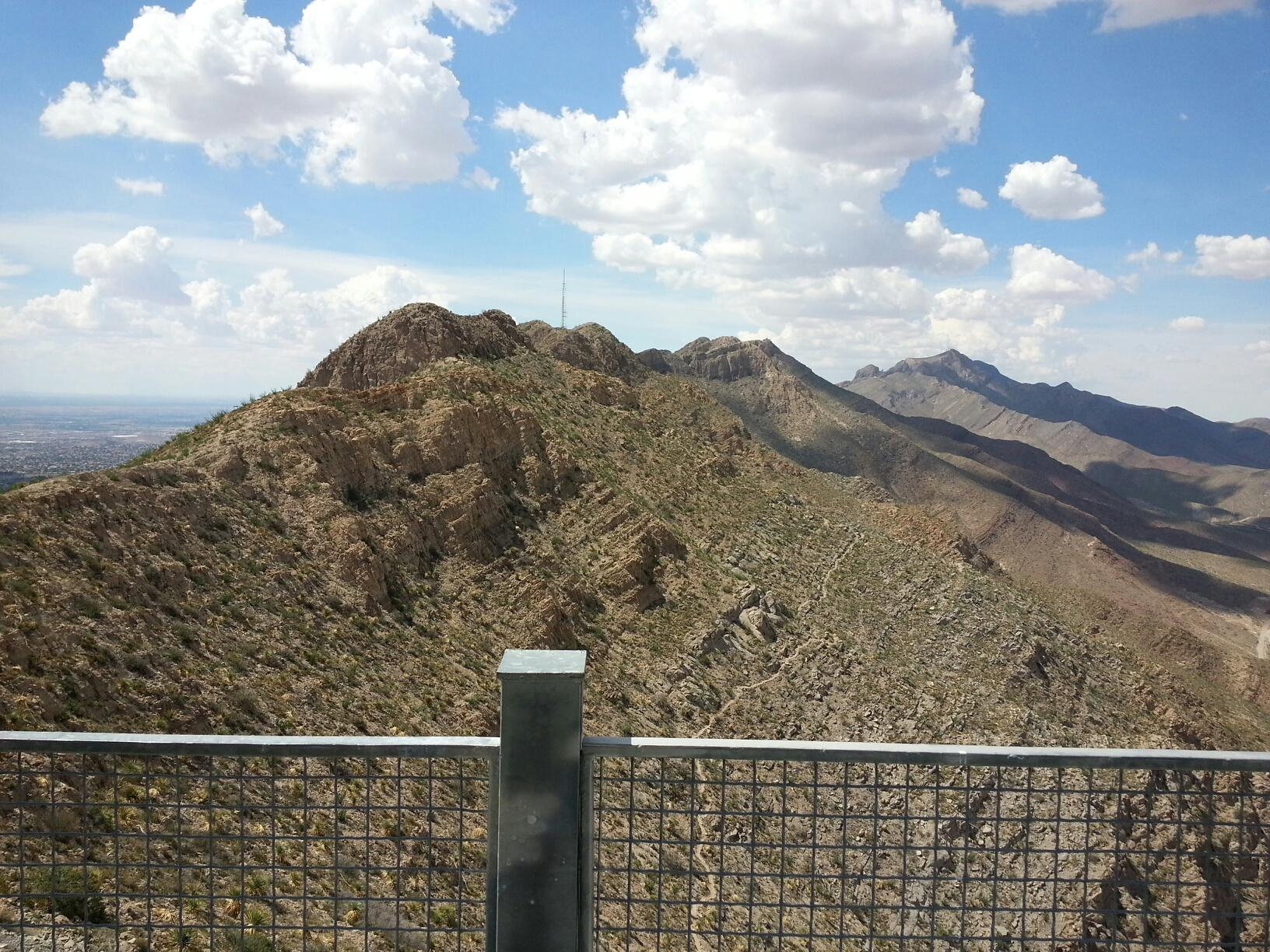
Looking north at the Franklin Mountains from Ranger Peak

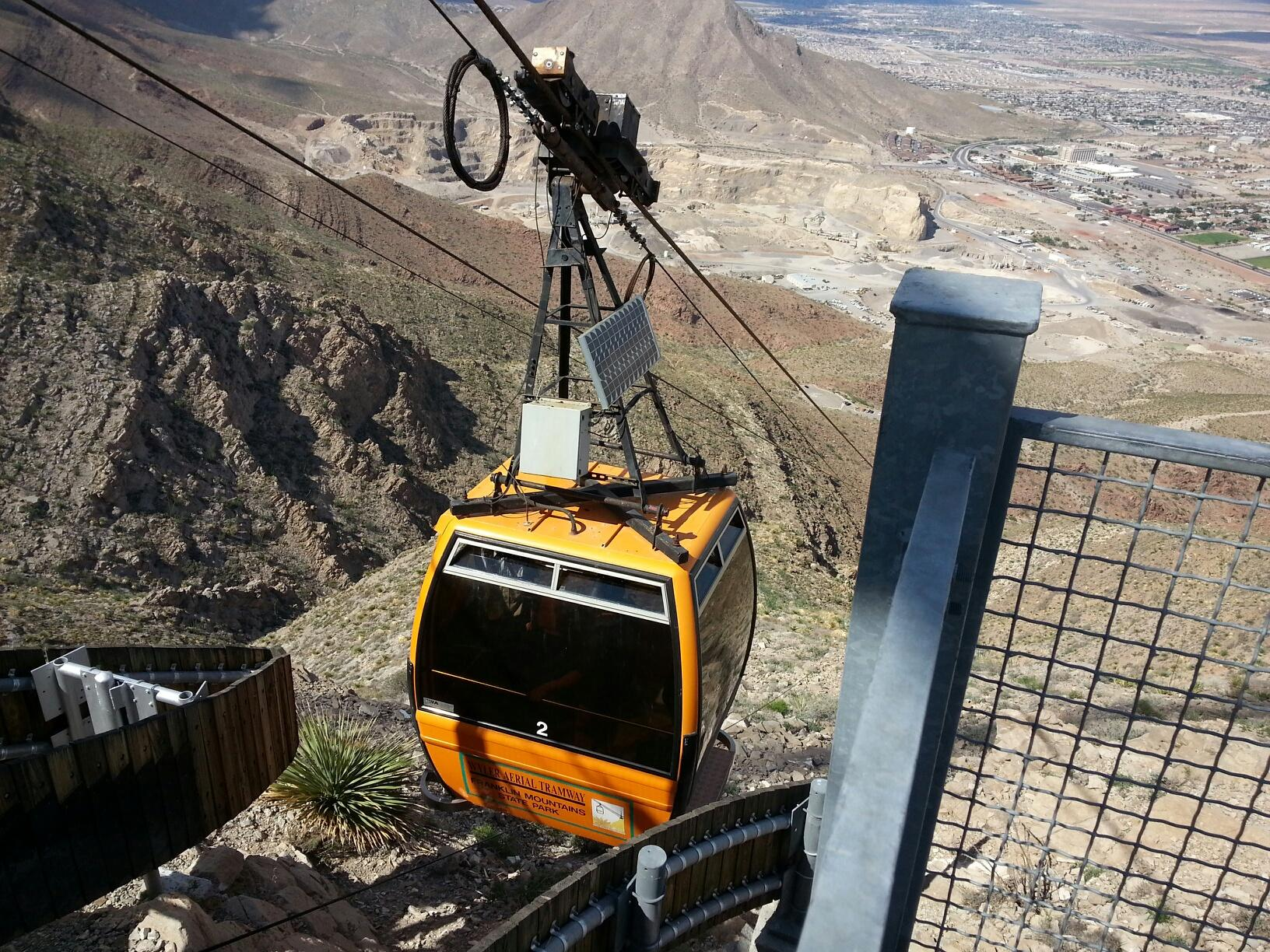
Current gondola

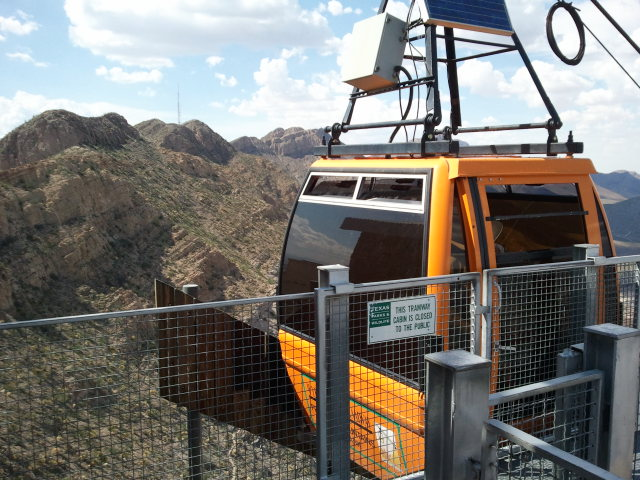
The tramway
