= McKelligon Canyon =

In McKelligon Canyon, looking southeast.

McKelligon Canyon is the location of a 1,503-seat amphitheater located in El Paso, Texas, United States, where the play Viva El Paso! is presented. The amphitheater is also used for concerts, graduation ceremonies, and other special events. Adjacent is the 300-seat McKelligon Canyon Pavilion.

Sugarloaf Mountain stands at the entrance to the Canyon (the mountain is the leftmost peak, pictured in the adjacent image). The peak of Sugarloaf is at 31.82910° N, -106.468054° W.

== Description ==
Soldier running up McKelligon Canyon for his daily endurance training PT

McKelligon Canyon lies on the south eastern side of the Franklin Mountains and surrounded by canyon walls. It is a popular destination known for its rock climbing, hiking, running, walking and biking. Visitors have a variety of rock climbing routes to choose from and the symmetric terrain is filled with crevices and cracks. All hiking trails including the Ron Coleman Trail begin at the end of McKelligon Canyon and are open year-round. McKelligon Canyon is part of the Franklin Mountains State Park and is subject to fees and restrictions from the Texas parks and Wildlife Department.

== History ==
Ownership of the area of McKelligan Canyon was in dispute until El Paso County purchased the land in 1931. The area was named after realtor, M.J. McKelligon, who grazed cattle in the area. The long road into the canyon was built using federal relief funds, included a dam, and cost around $150,000.

In the 1950s, it was rumored that uranium could be found in the canyon, but this turned out to be untrue.
