= Franklin Mountains State Park =

Texas state park in El Paso, Texas

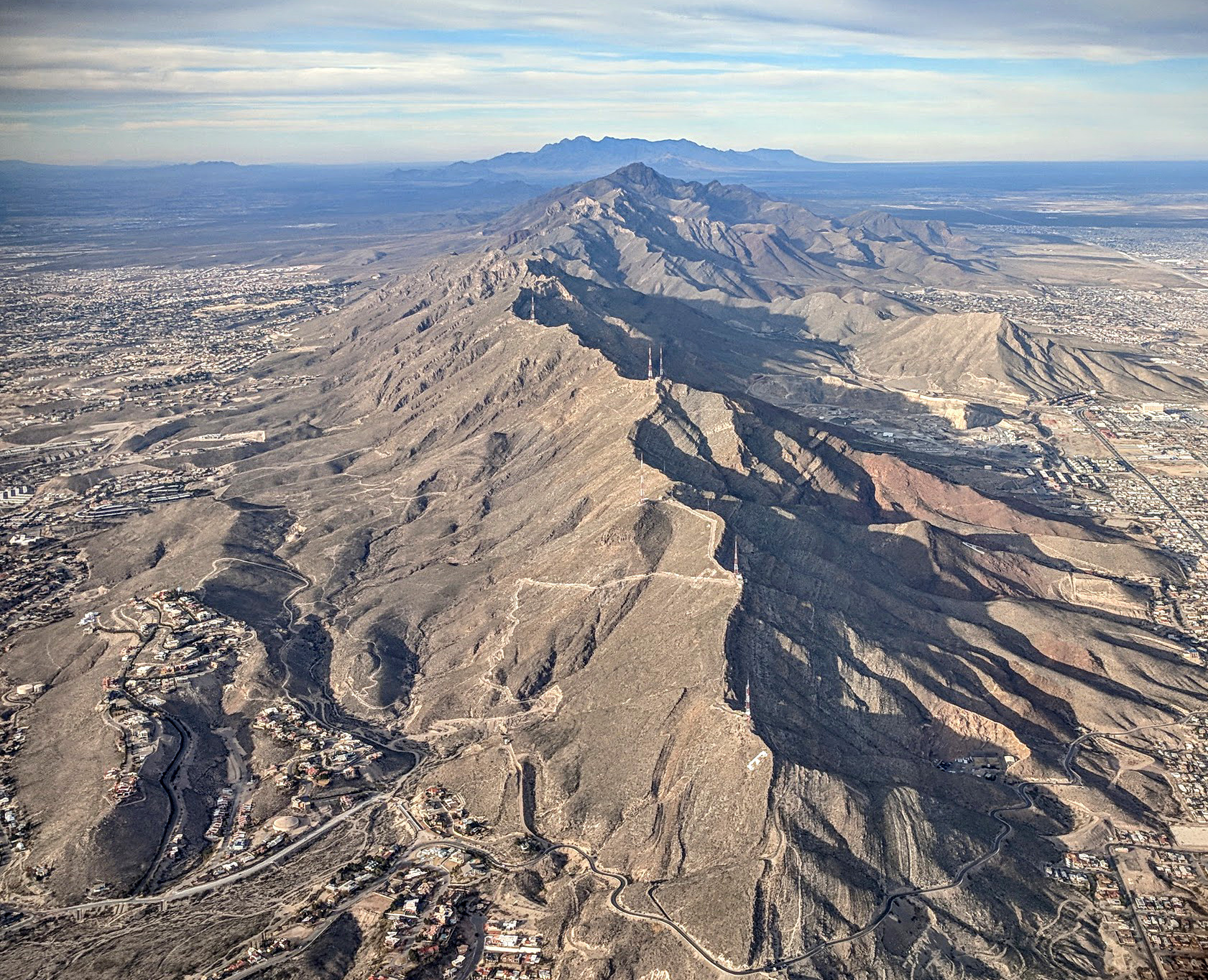

- Location within Texas Location within the United States
- Nearest city: El Paso
- Coordinates: 31°53′01″N 106°30′08″W
- Length: 23 mi (37 km)
- Width: 3 mi (4.8 km)
- Area: 24,247 acres (98.12 km^{2})
- Elevation: 5,426 ft (1,654 m)
- Designated: 1987
- Named for: Benjamin Franklin Coons
- Visitors: 84,185 (in 2025)
- Administrator: Texas Parks and Wildlife

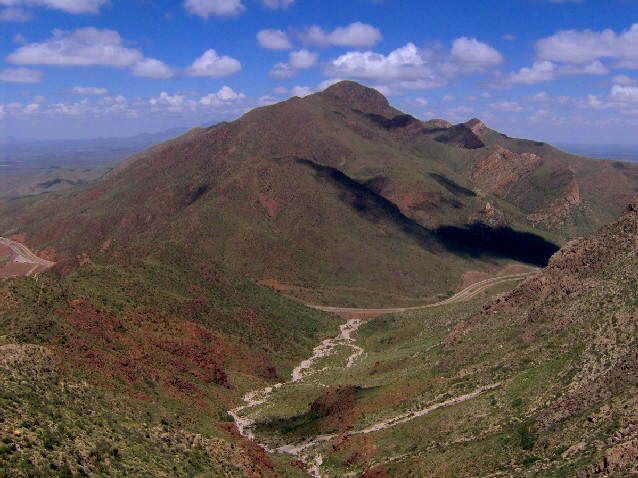
North Franklin Mountain, looking northeast from South Franklin Mountain

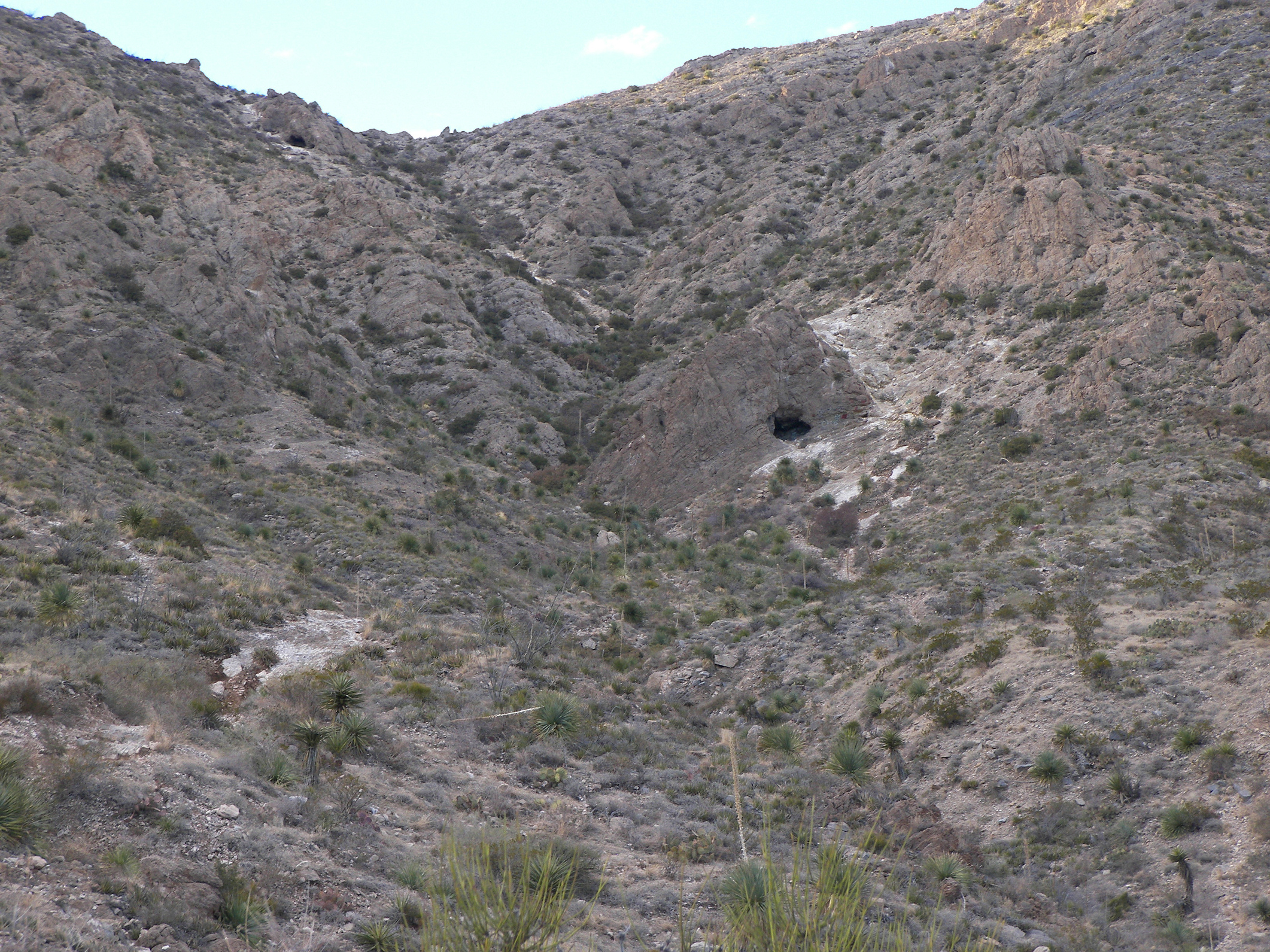
Caves on the Ron Coleman Trail

Franklin Mountains State Park is a state park in El Paso, Texas, United States. The park is named after the Franklin Mountains, a mountainous range that extends 23 mi (37 km) from El Paso to New Mexico. Its headquarters are located at an elevation of 5,426 feet (1,654 m) with the highest peak, North Franklin Mountain, reaching 7,192 feet (2,192 m). Covering 24,247.56 acres (9,813 ha), it is one of the largest urban parks in the U.S. lying completely within city limits. The park is owned and operated by the Texas Parks and Wildlife Department and is open year-round.

== History ==
Native Americans and other travelers have used the natural resources in the Franklin Mountains when crossing the gap between the Franklin Mountains and the Juarez Mountains that is now Ciudad Juárez across the Rio Grande in Mexico and El Paso. Pictograms and mortar pits confirm a human presence in the mountains dating back more than 12,000 years.

The Franklin Mountains are most likely named after Benjamin Franklin Coons, who in 1849 purchased a ranch in what is now El Paso. At first known as Coons Ranch, by 1851 the settlement took on Coons' middle name and was called Franklin. Despite the town being officially named El Paso in 1852, the locals continued to call it Franklin throughout the 1850s.

The El Paso Tin Mining and Smelting Company operated a tin mine on the northeast slope of North Franklin Mountain from 1909 to 1915. While the mine had the distinction of being the only tin mine ever located in the U.S., it was an economic failure.

Efforts to grant protected status to the Franklin Mountains began as early as 1925. A real estate developer sought to build housing on the mountains and in 1979 he built a road up into them. A local organization known as the Wilderness Park Coalition was able to convince the Texas Legislature to protect the mountains in 1979. Despite this success the legislature, in the same bill, prohibited funding for the development, operation and maintenance of the park. The property was formally acquired in 1981. Changes to the legislation were made in 1985 when a plan for park development was established and the park was opened to the public in 1987.

The 1979 establishment allowed for the incorporation of the Castner Range on the east side of the park, though this did not happen due to the presence of unexploded ordnance. After decades pushing for its conservation, the Castner Range National Monument was established in 2023.

In May 2026, 1,054 acres (427 ha) to the east of the park were acquired. The acquisition provides access to the northeastern portion of the park and curbs urban encroachment.

== Geology ==
The Franklin Mountains are 23 miles (37 km) long and 3 miles (4.8 km) wide and stretch from El Paso into New Mexico. The Franklins were formed due to crustal extension related to the Cenozoic Rio Grande rift. Although the present topography of the range and adjoining basins is controlled by extension during rifting in the last 10 million years, faults within the range also record deformation during the Laramide orogeny, between 85 and 45 million years ago.

The Precambrian rocks atop North Franklin Mountain are "the highest geological structure in the state of Texas." The highest peak is North Franklin Mountain at 7,192 feet (2,192 m). North Franklin Peak can be accessed via a trail located east of Mundy's Gap. The mountains are composed primarily of sedimentary rock with some igneous intrusions. Geologists refer to them as tilted-block fault mountains and in them can be found billion-year-old Precambrian rocks, the oldest in Texas.

== Nature ==
Franklin Mountains State Park is part of the Chihuahuan Desert. The plants and wildlife found in the park, despite it being within a city, are typical of those found throughout the rest of the desert.

=== Plants ===
Lechuguilla, Wheeler sotol, ocotillo, banana yucca, soaptree yucca, Torrey's yucca, California poppy, Fishhook barrel cactus, various prickly pear and other cacti are common plants. Trees like Frémont cottonwood, netleaf hackberry, and several species of juniper and oak grow along the springs on the mountain slopes.

=== Animals ===
Mammals in the park include desert bighorn sheep, mule deer, mountain lion, ring-tailed cat, coyote, Texas antelope squirrel, and a variety of rodents. Birds observed at the park included golden eagle, ash-throated flycatcher, pyrrhuloxia, owl, hawk, and a wide variety of smaller birds like the calliope hummingbird.

== Recreation ==
Franklin Mountains State Park offers recreational activities such as hiking, mountain biking, picnicking, and scenic driving. Development of the park is limited and much of the land is far from paved access roads and parking areas. Two hiking trails can be accessed from Woodrow Bean Transmountain Drive. Plans for a network of 100 miles (160 km) of hiking trails are under consideration. Rock climbing is permitted in the park and well established climbing areas are located in McKelligon Canyon The park headquarters is also located in McKelligon Canyon. Five camping areas are found in the Tom Mays Unit of the park with picnic facilities.

The Wyler Aerial Tramway is an aerial tramway operated by the Texas Parks and Wildlife Department and is located in the Franklin Mountains State Park. The tram is closed to public as of Sept. 2018. The tramway complex covers 196 acres (0.79 km^{2}) on the east side of the Franklin Mountains. The gondolas travel along two 2600 foot 1 3/8" diameter steel cables to Ranger Peak, 5,632 feet (1,717 m) above sea level. The trip takes about four minutes and lifts riders up 940 vertical feet above the boarding area.

== Climate ==
The climate type of Franklin Mountains State Park belongs to the hot-summer mediterranean climate (Köppen: Csa), which is close to cold semi-arid climate (Köppen: BSk). Unlike the desert climate of downtown El Paso, the state park is located at a higher altitude in the mountains, which can intercept a large amount of moisture from the air, thereby forming precipitation.

Climate data for North Franklin Mountain, 1991–2020 normals
Month	Jan	Feb	Mar	Apr	May	Jun	Jul	Aug	Sep	Oct	Nov	Dec	Year
Mean daily maximum °F (°C)	52.8 (11.6)	54.8 (12.7)	61.1 (16.2)	68.9 (20.5)	77.4 (25.2)	86.9 (30.5)	85.9 (29.9)	83.6 (28.7)	78.7 (25.9)	70.6 (21.4)	60.3 (15.7)	53.2 (11.8)	69.5 (20.8)
Daily mean °F (°C)	42.0 (5.6)	43.5 (6.4)	49.2 (9.6)	56.0 (13.3)	64.6 (18.1)	73.9 (23.3)	73.8 (23.2)	72.2 (22.3)	67.3 (19.6)	58.7 (14.8)	49.1 (9.5)	42.5 (5.8)	57.7 (14.3)
Mean daily minimum °F (°C)	31.2 (−0.4)	32.3 (0.2)	37.2 (2.9)	43.1 (6.2)	51.9 (11.1)	60.8 (16.0)	61.8 (16.6)	60.9 (16.1)	55.9 (13.3)	46.8 (8.2)	37.9 (3.3)	31.8 (−0.1)	46.0 (7.8)
Average precipitation inches (mm)	0.61 (15)	0.53 (13)	0.39 (9.9)	0.42 (11)	0.46 (12)	0.72 (18)	4.25 (108)	2.27 (58)	2.17 (55)	0.86 (22)	0.71 (18)	1.32 (34)	14.71 (373.9)
Average dew point °F (°C)	18.2 (−7.7)	17.0 (−8.3)	17.8 (−7.9)	18.3 (−7.6)	24.9 (−3.9)	35.0 (1.7)	48.2 (9.0)	50.1 (10.1)	44.8 (7.1)	32.9 (0.5)	23.4 (−4.8)	20.0 (−6.7)	29.2 (−1.5)
Source: PRISM Climate Group

== Gallery ==
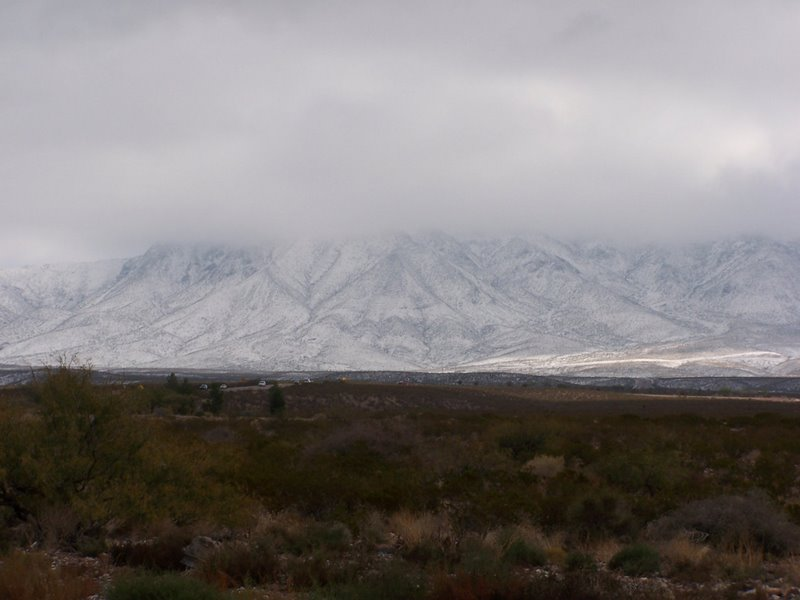
Franklin Mountain Snow

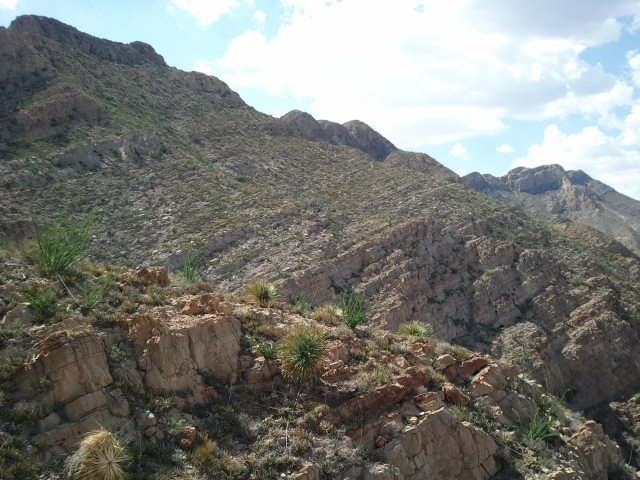
Eastern side of the Franklin Mountains by Ranger Peak

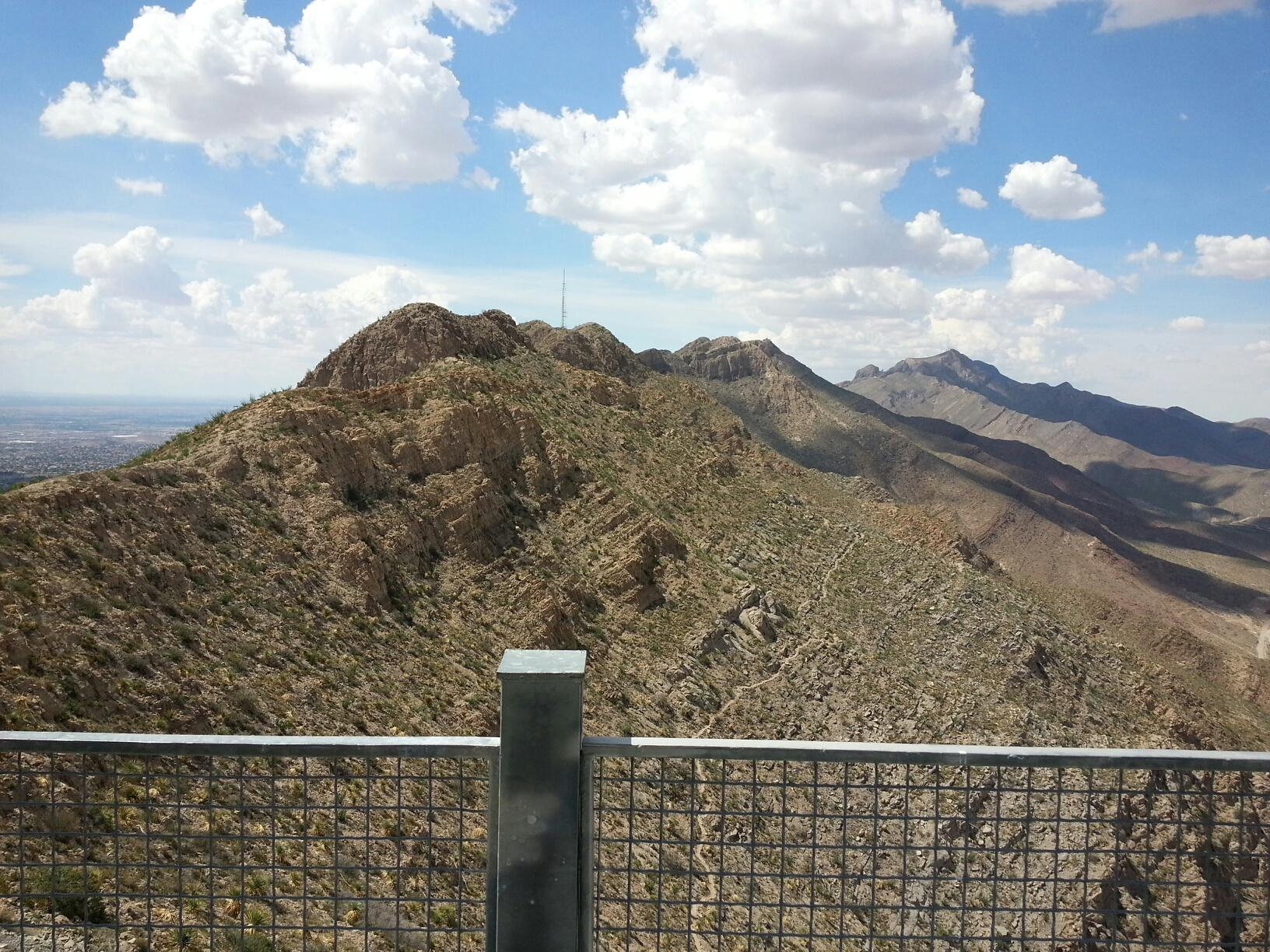
Looking north from Ranger Peak

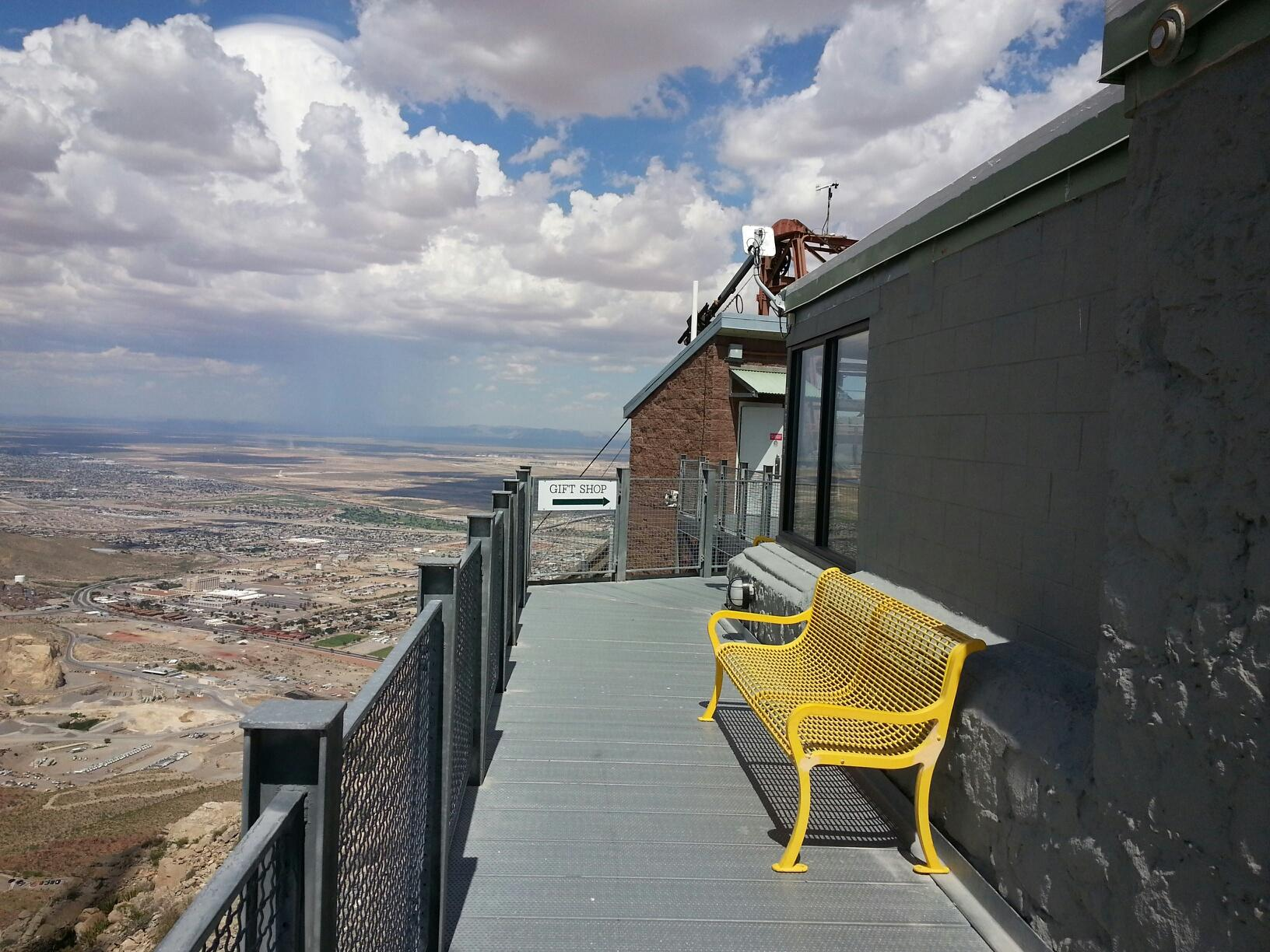
Ranger Peak

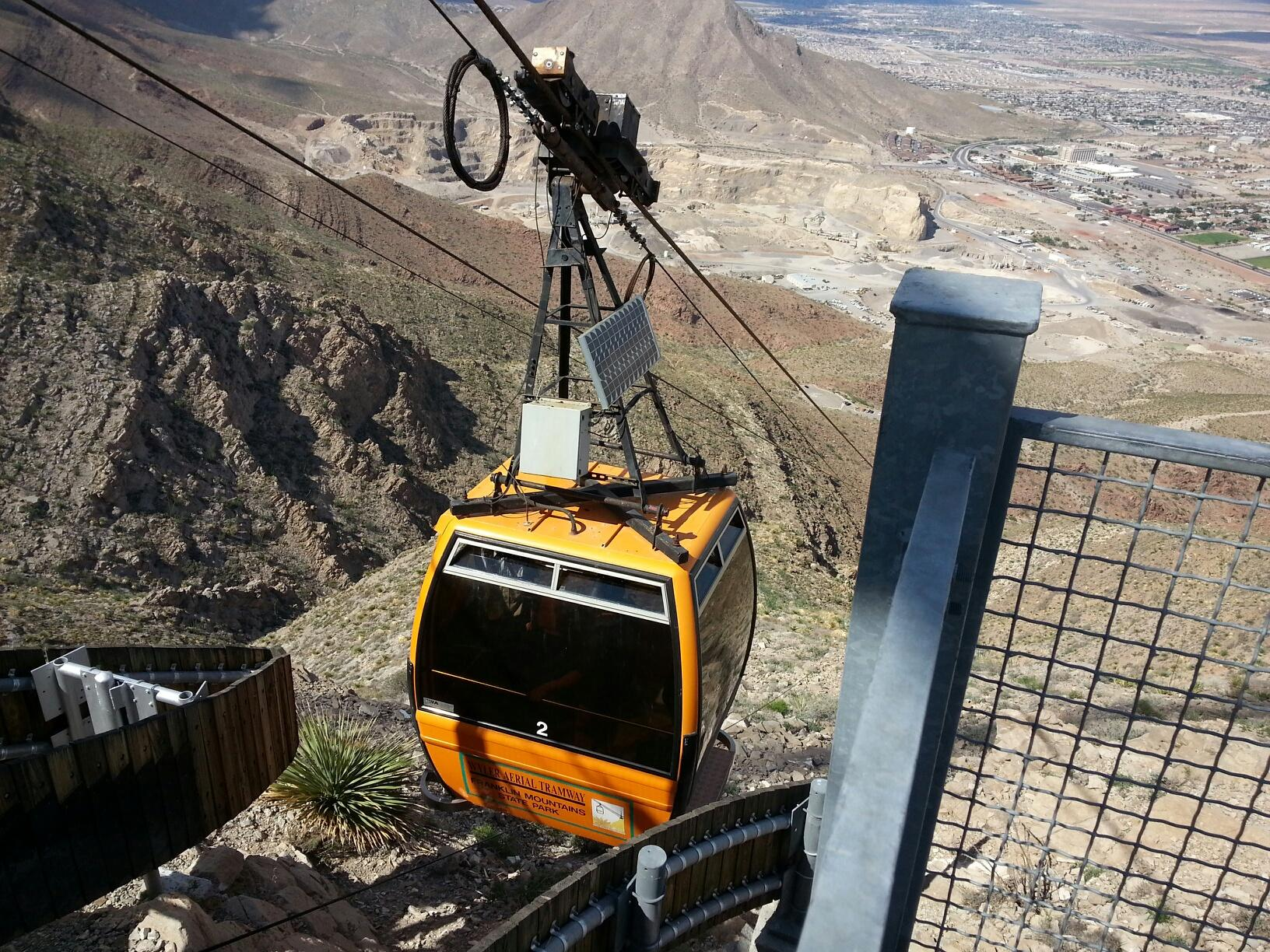
Wyler Aerial Tramway

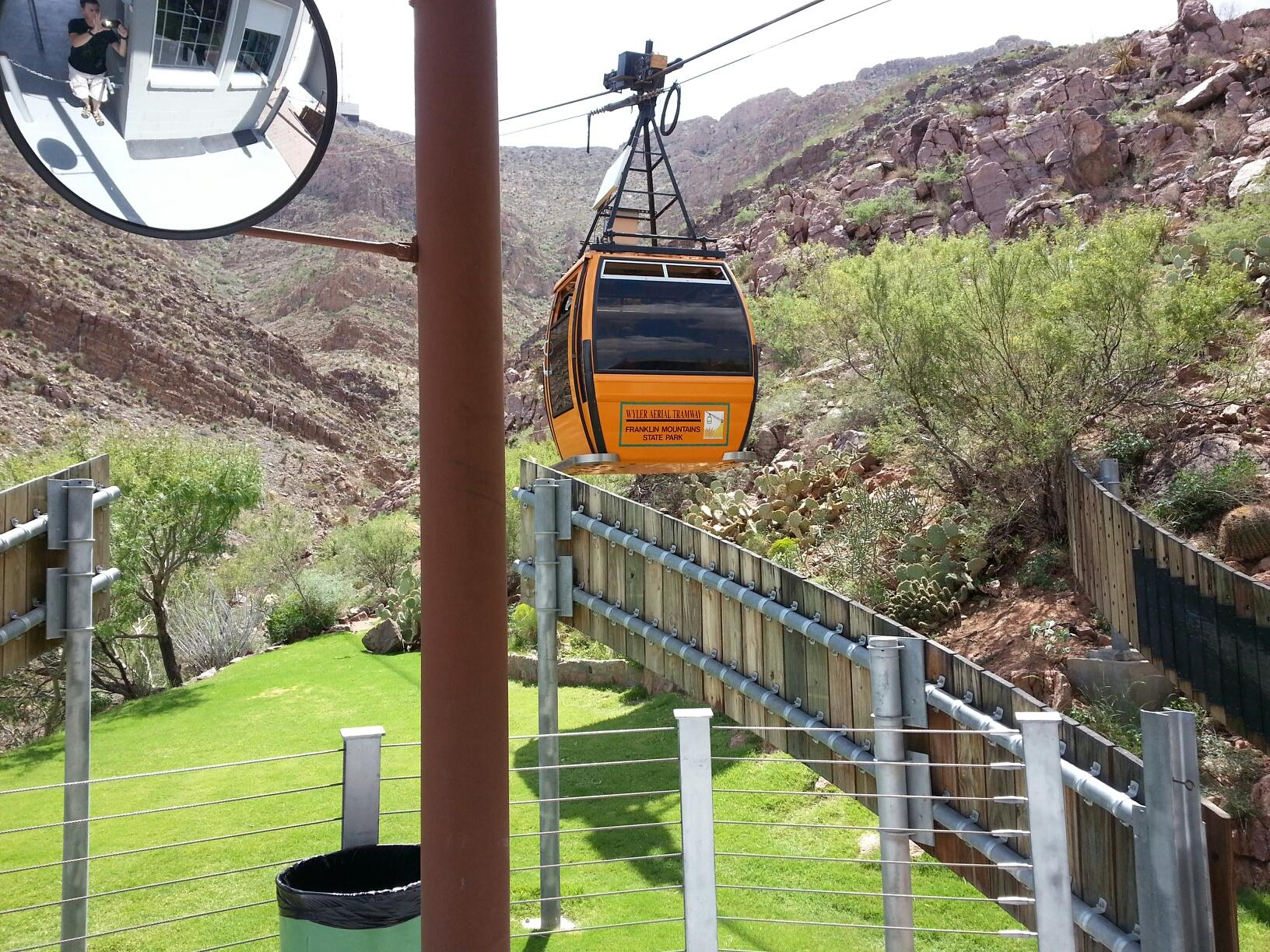
Wyler Aerial Tramway

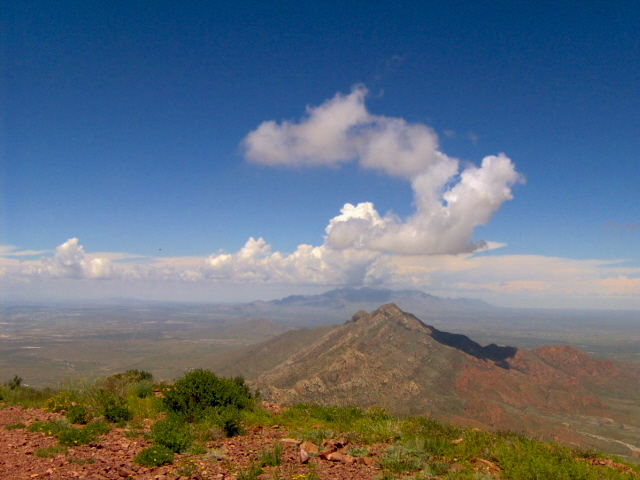
North Franklin Mountain

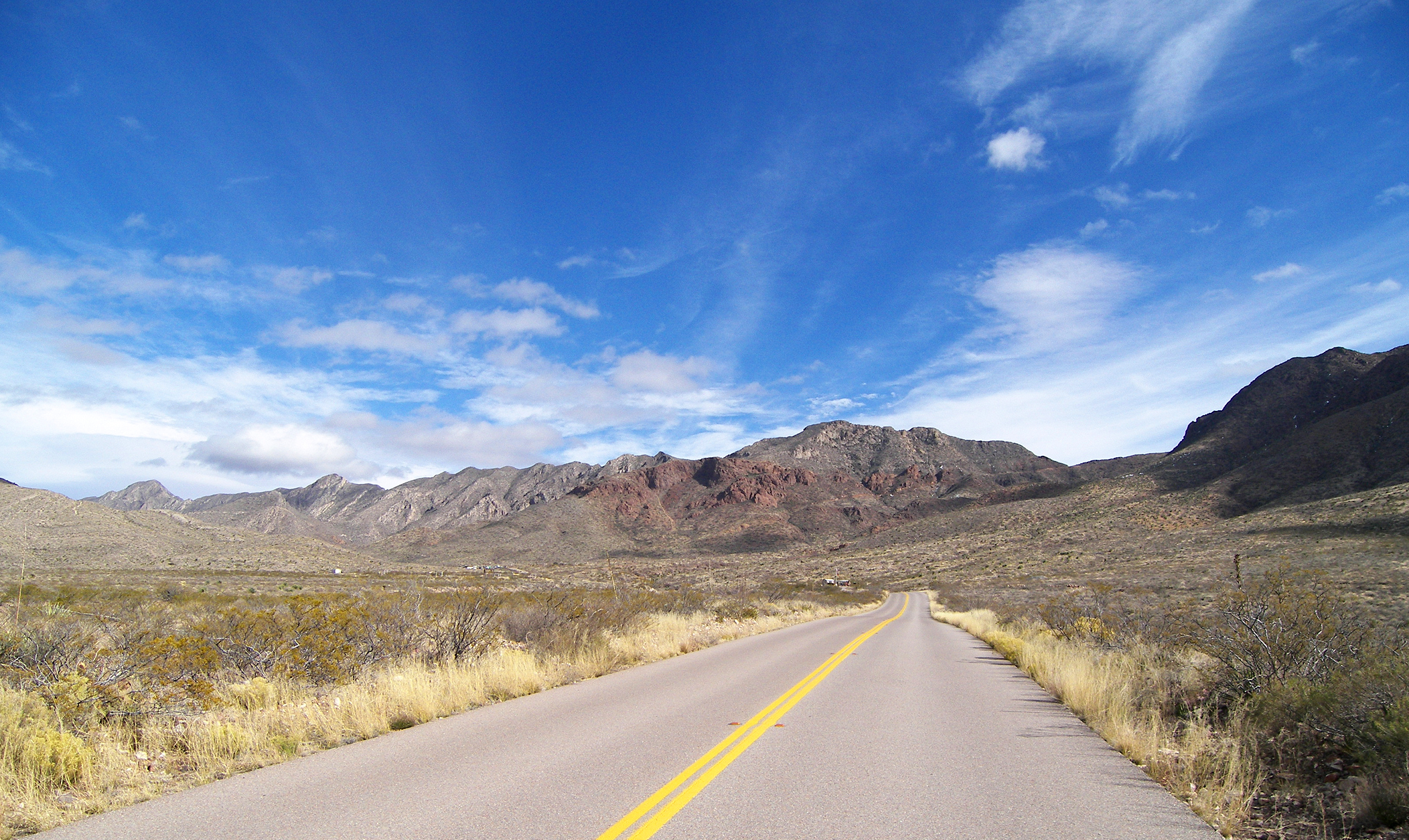
Entrance to Tom Mays unit

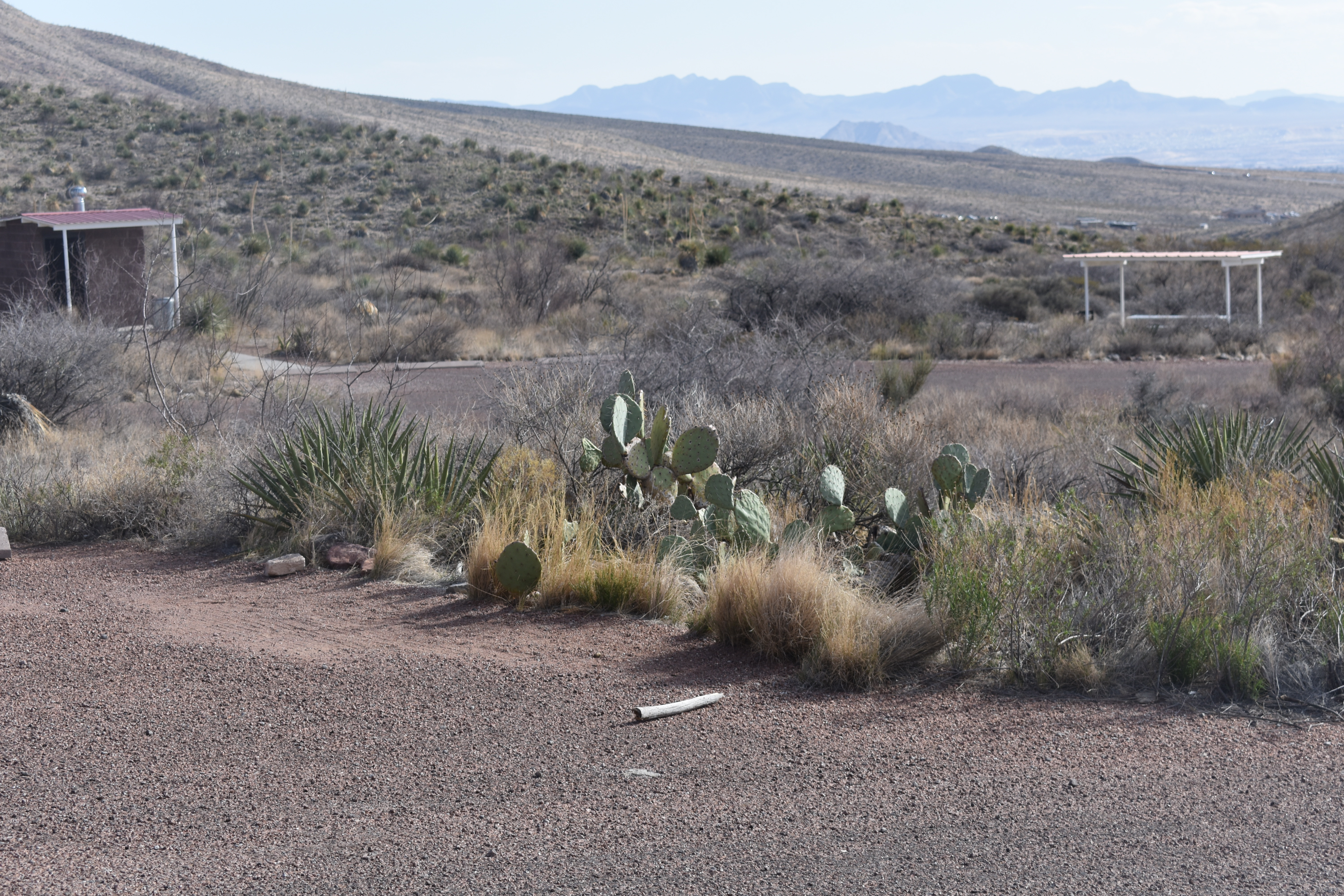
Prickly pear cactus in the Tom Mays unit
