= Franklin Mountains (Texas) =

Small mountain range in El Paso, Texas, US

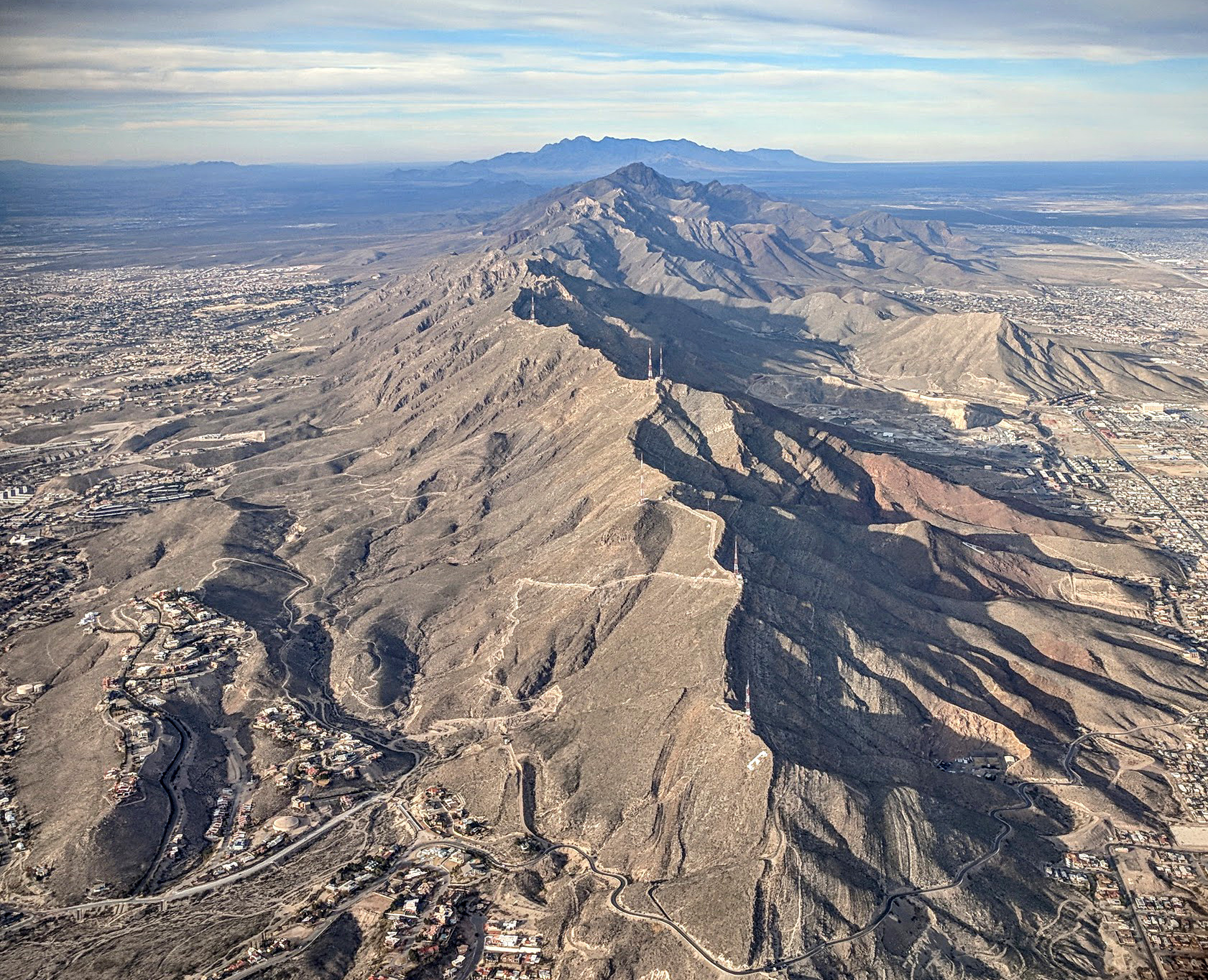
- Aerial view of the Franklin Mountains from the south, with El Paso's Scenic Drive at the bottom, and New Mexico's Organ Mountains on the horizon in the distance

Highest point
- Peak: North Franklin Peak
- Elevation: 7,192 ft (2,192 m)
- Coordinates: 31°54′10″N 106°29′36″W

Geography
- Country: United States
- States: Texas; New Mexico

Geology
- Orogeny: Laramide orogeny
- Rock age: Cretaceous
- Rock type(s): Sedimentary, Igneous

The Franklin Mountains of Texas (Spanish: Sierras de los Mansos) are a small range 23 miles (37 km) long, 3 miles (5 km) wide that extend from El Paso, Texas, north into New Mexico. The Franklins were formed due to crustal extension related to the Cenozoic Rio Grande rift. Although the present topography of the range and adjoining basins is controlled by extension during rifting in the last 10 million years, faults within the range also record deformation during the Laramide orogeny, between 85 and 45 million years ago.

The highest peak is North Franklin Peak at 7,192 feet (2,192 m). Much of the range is part of the Franklin Mountains State Park. The mountains are composed primarily of sedimentary rock with some igneous intrusions. Geologists refer to them as tilted-block fault mountains and in them can be found 1.25 billion-year-old Precambrian rocks, the oldest in Texas.

== Gallery ==
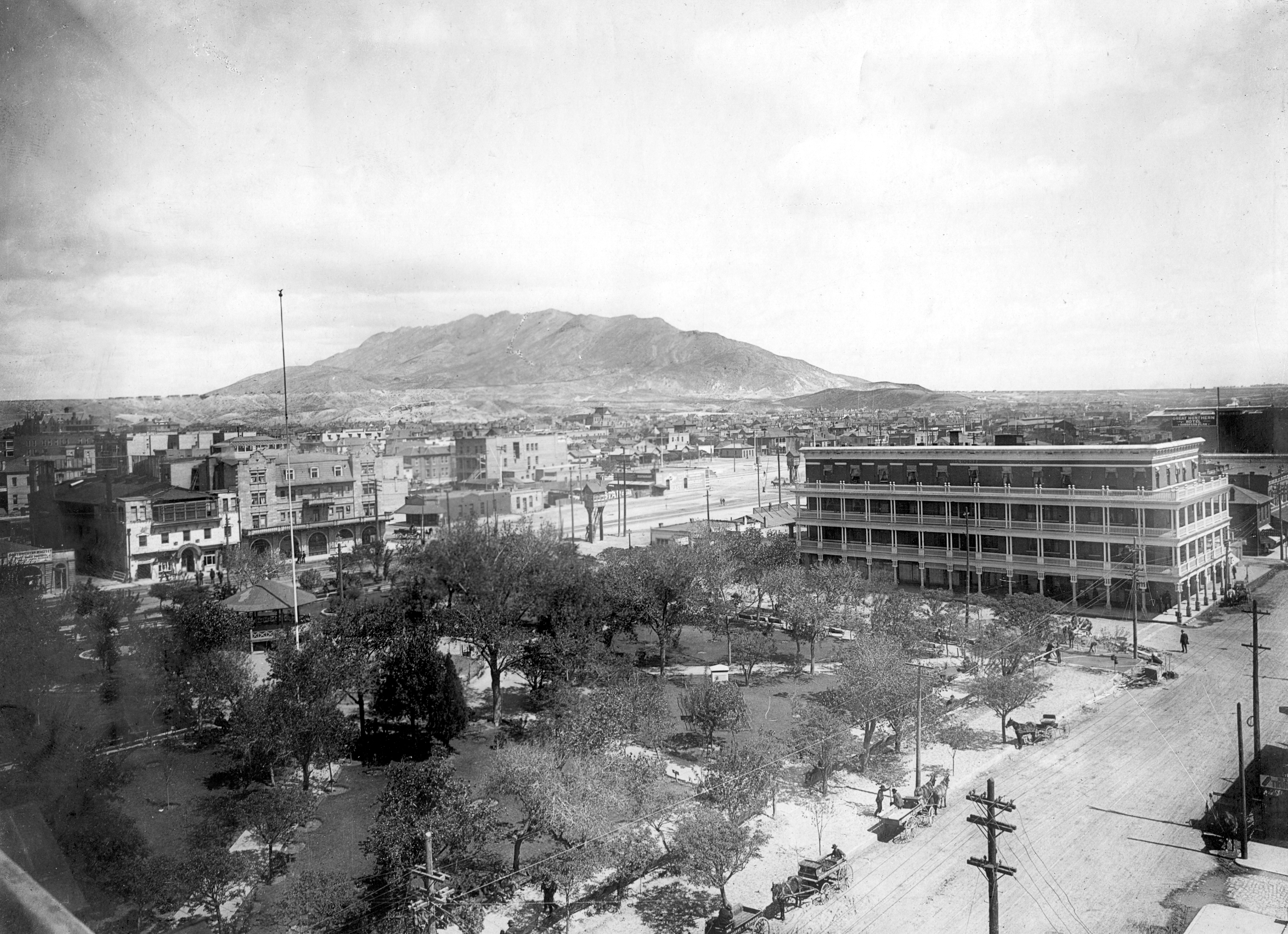
View of the south end of Franklin Mountains from El Paso, showing the abrupt termination of the range, its westward dip slope and terraced bolson deposits on each side. (1908)

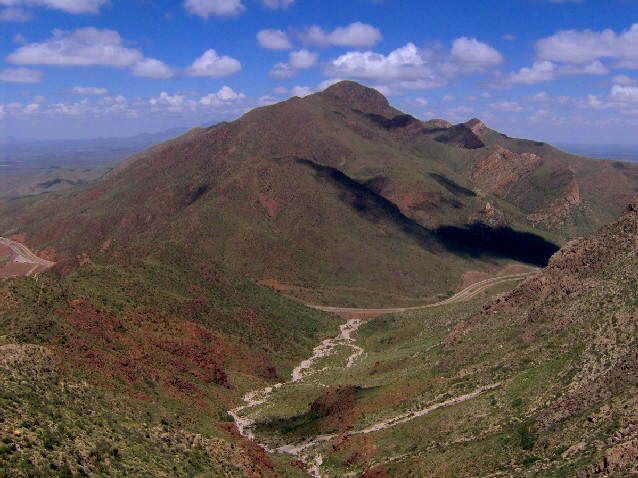
North Franklin Peak, looking northeast from South Franklin Mountain

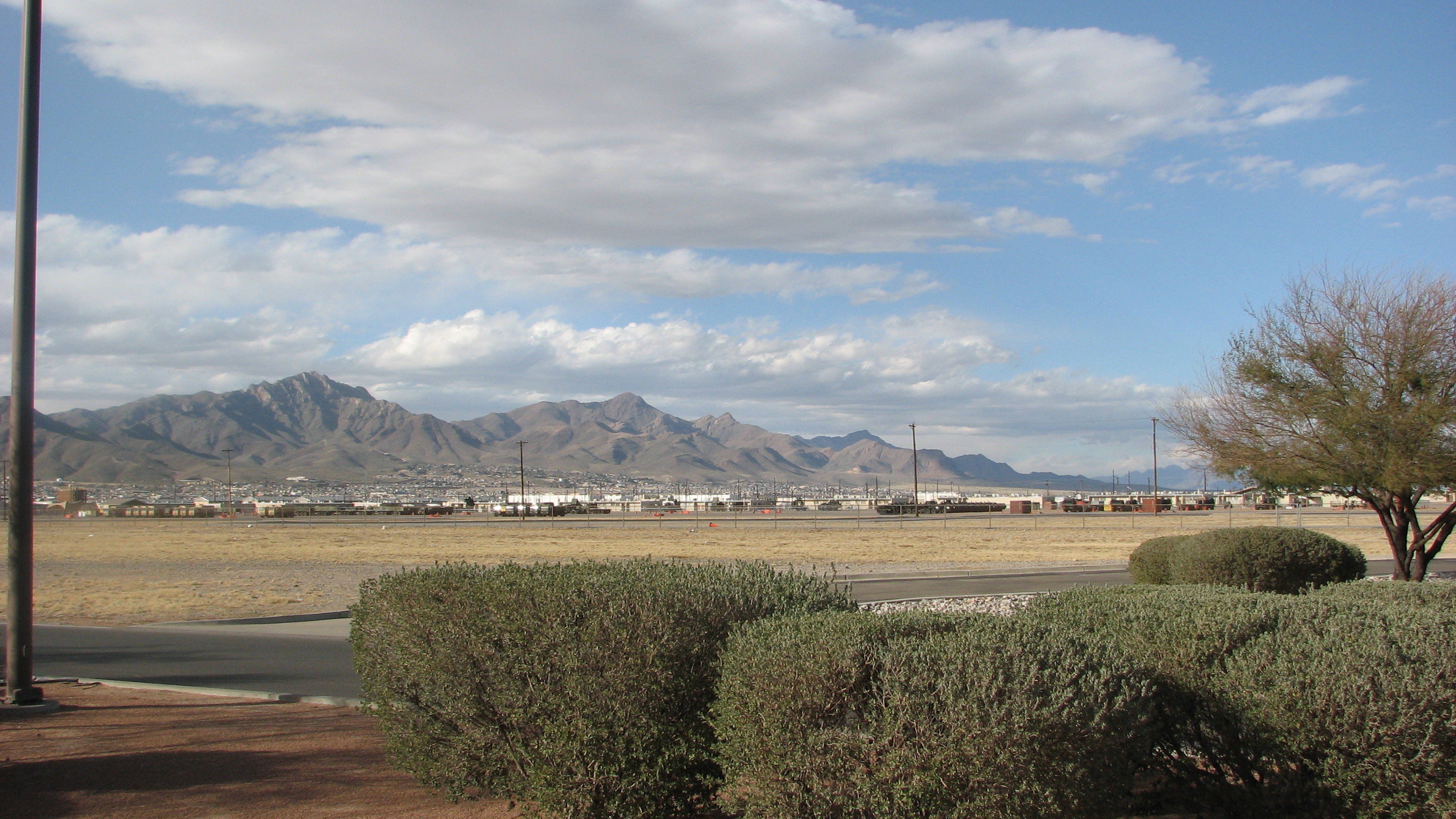
South and North Franklin mountains, shown left to right, El Paso, Texas, as seen from Fort Bliss. The Organ Mountains can be glimpsed to the north, in the right part of the image.

View of South Franklin Mountain (aka Mount Franklin) (29 March 2009)

== See also ==
- Beach Mountains
- Chihuahuan Desert
- Davis Mountains
- Guadalupe Mountains
- McKittrick Canyon
- Trans-Pecos
