= Culture of El Paso =

The culture of El Paso, Texas is influenced both heavily by American and Mexican cultures due to its position as a border town, its large Hispanic population, and its history as part of the Southwest, Spanish America and Mexico. El Paso is home to a number of cultural events and festivals. El Paso also hosts various theaters, museums, and other cultural sites.

== Annual cultural events and festivals ==
=== Amigo Airsho ===
Amigo Airsho is one of El Paso's premier events, and is ranked as one of the top ten air shows in the country. The show is filled with air entertainment and ground activities. Acts include the Franklin's Flying Circus, where performers walk on the wings of an airborne plane. Ground activities include the Jet Powered School Bus. After 31 years of being held at Biggs Army Airfield, the show will move to Dona Ana Airport in 2014.

=== KLAQ Great River Raft Race ===
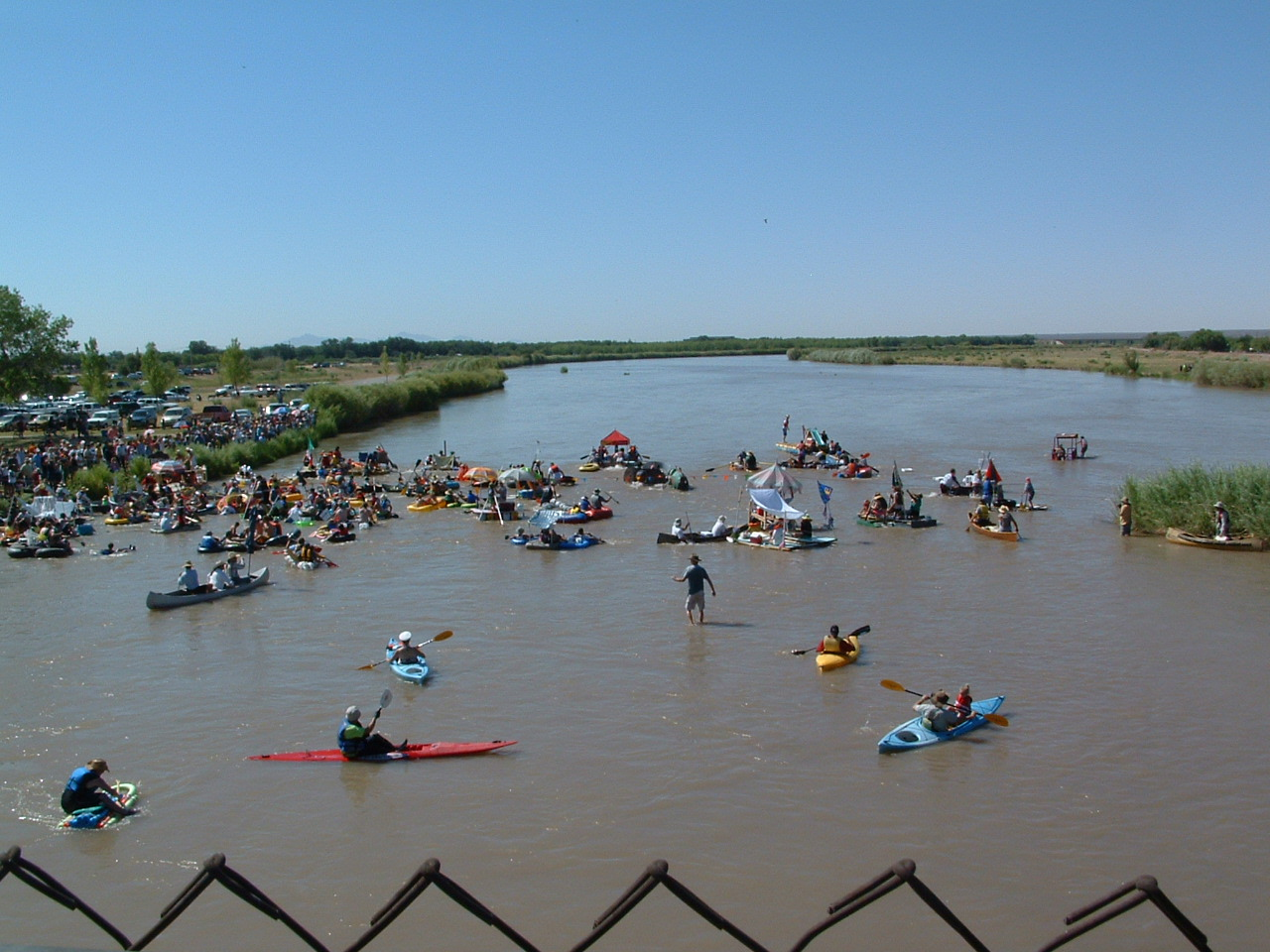
The Great River Raft Race held annually on the Rio Grande in El Paso's upper valley

The KLAQ Great River Raft Race is an annual event celebrated on the second to last Saturday of June. Participants are encouraged to ride the river and float the Rio Grande with family and friends. The organizers encourage the building of unique rafts that will get you down the river with prizes and trophies awarded for the most points earned, best looking crew, and best decorated raft. The race starts at the Vinton bridge and ends three miles downstream at the Canutillo bridge.

=== Southwestern International PRCA Rodeo ===
The Southwestern International PRCA Rodeo is the 17th oldest rodeo in the nation and El Paso's longest running sporting event. Consistently ranked as one of the top 50 shows in the country by the Professional Rodeo Cowboys Association, this charitable event is a celebration of western culture and heritage.

=== Fiesta de las Flores ===
Fiesta de las Flores is the oldest Hispanic festival in the Southwest. The three-day fiesta is held each year during the Labor Day weekend and emphasizes El Paso's Hispanic heritage and culture. The festival attracts 20,000 to 30,000 visitors from El Paso County, New Mexico, West Texas and the state of Chihuahua, Mexico. Activities included in the fiesta are crowning of the queen, a fiesta parade, senior appreciation dance, military appreciation ay, and live entertainment. The fiesta is also well known for the authentic regional cuisine, arts and craft wares, games, and services available for the enjoyment of all segments of the attendees. Over 80 booths, sponsored by local vendors and nonprofit organizations create the Hispanic ambience and culture.

=== Neon Desert Music Festival ===
The annual Neon Desert Music Festival is a two-day event usually held on the last Saturday and Sunday of May on five stages in downtown El Paso stretching from San Jacinto Plaza to Cleveland Square. The festival brings over 30 acts from the worlds of indie rock, Latin and electronic dance music.

=== The Texas Showdown Festival ===
The Texas Showdown Festival is an annual event celebrating musicians and tattoo artists under one roof. Dubbed as the world's largest tattoo and musical festival, the event is held usually the last weekend of July at the El Paso County Coliseum.

=== Sun City Music Festival ===
The only El Paso musical festival not held downtown; instead it is held at Ascarate Park. The Sun City Music Festival is a two-day event dubbed as the largest electronic dance music festival in Texas.

=== Plaza Classic Film Festival ===
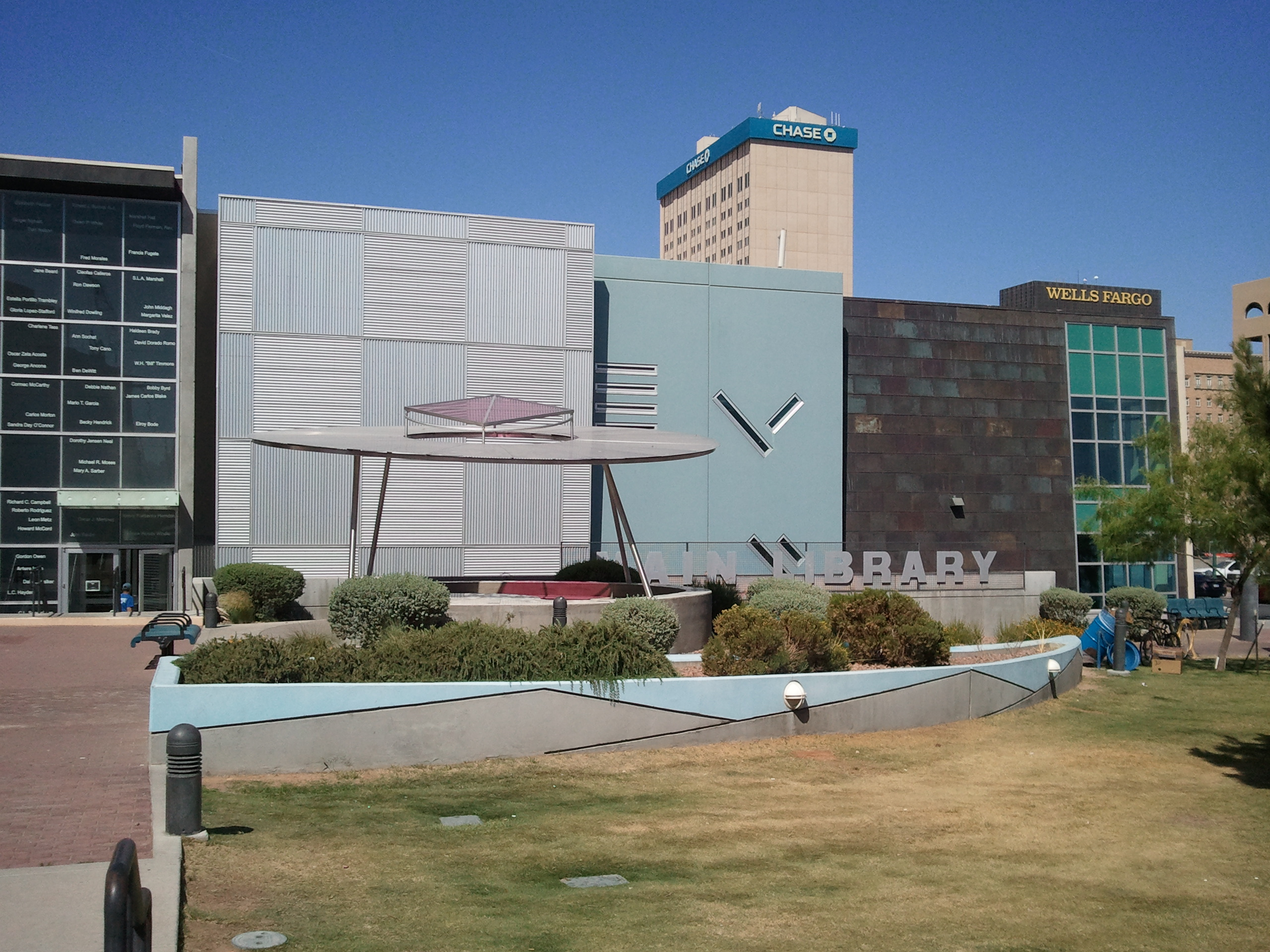
Cleveland Square in downtown El Paso is where many of the festivals are held annually.

The Plaza Classic Film Festival is the world's largest festival dedicated to classic cinema. All classic films are shown at the El Paso Plaza Theater during the first week of August.

=== El Paso Balloonfest ===
The El Paso Balloonfest is an annual event celebrated on Memorial Day weekend and is self described as "3 days of hot air balloons filling the El Paso skies, 3 afternoons of concerts and fun in the sun at Wet N' Wild Waterworld in Anthony, Texas." Over 60 balloons take to the air annually from TFCU launch field which is adjacent to the water park. After the balloons launch, visitors have a weekend of water rides, swimming, concerts, and grilling. The concert aspect of the event features local bands, starting at noon, and different headlining artists in the afternoon. Overnight camping has been added for 2014.

=== El Paso Downtown Street Festival ===
The annual El Paso Downtown Street Festival is held during the last weekend of June in downtown El Paso near the El Paso Convention center. It is the oldest musical festival in the city and brings local, regional and nationally known acts.

=== Music Under the Stars ===
The outdoor concert series, started in 1983, is held annually at the Chamizal National Memorial and draws over 60,000 attendees. It features local and international performers with musical genres ranging from Classical, Country, Tejano, rock and others. The evening concerts are showcased every Sunday afternoon and start in early June and end in the middle of August.

=== Cool Canyon Nights ===
A free summer concert series which takes place outdoors at the McKelligon Canyon Amphitheater on Thursday nights May–July.

=== Alfresco Fridays ===
A free concert series at the downtown Convention Center Plaza featuring Jazz, Latin, Reggae, Classic Rock, Salsa, Funk, and Mariachis on Fridays May–September.

=== ChucoTown Comedy Festival ===
The ChucoTown Comedy Festival is the first comedy festival established in the El Paso region, bringing together comedy enthusiasts to celebrate in downtown El Paso. Launched in 2024, the festival showcases a diverse lineup of local comedians and headlining acts from across the country. Founded by ChucoTown Comedy, the festival is the culmination of a year-round production of comedy shows, building anticipation and support within the local and regional comedy community.

== Performing arts ==
=== El Paso Playhouse ===
El Paso's longest running theater in entering now into its 54th Season. Located at 2501 Montana near El Paso's Five Points area, the Playhouse performs a variety of favorite popular plays year-round. When productions are running, performances are held Fridays and Saturdays at 8:00 pm with Sunday matinees at 2:00 pm.

=== Viva! El Paso ===
The outdoor musical extravaganza Viva! El Paso is performed in the McKelligon Canyon Amphitheatre. It is locally produced and chronicles the 400-year history and cultural evolution of the El Paso region. The show is performed each Friday and Saturday night in June, July, and August. Viva! El Paso has entertained local residents and out-of-town visitors for over 35 years.

=== El Paso Symphony Orchestra ===
The El Paso Symphony was established in the 1930s, it is the oldest performing arts organization in El Paso and the longest continuously running symphony orchestra in the state of Texas. It has received both national and international recognition as a result of its very successful tours of Germany in 1996 and Turkey in 2000, and continues to represent the El Paso region with pride and distinction. The El Paso Symphony Orchestra Association season is anchored by 12 classical concerts. Special events serve as outreach toward new audiences.

=== Broadway in El Paso ===
Broadway in El Paso at the Plaza Theater presents Broadway shows including Wicked, Jersey Boys, Rock of Ages, Mamma Mia!, and many other performances.

=== UTEP Dinner Theater ===
UTEP Dinner Theater history includes 30 years and over 130 productions. Past productions include Annie, Evita, Jesus Christ Superstar, Chicago, Rocky Horror Show and many others.

=== Ballet in El Paso ===
Ballet was largely nonexistent in El Paso until the arrival of Ingeborg Heuser, a professional ballerina from Germany, in the 1950s. Heuser taught ballet at the University of Texas at El Paso for 47 years and founded the city's first professional ballet company, firstly known as Texas Western Civic Ballet and eventually as Ballet El Paso. The company dissipated due to financial trouble in 1997 and Heuser retired from UTEP soon after.

The El Paso Youth Ballet was founded in 2009 by Heuser's previous student, Marta Katz, following Heuser's departure from the university. With students from the youth ballet, Heuser staged her last Nutcracker in 2006. The youth company continues to perform the Nutcracker and other pre-professional pieces in and around the El Paso area. The company provides the only platform for young ballet dancers to train and perform at such a level within the city since the folding of Ballet El Paso.

El Paso City Ballet is a current professional ballet company in El Paso, providing local employment for professional dancers in the field of ballet. The company performs a variety of classical and contemporary works choreographed by Artistic Director Lisa Skaf and artists from the US and Latin America. It has been active since 2005, performing yearly productions.

== Theaters ==
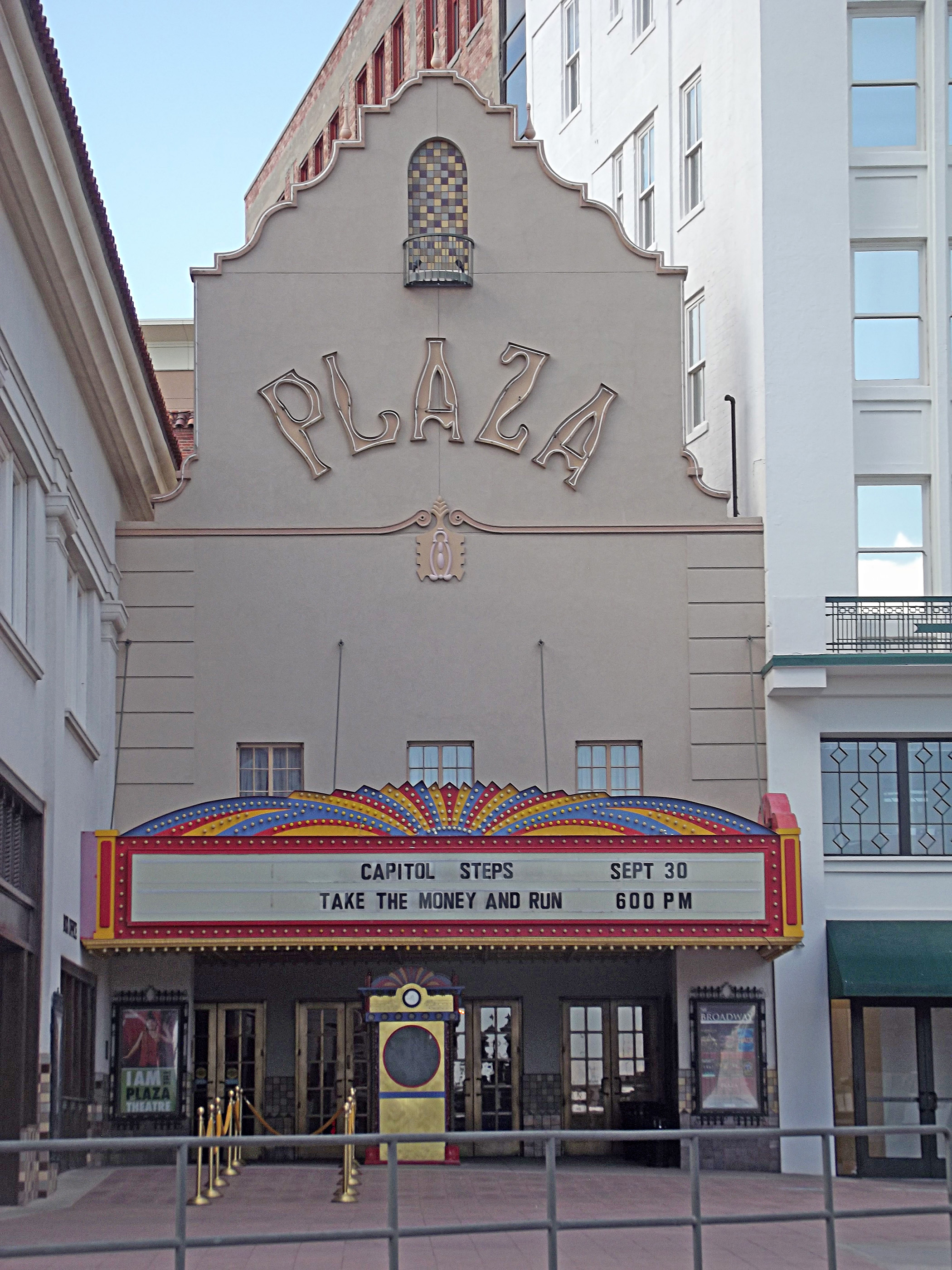
The Plaza Theatre

The Abraham Chavez Theatre, adjacent to the El Paso Convention and Performing Arts Center, welcomes patrons with a three-story-high glass-windowed entry and unique sombrero-shaped architecture, making it a distinct feature on El Paso's southwestern landscape.

The Plaza Theatre is a historic building located at 125 Pioneer Plaza. The theater stands as one of the city's most well-known landmarks. It shows various Broadway productions, musical concerts, and individual performers. It has a seating capacity of 2,100.

McKelligon Canyon is a 90-acre (360,000 m^{2}) park, located in the Franklin Mountains, open to hikers and picnickers. In the canyon, McKelligon Canyon Amphitheatre is surrounded on three sides by dramatic canyon walls; the 1,500-seat amphitheatre is used for concerts and special events, such as Viva El Paso!

The El Paso Playhouse The 105-seat theatre has gone through several incarnations as well as several locations. Originally conceived as the Festival Theatre at the 2501 Montana Street, is the longest running theater in El Paso coming up on 55 years.

== Area museums ==
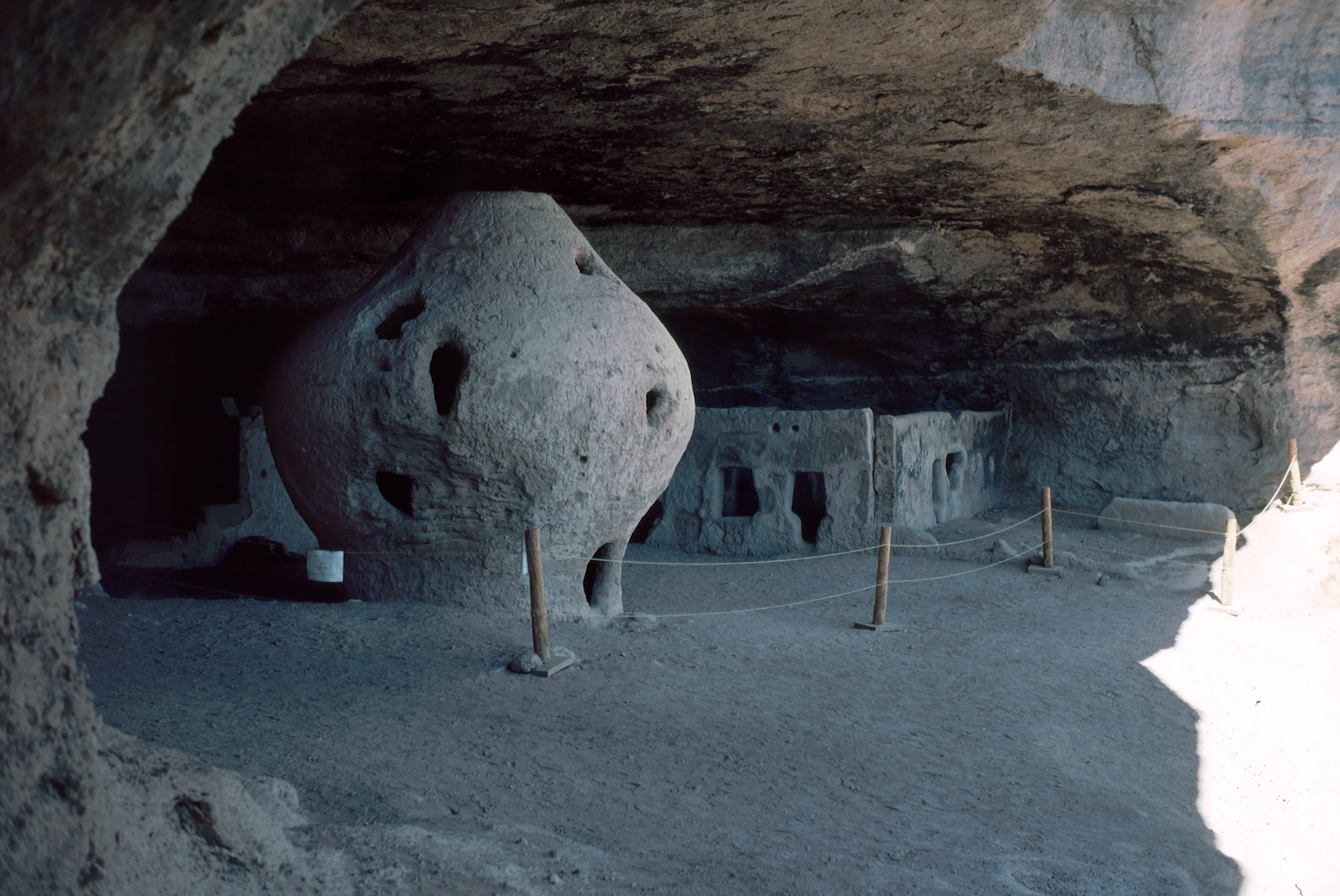
El Paso Museum of Archaeology, diorama shows Cueva de la Olla (cave of the pot – a large pot-shaped storage container for grain), Paquimé, Sierra Madre of Chihuahua

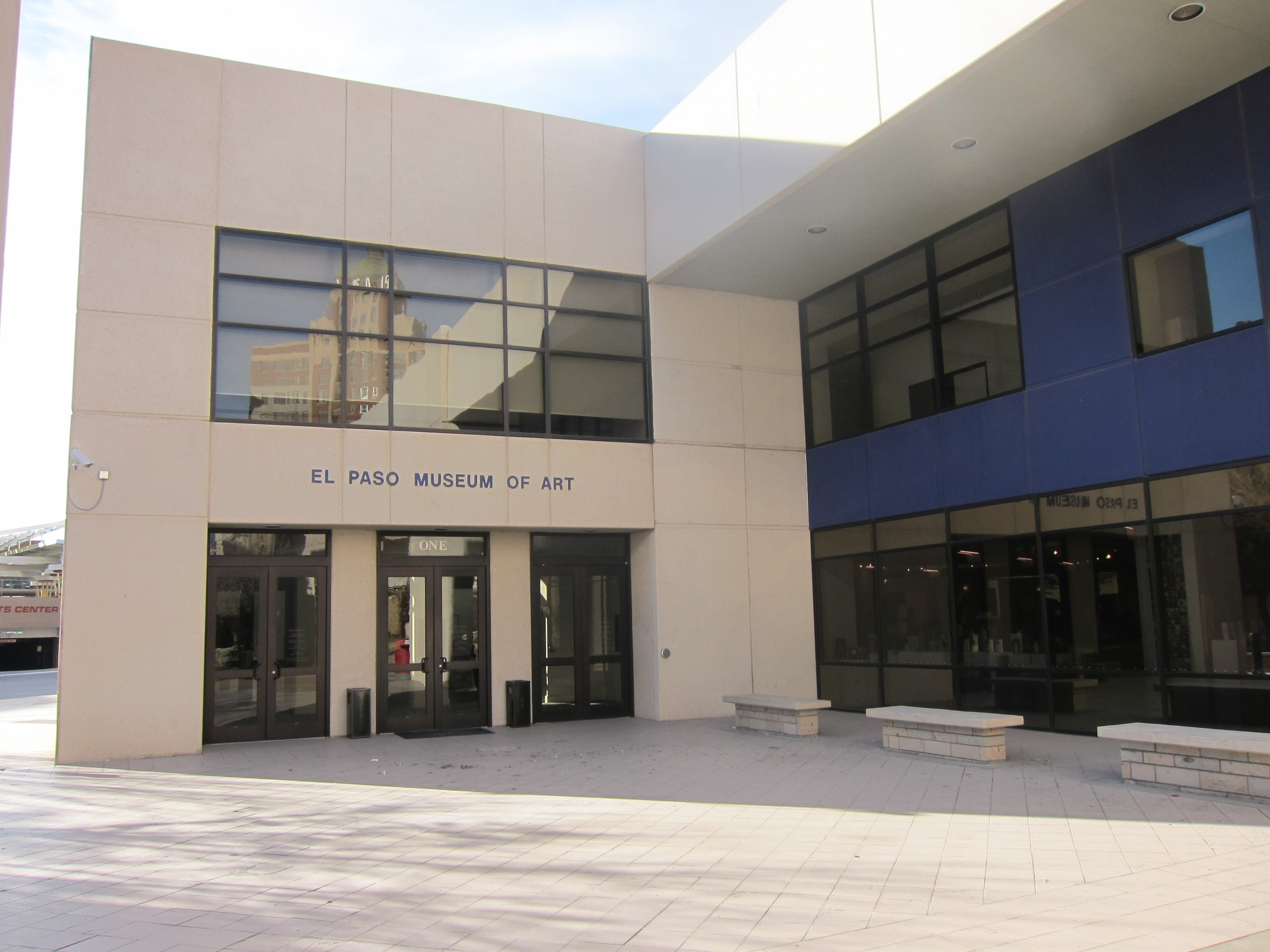
El Paso Museum of Art

The Centennial Museum and Chihuahuan Desert Gardens, located on the grounds of UTEP, includes a comprehensive collection of El Paso Brown, Native American pottery, as well as educational exhibits for students.

The El Paso Museum of Archaeology is located on the eastern slope of North Franklin Mountain, west of Gateway South Blvd. on TransMountain Rd. Its grounds include native plants of the American Southwest, as well samples of Native American shelters, in an unspoiled location. The museum includes dioramas for school children which illustrate the culture and geology of the American Southwest, such as Hueco Tanks in El Paso County. One diorama (see image to the right) is of the Cueva de la Olla (cave of the pot) which is located in the Sierra Madre of Chihuahua, an example of the Paquimé culture.

The El Paso Museum of Art is located next to the Plaza Theater adjacent to San Jacinto Plaza, the public square downtown. It contains works of southwestern artists such as Tom Lea.

Other area museums include:

- El Paso Holocaust Museum and Study Center
- International Museum of Art El Paso
- El Paso Museum of History
- Fort Bliss Museums and Study Center
- Insights El Paso Science Museum
- The Magoffin Homestead, dating from 1875, is now a state historic site.
- The National Border Patrol Museum is located adjacent to the El Paso Museum of Archaeology.
- Railroad and Transportation Museum of El Paso
- War Eagles Air Museum, Santa Teresa, New Mexico
- The Gene Roddenberry Planetarium
- Lynx Exhibits

== Sites within the city limits ==
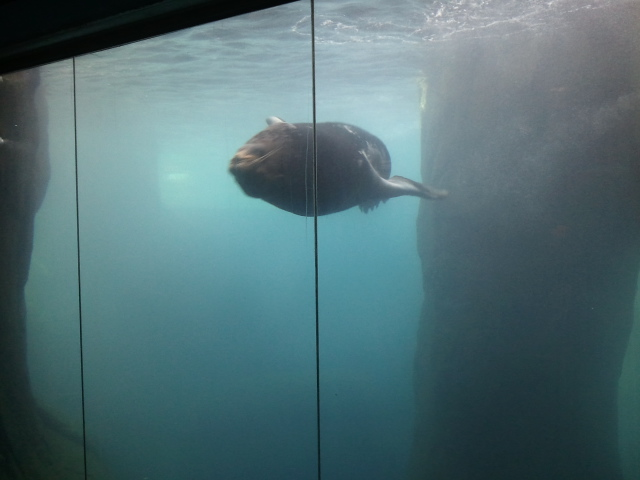
Sea Lion exhibit at the El Paso Zoo

- Ysleta Mission is recognized as the oldest continuously operated parish in the State of Texas.
- Cathedral of Saint Patrick erected in 1916 is the seat of the Roman Catholic Diocese of El Paso.
- El Paso Zoo
- Magoffin Home State Historic Site
- Plaza Hotel
- Union Depot
- Bowen Ranch
- El Paso High School
- Scenic Drive
- University of Texas at El Paso The university's distinctive style is a type of fortress architecture, Dzong, found in the present and former Buddhist mountain kingdoms of the Himalayas, Bhutan and Tibet.
- Kay Bailey Hutchison Desalination Plant – the world's largest inland desalination facility.

== Sites within the metro and surrounding area ==
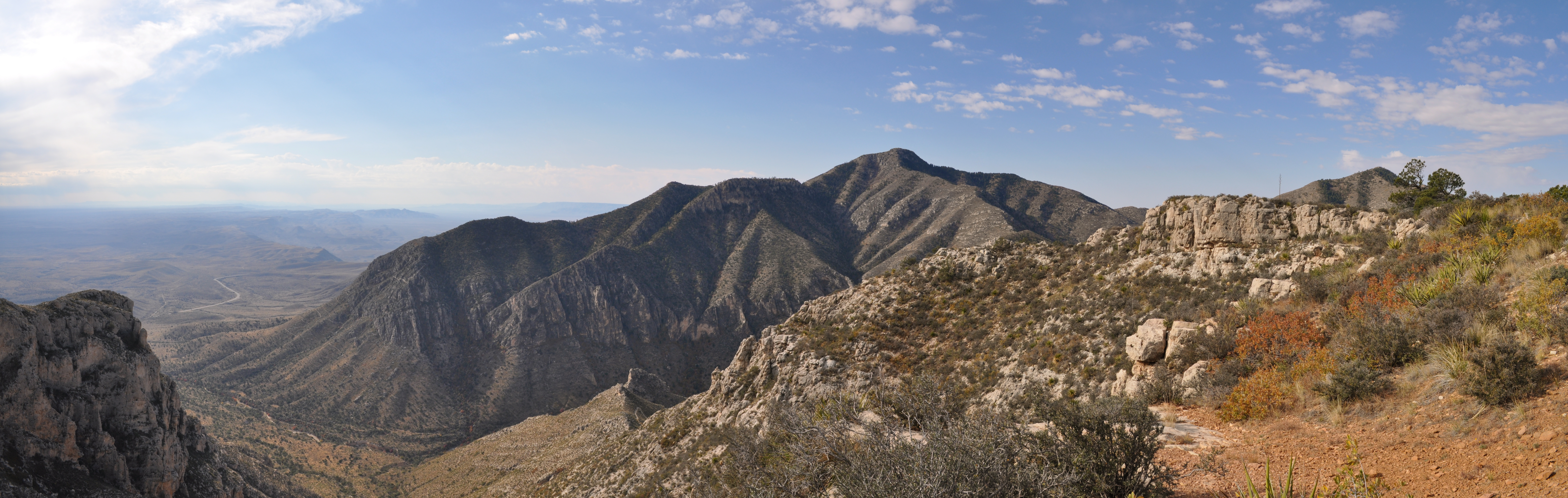
Guadalupe Peak from Bowl Trail

Within driving distance from El Paso are nine state parks, three national parks, one national monument, one national memorial and a national forest.

- Carlsbad Caverns National Park
- Guadalupe Mountains National Park
  - Guadalupe Peak – the highest point in Texas at 8,749 feet in elevation
  - McKittrick Canyon
- White Sands National Park
- Organ Mountains–Desert Peaks National Monument
- Chamizal National Memorial
- Lincoln National Forest
- Hueco Tanks State Historic Site
- Mt. Cristo Rey
- Socorro Mission
- San Elizario Chapel
- Western Playland
- Wet N' Wild Waterworld
- Old Mesilla
- Sunland Park Racetrack & Casino
- Spaceport America
- Sunland Park Mall
- Cielo Vista Mall
- Bassett Place
