= The Popular =

The Popular may refer to:

- The Popular Magazine, a former literary magazine
- The Popular (department store), a former department store in El Paso, Texas

== See also ==
- Popular (disambiguation)
