= Cueva de la Olla (archaeological site) =

Archaeological site

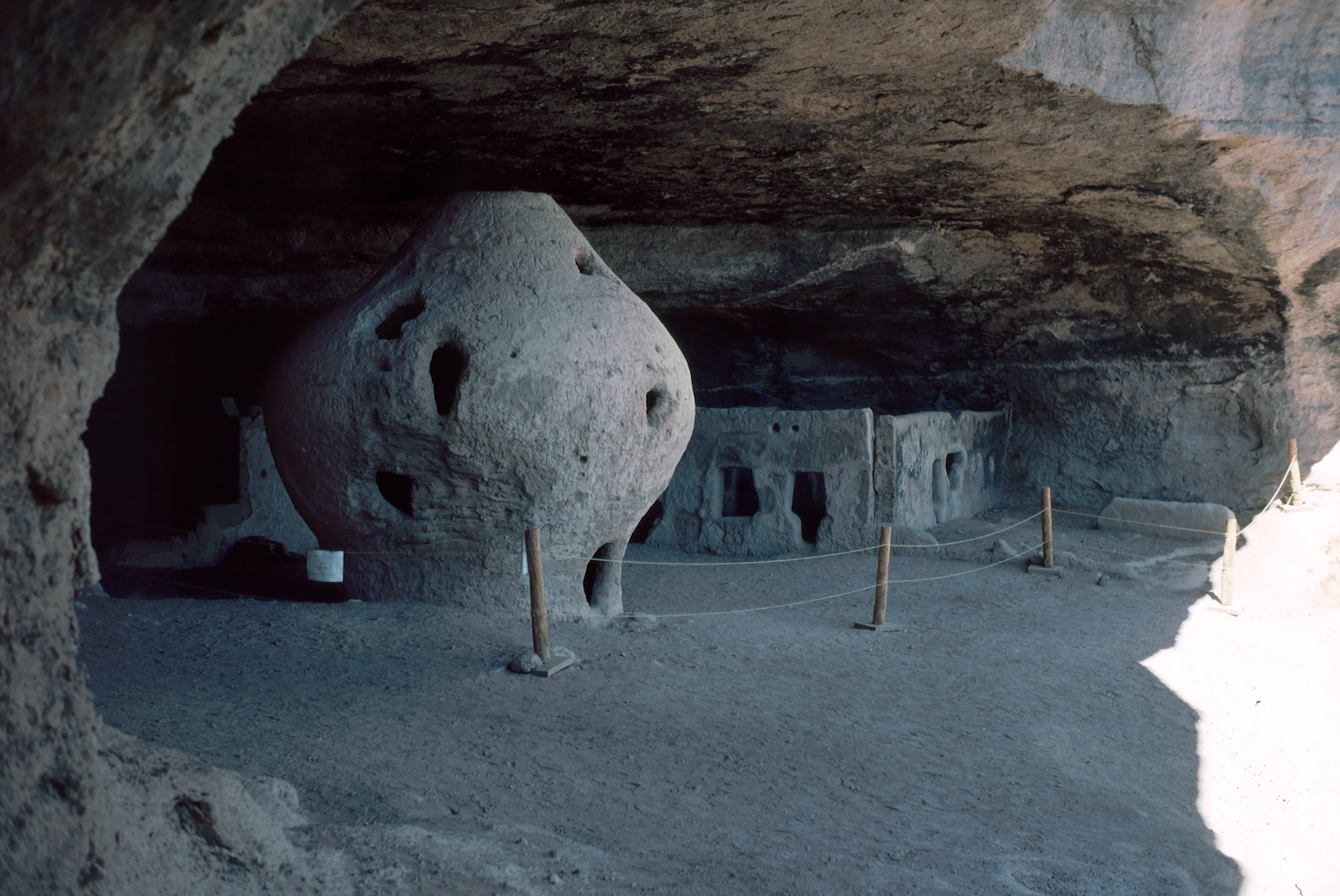
- Archaeological site
- Interactive map of Cueva de la Olla
- 30°09′10.73″N 108°19′33.25″W
- Periods: Paquimé "Perros Bravos" Phase
- Cultures: Mogollon - Paquimé
- Location: Casas Grandes Municipality, Chihuahua, Mexico
- Region: Mesoamerica, Oasisamerica

History
- Built: 950
- Abandoned: 1060

Cueva de la Olla (transl. cave of the pot) is an archaeological site located in the Valle de las Cuevas in northwestern Chihuahua, Mexico. It is approximately 47 km southwest of Nuevo Casas Grandes and near the Ignacio Zaragoza Ejido.

This site was named for its shape, which resembles a pot (known as an olla in Spanish) or a vase. It is a cuexcomate— a large, barn-like storage structure. Similar granaries were once found in scattered cave sites throughout the Sierra Madre Occidental. Cueva de la Olla is one of the oldest archaeological sites in Chihuahua and Mexico.

The Valle de las Cuevas contains a site where evidence of a continuous sequence of human occupation has been found. Human groups that lived in the region cultivated an ancestral variety of maize as early as 5500 BCE.

Due to the harsh winters, there was a need to store food. As a result, the inhabitants built a barn, which remains visible today despite deterioration.

== Cultures ==
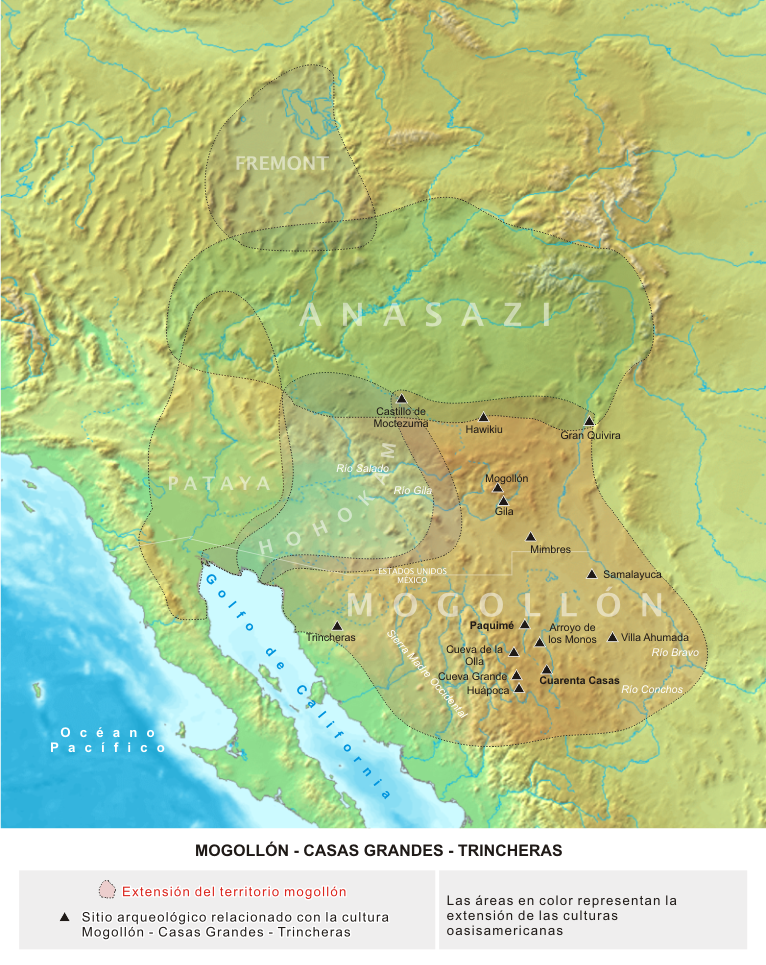
Mogollon and Paquimé Culture Extension

Groups of hunter-gatherers, possibly linked to the Mogollon, Anasazi, and Hohokam cultures, arrived in the region from the north by following the Sierra Madre Occidental. They utilized plants, hunted smaller animals such as turkeys, and initially settled in the mountains. Over time, they gradually spread to river valleys, contributing to the development of the Paquimé culture in the Casas Grandes region. The first settlers of this area were hunter-gatherers who were in the process of adopting a more sedentary lifestyle.

Cueva de la Olla dates back to an earlier occupation stage known as Perros Bravos (transl. Fierce Dogs), which lasted from 950 to 1060 CE.

Evidence of the Mogollon (/mʌɡɪˈjoʊn/ or /moʊɡəˈjoʊn/) culture has been found at the site. Additionally, ceramic fragments and other materials characteristic of the Paquimé culture have been discovered. The site's builders were likely villagers who made use of the local environment, cultivated corn, squash, and beans, and established a communal system for resource management.

It is believed that the group living in Cueva de la Olla consisted of at least 30 individuals. They likely farmed the flatlands of the region, which were well-suited for agriculture, and had access to a year-round water source from a nearby stream. They stored their food in a barn for at least 170 days and supplemented their diet with wild plants such as acorns and palms.

== Background ==
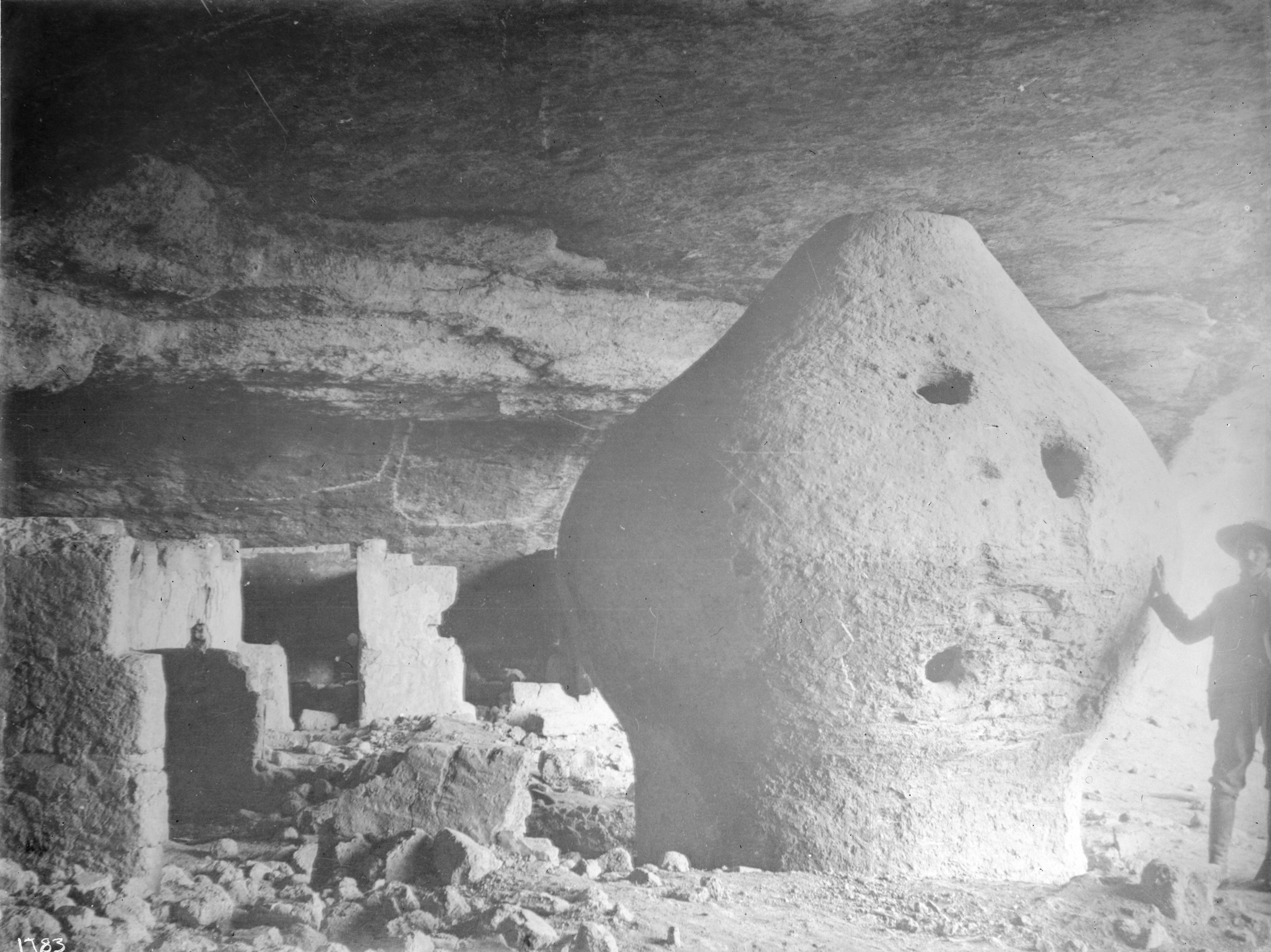
The cuexcomate in the 1900s.

Significant evidence exists of early settlers in northern Mexico belonging to the Casas Grandes culture, a sub-region of the Mogollon culture. Along with the Anasazi and Hohokam, they were part of the Oasisamerica cultural area. This northern cultural region is known as "Gran Chichimeca" in Mexico and as the American Southwest in the United States.

Cultural sites are located throughout the state of Chihuahua, with Paquimé serving as the region's central hub and commercial center. The earliest settlements of this culture date back to 1000 BCE, during the Late Archaic period. Its peak occurred between 1261 and 1300 CE, and the culture declined around 1450 CE.

The challenging nature of this area shaped the distinctive traits of its inhabitants, who transitioned from nomadic hunter-gatherers to sedentary farmers, cultivating both the land and animals.

Sites of the culture are found from the Pacific Ocean coast to the Sierra Madre Occidental, spanning a wide range of ecological and climatic environments.

=== First cultural stage ===
The first stage is called the "desert" period, during which ancient natives created petroglyphs and cave paintings for ceremonial hunting events. The most notable example is Samalayuca.

=== Second cultural stage ===
The "Mountain Stage" is characterized by cliff houses atop canyons. Caves and rock shelters became homes, providing comfort in extreme temperatures and protection from attacks. The main development of this culture occurred in Paquimé, a large commercial city with three-story buildings that gave its name to the Casas Grandes culture.

In addition to religious artifacts, they left behind important artistic creations, such as their fine ceramics.

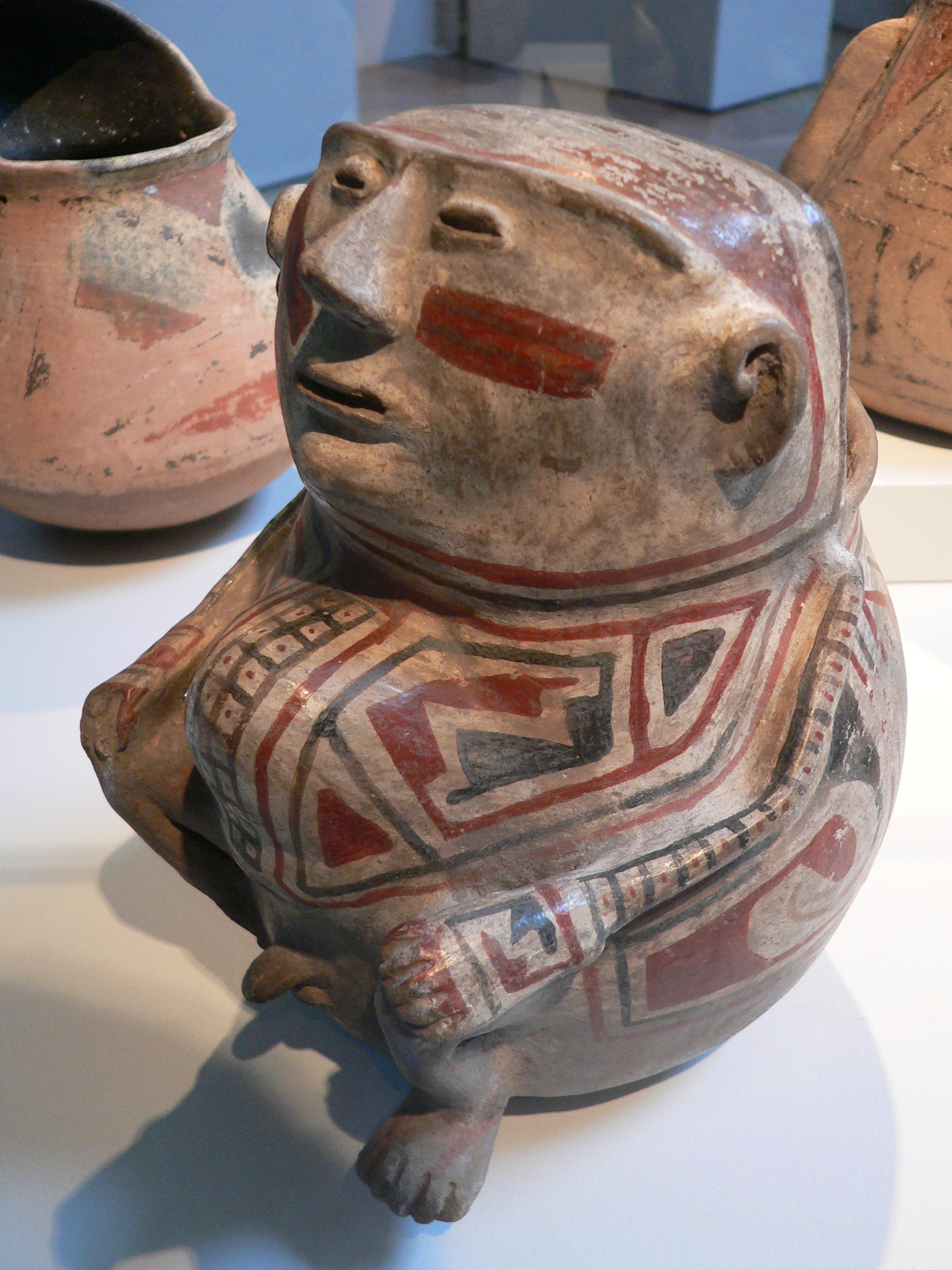
Human shaped Jar, Casas Grandes Culture. Part of the Stanford Museum collection (United States).

=== The Paquimé culture ===
The Paquimé culture is classified as part of the Mogollon cultural group. Depending on the source (U.S. or Mexican), it is considered part of the Southwest or the North. Recently, these regions have been reclassified as Oasisamerica.

The culture reached its peak in the Casas Grandes region of Chihuahua, Mexico, particularly in the human settlement known as Paquimé. This region served as a passage for ancient groups, members of human migrations to the south (Mexico and Central America) in different epochs. Around 3000 BCE, the first indications of Yuto-Aztec groups appear, which led to the displacement of the oldest Hohokam settlers to the east and west of the region.

Around 700 CE, the Paquimé culture began to emerge in the region, marked by the introduction of agriculture and the construction of semi-underground adobe houses. These houses were built along the banks of the "Piedras Verdes," "San Pedro," and "San Miguel" rivers, which converge to form the Casas Grandes River.

Archaeologist Charles Di Peso has studied the area and proposed six stages for the development of the culture.

==== Stage I ====
Pre-ceramic horizon: Its beginning is unknown, but it is believed to have concluded between 100 and 200 CE.

==== Stage II ====
Undecorated ceramic period: It concluded around 800 CE.

==== Stage III ====
Old period: It concluded around 1100 CE. During this period, the first villages were established, and their settlers practiced seasonal agriculture, utilizing runoff water from the mountains.

The period is subdivided into the following phases:

- Convent Phase.
- Pilón Phase.

During these phases, the construction of circular homes began. These houses were built by excavating a circular pit less than a meter deep, which served as the foundation. Each housing area was approximately 10 m², and the doors were round. In the center of the village stood a larger communal house, bigger than the family homes.

- Perros Bravos Phase. During this phase, the size of the houses increased, and construction began to occur in clusters. The foundation shape changed from circular to square. Decorated pottery became common, along with the appearance of shell necklaces, small turquoise beads, and copper items.

==== Stage IV ====
Medium period: It ended around 1400 CE. During this time, the social organization and appearance of the city were transformed.

The period is subdivided into the following phases:

- Buena Fe Phase. Houses were single-story, with T-shaped doors and beam-supported roofs.
- Paquimé Phase. The culture reached its greatest splendor, with increased trade relations with other populations and the construction of ceremonial structures. The city was crossed by an irrigation system of channels that provided water. A ballcourt was built, and multi-story houses began to be constructed, some with up to four levels.
- Diablo Phase. The city was partially abandoned as the decline began due to attacks from enemy groups. Around 1340 CE, the population was decimated by enemies, and many inhabitants were killed, as evidenced by the large number of human remains found in grotesque postures.

==== Stage V ====
Late period: From 1340 to 1660 CE. This period is subdivided into the following phases:

- Robles Phase.
- First sporadic Spaniards contact Phase.

==== Stage VI ====
Spanish period: From 1660 to 1821 CE.

=== Constructive characteristics ===
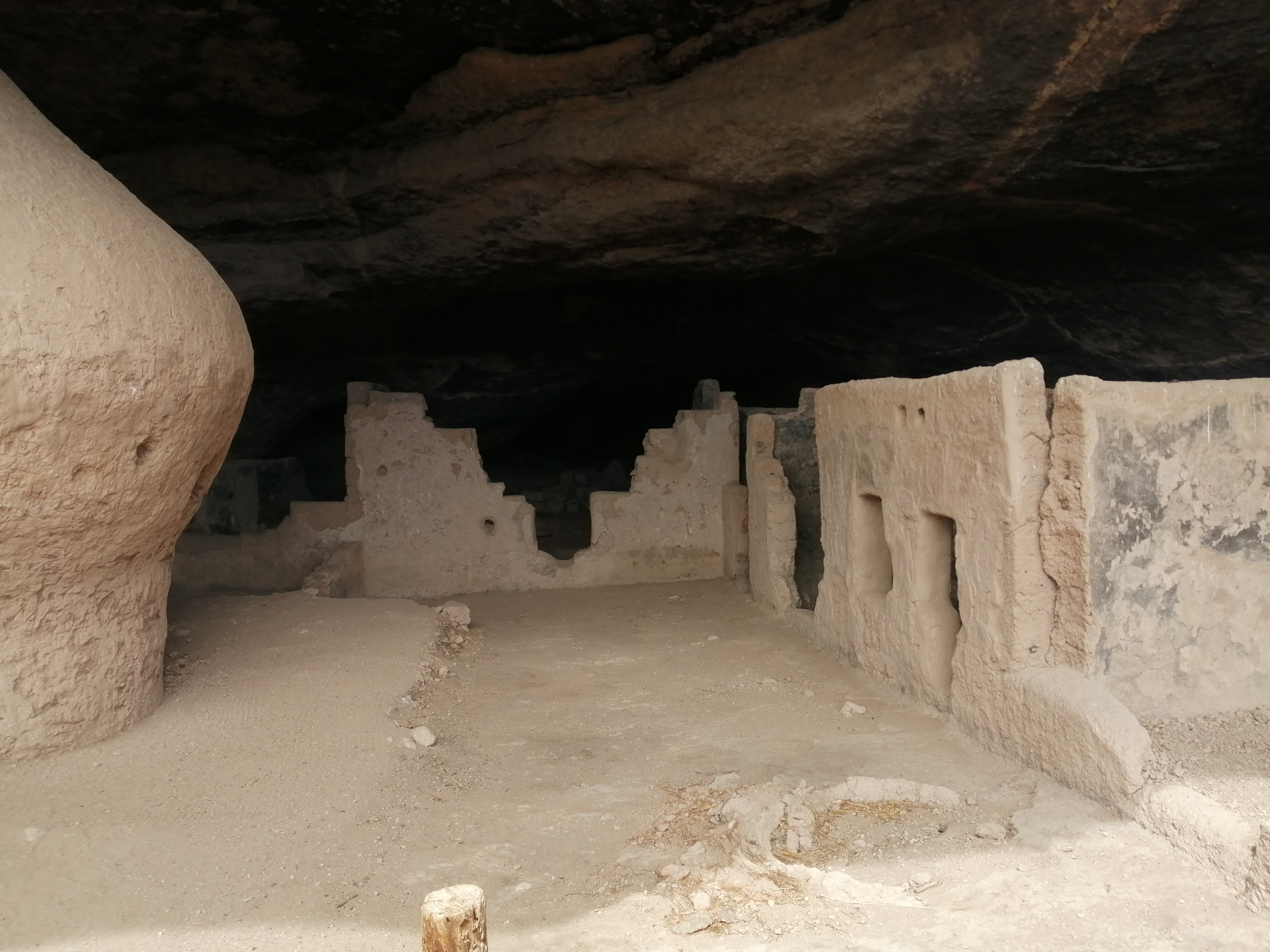
Walls and T shaped doors at the site.

==== T Doors ====
T-shaped doors were constructed in adobe walls, which were wider at the top and narrower at the bottom, with a small height of barely one meter. According to a theory, the shape of the doors is associated with prehistoric "cachinas" (ancestor spirits) represented in the American Southwest.

==== Walls ====
Construction used a box system, with molds to pour mud without organic material, which was then compacted. The exterior was stuccoed with sand, lime, and oyster shell dust, and painted in blue, green, and pink. There was no foundation; the walls were built from slots 25 cm deep. For multi-story buildings, the walls at lower levels were wider, up to 1.40 m, while at higher levels, they were reduced to 50 cm.

==== Furnaces and ventilation ====
The design was used to control the interior temperature. Ventilation was provided through the doors, allowing smoke to escape. The size of the ventilation openings was proportional to the size of the room.

==== Stairs and ramps ====
Constructed in buildings.

==== Water system ====
"Water retention systems": An irrigation system of channels on terraces and embankments diverted water from rivers into the city. Rectangular stone slabs, 30 cm wide, were used to channel water into rooms. These channels included a deposit that filtered used water for Temazcal (steam baths). A drainage system was also in place.

== The site ==
It is one of the most characteristic sites of the Paquimé culture. The complex includes seven rooms built inside a cave, along with a large circular barn that, from a distance, appears to be a giant pot. This barn was used to store corn and squash.

For the construction of the rooms and barn, cast adobe was used, reflecting the typical Paquimé architecture, including T-shaped doors.

The cave is not very deep, and its entrance is about three meters high.

=== Cuexcomate ===
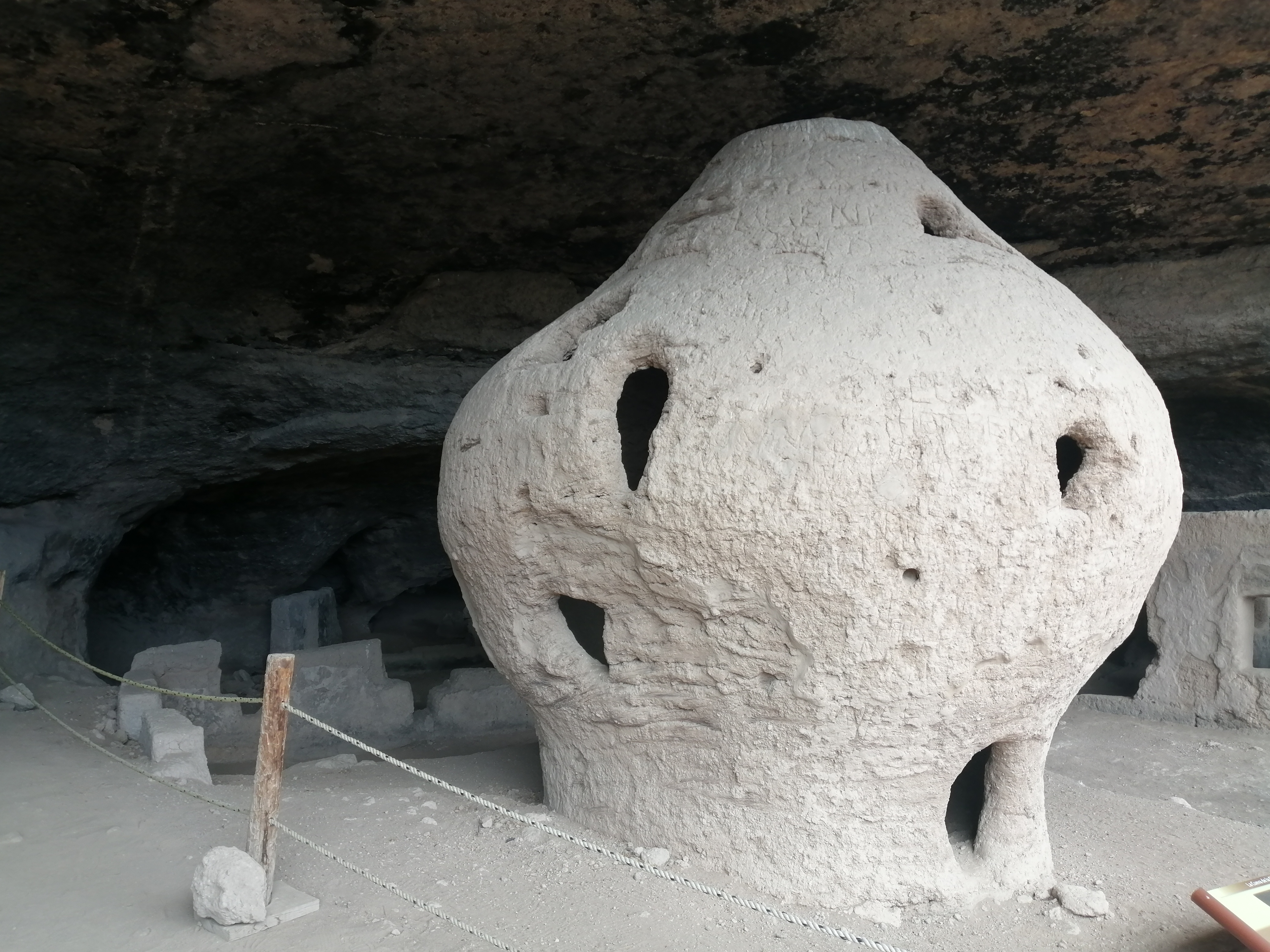
The cuexcomate.

This type of barn, similar to others in the highlands, such as those in Cacaxtla, Tlaxcala, and cuexcomates, serves as evidence of structures used for the storage of agricultural products, as well as for food and human subsistence.

Archaeological evidence exists of peoples who practiced agriculture and used soil and water retention systems.

The cuexcomate at Cueva de la Olla is significant due to its size (2.5 meters in diameter and 3.55 meters high), as well as its location within the complex, contributing to the community's well-being.

The structure is mushroom-shaped and was built with dry rolled straw. It is believed to have been used to store amaranth seeds, epazote, dasylirion, guaje, and other items in quantities sufficient to last for 170 days.

It had a red and black coating with native designs. It is believed that these designs invoked the protection of food and the well-being of the approximately 30 inhabitants, giving the structure a ceremonial nature.

It has a semi-circular opening, 80 cm at the top, likely for ventilation, and was covered with palms and carrizo. The walls have holes for placing and removing grains. The types of seeds found indicate the agricultural practices of its inhabitants. Embedded in the walls are seven clay rooms arranged in a square. The T-shaped doors are almost destroyed, but some can still be fully reconstructed.

It is believed that the cave had a residential purpose and contains a small room inside another, likely used by an important person.

There are other caves with prehistoric content, including the "Cueva de la Golondrina," located in the same canyon.

== See also ==
- Mogollon culture
- Oasisamerica
