= Plaza Theatre (El Paso) =

Building in El Paso, Texas

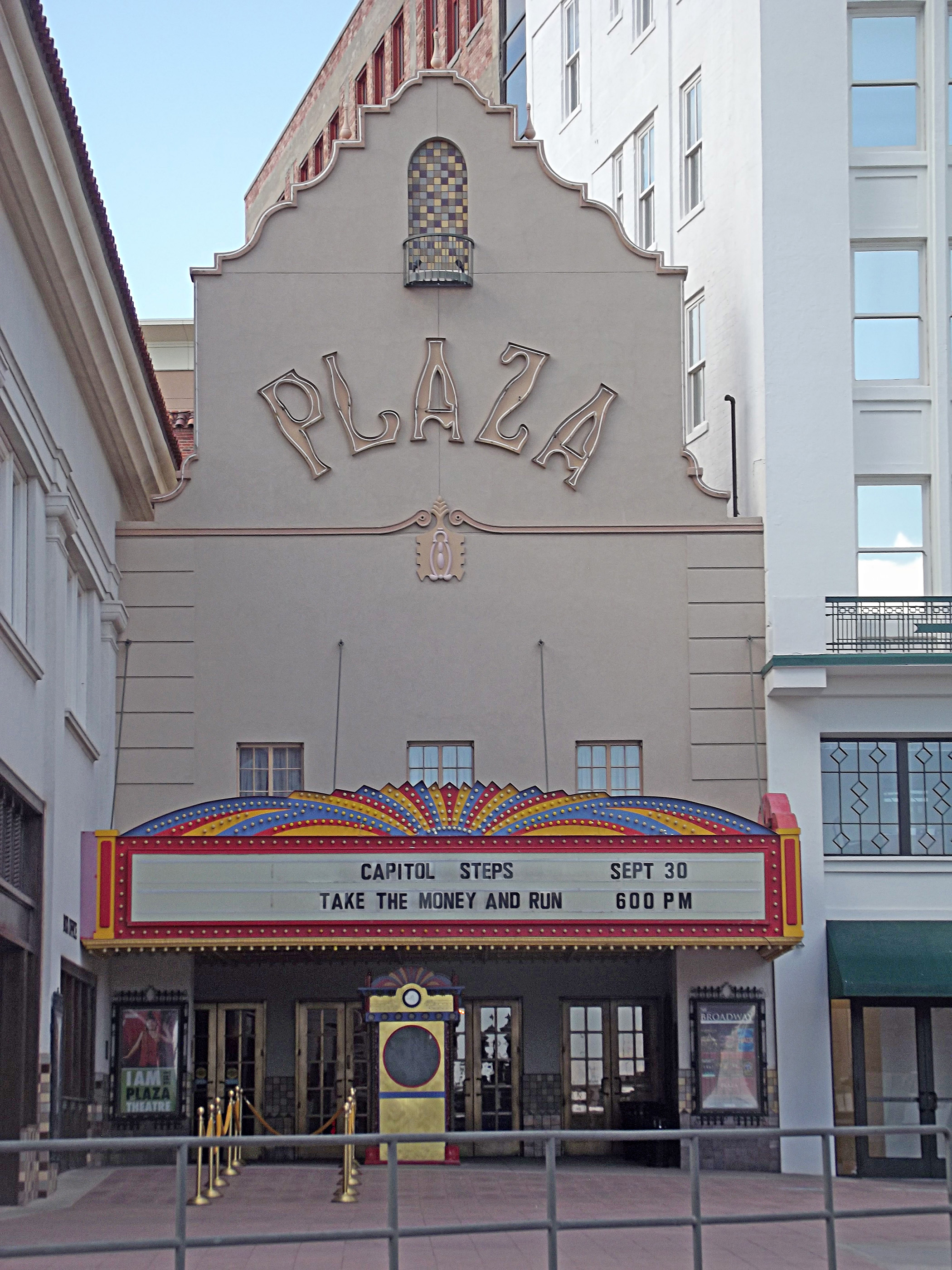
- Interactive map of Plaza Theatre
- Address: 125 Pioneer Plaza; El Paso, Texas; United States
- Owner: City of El Paso
- Operator: SMG
- Capacity: Kendle Kidd Performance Hall: 2000; Philanthropy Theatre: 200

Construction
- Opened: September 12, 1930
- Reopened: March 17, 2006

Website
- elpasolive.com
- Plaza Theatre
- U.S. National Register of Historic Places
- Location within Texas Location within the United States
- Coordinates: 31°45′31″N 106°29′11″W
- Area: 1 acre (0.40 ha)
- Built: 1929
- Built by: C.A. Goetting
- Architect: W. Scott Dunne
- Architectural style: Colonial Revival, Spanish Colonial Revival
- NRHP reference No.: 87000902
- Added to NRHP: June 4, 1987

The Plaza Theatre is a historic building in El Paso, Texas, United States, built in 1930. The theater stands as one of the city's most well-known landmarks, and remains operational today. The theatre is a National Historic Building of Significance featuring the 2,050-seat Kendall Kidd Performance Hall, and the smaller 200-seat Philanthropy Theatre. It hosts Broadway productions, musical concerts, individual performers and the annual Plaza Classic Film Festival.

== History ==
Prior to the Plaza Theatre being built, there had been a large produce warehouse, belonging to Bernard and Ben Schuster, which occupied the location on Pioneer Plaza. In February 1927, the owner of the principal El Paso theaters, Louis L. Dent, bought the property on Pioneer Plaza with the stated intention of doing something good for the city of El Paso. Upon purchase of the property, he told the El Paso Times, "El Paso has been good to me, and I am going to put something everybody will be proud of."

In 1929, construction of the Spanish Colonial Revival style Plaza Theater began. It was designed by the prolific Dallas architect W. Scott Dunne, who is credited with more than 30 theaters in Texas and Oklahoma. Today the Plaza is recognized as his surviving masterpiece. H. Ponsford & Sons built the theater, and constructed by C.A. Goetting Construction Company. The Plaza was designed as a modern film house in a Spanish Colonial revival style with the flexibility of presenting stage shows. Construction was completed in 1930. The Wurlitzer Company installed a $60,000 pipe organ. It was advertised as the "largest theater of its kind between Dallas and Los Angeles."

Opening night was on September 12, 1930, with the movie Follow Thru to a capacity crowd of 2,410. Although several theaters existed in downtown El Paso at the time the Plaza Theatre opened, its size, elaborate decor, and technical innovations made it stand out. It was advertised as the largest theater of its kind between Dallas and Los Angeles. The Plaza has been a vaudeville or burlesque house as well as also showing movies. The theater featured an "atmospheric" ceiling complete with twinkling stars which were astronomically correct stars and projections of lazily floating clouds. It was the first public theater in the United States with air conditioning.

In 1933, Interstate Theaters purchased the Plaza Theatre. On February 10, 1934, the Plaza's very first stage drama, Richelieu, was performed. The cast included then famous Walter Hampton, Dallas Anderson, John Davenport and Mable More. In 1939, the theater showed Gone With the Wind in two different showings because of Jim Crow laws in El Paso. The first showing was whites only, but a civil rights activist, Betty Mary Goetting, prevailed on the Plaza Theatre to show a midnight screening which African Americans could attend. The midnight show of Gone With the Wind was reported to be "packed." In 1949, the Plaza hosted the world premier of the film El Paso, which drew a capacity and star-studded crowd, and also showed Tom Lea's The Brave Bulls.

=== Decline ===
By the 1950s, two major influences factored into a slow decline in the Plaza Theatre's patronage. The advent of television and the rise of suburban neighborhoods located farther and farther away from downtown served as major challenges to the Plaza and other downtown establishments. At the same time, a new source of competition arose with the advent of drive-in theaters in the late 1940s.

By the early 1970s, the theater had fallen into disrepair, and was sold. Many of its impressive amenities, including furnishings, artwork, and the Mighty Wurlitzer Organ were auctioned off. The Dipp family, owners of several downtown properties at that time, including the nearby Plaza Hotel, purchased the theater.

The Plaza closed on May 31, 1974. In 1985, the state of Texas declared the Plaza Theatre to be a Historical Landmark. It was briefly reopened in 1970 and 1980, only to finally close its doors in 1989.

In 1989, after years of infrequent programming, the Dipp family sought to demolish the Plaza Theatre in order to make way for a parking lot. Spurred by a groundswell of community support, the El Paso Community Foundation began negotiations to raise the required $9 million to save the theater from demolition. With only six weeks to raise the funds, fundraising events were held across the community with the most visible effort being staged by actress Rita Moreno the day before the deadline. It was announced that evening that enough money had been raised to save the Plaza Theatre. After the El Paso Community Foundation placed a new roof on the theater, it was donated to the City of El Paso in 1990. Even though this theater was falling, it was still trying to pull itself up.

=== Reopening ===
One of the few remaining theaters of its kind in the country, the Plaza had lost most of its original splendor. Furnishings and artwork had been removed, the facade had been altered, and parts of its once-advanced electrical systems were no longer functional, yet the interior structure appeared as it had for close to seventy years. In 2000, a volunteer steering committee, assembled by the El Paso Community Foundation, began to assess the viability of restoring the Plaza Theatre. The committee concluded that the project was feasible, and in 2001, a leading promoter, producer and marketer of live entertainment events, conducted an extensive survey of El Paso's local performing arts community. The survey concluded that: a market did exist in El Paso for additional performing arts programming, and that the public had a strong affinity for the Plaza and was eager to attend events at a restored Plaza. On July 30, 2002, the City of El Paso formally approved a public/private partnership with the El Paso Community Foundation to restore the Plaza Theatre to its original appearance. The foundation committed to raising $12 million towards the renovation effort, to restoring and reinstalling the Mighty Wurlitzer Organ at the Plaza Theatre, and to donating the adjacent building (Centre Annex), which would be integrated into the overall operations of the Plaza. The City of El Paso agreed to fund the remaining cost of the restoration.

Thos. S. Byrne, Ltd. and Arrow Builders were hired to perform the restoration. The companies took particular interest in the project, noting that "With over 2,000 seats at the commencement of restoration, the Plaza is currently one of the nation's largest non-functioning theaters in the United States." The companies worked diligently to insure all phases of construction complied with historical restoration guidelines.

At a cost of nearly $38 million, the Plaza reopened on March 17, 2006. The first performance hosted at the refurbished theater was Riverdance which played Friday, March 17, 2006, through Sunday, March 19 with multiple sold-out performances. The reopened theater boasts a 2,050-seat main theater with a 10-story stage house capable of handling large traveling Broadway shows. In addition, with the completion of the Centre Annex, the facility includes a 200-seat children's theater, a rooftop garden, meeting facilities and a privately managed restaurant. The smaller theater is named the Philanthropy Theatre.

Despite the completion of the project, the El Paso Community Foundation continues appropriating funds to buy back original art and furnishings of the Plaza.

== The building ==
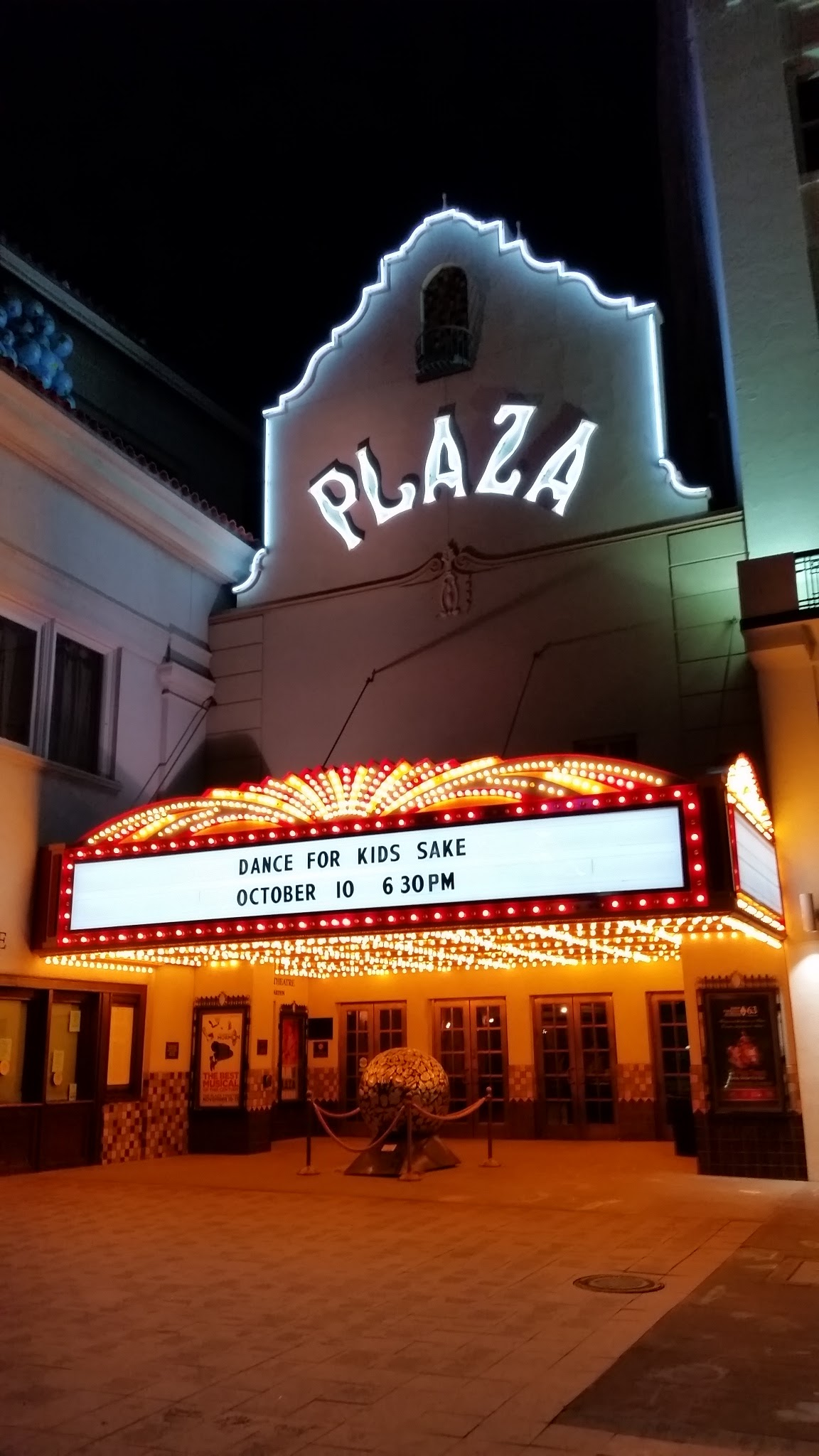
The Plaza Theater at night.

No expense was spared in creating the elaborate building. At the point where the entrance wing of the Plaza adjoined the auditorium, a domed tower rises in three tiers, projecting above the roof line. Other exterior references to the Spanish mission-style included modest brick delineations at the building's corners, simple cartouche motifs and stepped and curved parapets with tile accents along the roof line. While the exterior facade was designed to be reminiscent of a mission-style parapet, patrons were awed by the interior, with its intricately painted ceilings, mosaic-tiled floors, Posh carpeting, decorative wrought iron banisters and sconces and, to heighten the effect, antique furnishings. Due to such grandiose rococo design, the Plaza became known as "The Showplace of the Southwest."

=== The Mighty Wurlitzer ===
Elevated from the orchestra pit stands the $60,000 Mighty Wurlitzer Organ, designed to accompany vaudeville shows, sing-alongs, and to entertain patrons before and after films. Its "toy box" provides the organ with the versatility to replicate such sounds as horses' hooves, the ocean surf and birds chirping. The organ had 15 ranks with 61 pipes in each rank.

In 1973, the Mighty Wurlitzer Organ was sold at auction and housed at the home of a private collector in Dallas. In 1998 the organ was restored and returned to El Paso as a donation by the late Karl O. Wyler Sr.. During renovations of the theater, the organ was put on display at Sunland Park Mall located in Northwest El Paso The organ was rebuilt by Pipe Organ Artisans of Arizona, Tucson, and re-installed. The Opus 2123 console was returned to its original finish. It is the only one of its kind (a Wurlitzer Balaban III) left intact.

== Trivia ==
- Through the years, the Plaza hosted such popular entertainers as Roy Rogers and Dale Evans, the Barrymore family, Sally Rand, Tallulah Bankhead, Hopalong Cassidy, John Wayne, the Marx Brothers, Rita Moreno, Henry Fonda, Tom Mix, and James Stewart.
- The original seating capacity was 2,410, with 1,510 seats on the main floor, 508 in the mezzanine and 392 in the balcony. Before reopening, the seating accommodations were diminished to provide future patrons with wider, more comfortable seating.
- Originally, colored patrons were only allowed to sit in the balcony of the theater. The main seating was segregated as white seating only.
- The Plaza had one fallout shelter located beneath the stage. Prior to restoration, food rations could still be found within the shelter with the original packagings intact.

== See also ==
- National Register of Historic Places listings in El Paso County, Texas
