= The Shoppes at Solana =

- Location: Interstate 10 at Sunland Park Drive, El Paso, Texas
- Coordinates: 31.816907°N 106.546420°W
- Opened: August 31, 1988; 38 years ago
- Developer: Melvin Simon & Associates
- Manager: Enoch Kimmelman
- Owner: Enoch Kimmelman
- Num. of stores: 100+
- Num. of anchor tenants: 6 (5 open, 1 vacant)
- Floor area: 918,475 sq ft (85,329 m^{2})
- Floors: 2
- Website: https://theshoppesatsolana.com/

The Shoppes at Solana (formerly Sunland Park Mall) is a shopping mall in El Paso, Texas, owned and operated by Enoch Kimmelman. It is located on El Paso's west side, at Interstate 10 and Sunland Park Drive. It features five anchor stores operating under four brand names, and more than 130 specialty stores on two enclosed levels. It is the second-largest mall of the three in the metro area, behind Cielo Vista Mall.

With a gross leasable area of 918,475 square feet (85,329 m^{2}), the mall is classified as a super-regional mall by the International Council of Shopping Centers.

Construction of the mall was completed in 1988, and it opened to the public on August 31 of that year. It is approximately one mile from Sunland Park Racetrack & Casino, a racino just across the state line in Sunland Park, New Mexico. It is about four miles (6 km) from the border with Mexico.

Macy's closed its Sunland Park Mall store in 2017. Western Wear moved into the former Macy's space.

Forever 21 closed in 2018.

On November 8, 2018, it was announced that Sears will be closing this location in early 2019 a part of a plan to close 40 stores.

In July 2023, the mall was sold and bought by Enoch Kimmelman, a president and CEO of Starr Western Wear. The mall was renamed The Shoppes at Solana. The mall's website and domain name merged to the new name in August 2023.

Sometime in 2024 Conn's closed due to bankruptcy.

== Anchors ==
- Dillard's (opened in 1988)
- Starr Western Wear (opened in 2018)
- TruFit Athletic Club (Old Sears)
- Monkey Rock Family Entertainment Center (Opening April–May 2022 in Old Sears Space)
- Sun City Kitty (opened in 2022)

== Former Anchors ==
- Conn's (closed in 2024, replaced Sears)
- Dillard's Men (opened in 2000, consolidated into Dillard's Women in 2022)
- Foley's (opened in 2004, became Macy's in 2006)
- Forever 21 (opened in 2009, closed in 2018)
- JCPenney (opened in 1991, closed in 2004, replaced by Foley's)
- Macy's (closed in 2017, replaced by Starr Western Wear)
- Mervyn's (opened in 1988, closed in 2008, replaced by Forever 21)
- Montgomery Ward (opened in 1992, closed in 1999, replaced by Dillard's Men)
- Sears (opened in 1996, closed in 2019)
- The Popular Dry Goods (opened in 1988, closed in 1995, replaced by Sears)

== Wurlitzer theatre organ ==
A Mighty Wurlitzer theater organ, originally located in El Paso's Plaza Theatre, was located at the mall while the shuttered theater was being renovated for reopening. The organ was returned to the area from a Dallas, Texas collector and installed at the mall. The organ returned to the Plaza when it reopened in 2006.
