= The Popular (department store) =

Chain of department stores

Popular Dry Goods Company
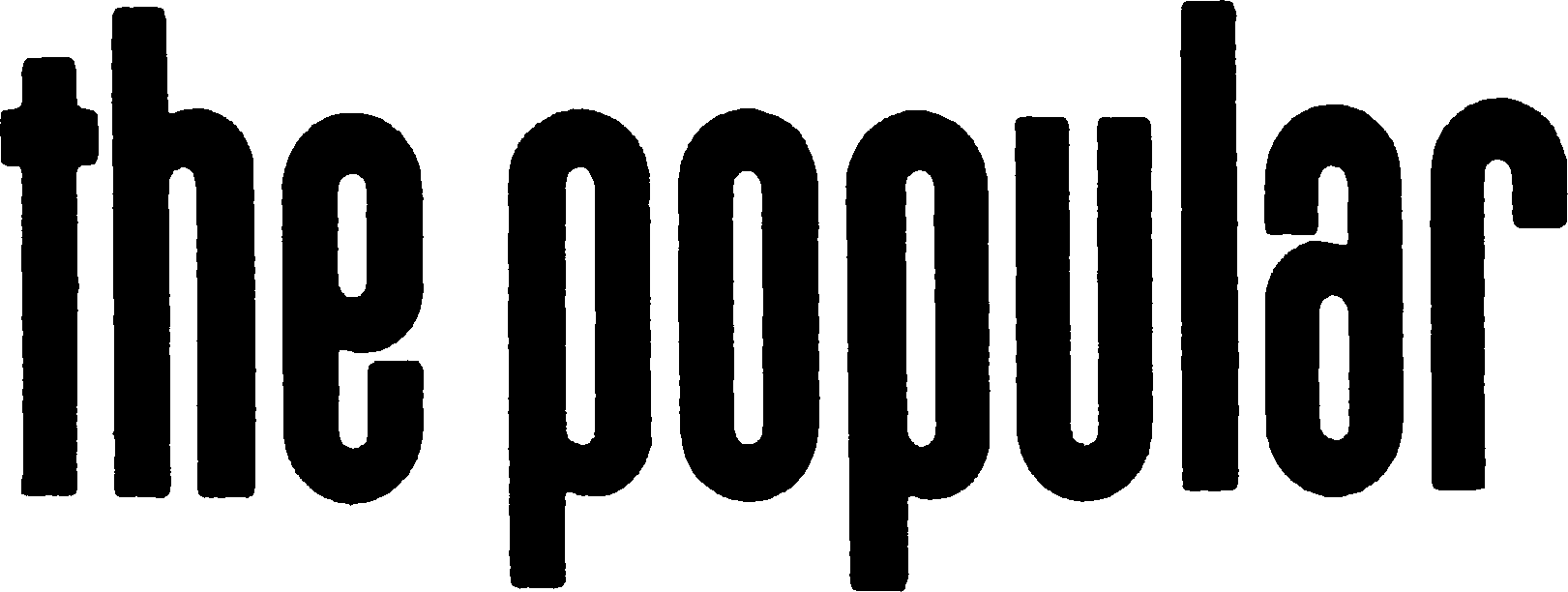
- Type: Private company
- Industry: Retail
- Founded: 1902 in El Paso, Texas
- Founder: Adolph Schwartz
- Defunct: November 6, 1995
- Fate: Assets Liquidated
- Headquarters: El Paso, Texas
- Area served: El Paso, Texas
- Key people: Edward Schwartz, CEO
- Services: Sale of clothing, footwear, bedding, furniture, jewelry, beauty products, electronics, and housewares.
- Number of employees: 600

The Popular Dry Goods Company (known as The Popular and by its large Spanish-speaking clientele as La Popular) was a local chain of department stores in El Paso, Texas. It carried national brands of clothing, footwear, bedding, furniture, jewelry, beauty products, electronics, and housewares. At the time of its closing in 1995, there were four locations in El Paso at Downtown, Bassett Center, Northgate Center and Sunland Park Mall. For much of its existence, The Popular was El Paso's largest locally owned department store.

== History ==
The Popular Dry Goods Company was founded in 1902 by Adolf Schwartz, a Hungarian immigrant who had previously opened two other retail stores in the area, Tres B (Buena, Bonita, Barata/Good, Pretty, Cheap) and The Fair which he had founded in 1900. Schwartz closed The Fair in 1902 and it was succeeded by The Popular, which he opened with his nephew Maurice Schwartz and other relatives. In 1907, the Popular moved from the northeast corner of El Paso and Overland Streets to Mesa and San Antonio and consisted of three floors by 1914.

In 1917 Schwartz transformed The Popular from a general store to a modern department store with a six-story building on Mesa and San Antonio Streets.

Schwartz’s granddaughter Ann Goodman Schaechner, tells a story about Pancho Villa and Francisco Madero, opposing military leaders in the Mexican Revolution, visiting The Popular at the same time, "One was on the basement and the first floor and the other was on the second or third floor. A clerk recognized the foes and ran back and forth between floors attending the two men so that they would not bump into each other. Thanks to the observant employee, the two men never saw each other, and the store kept both good customers."

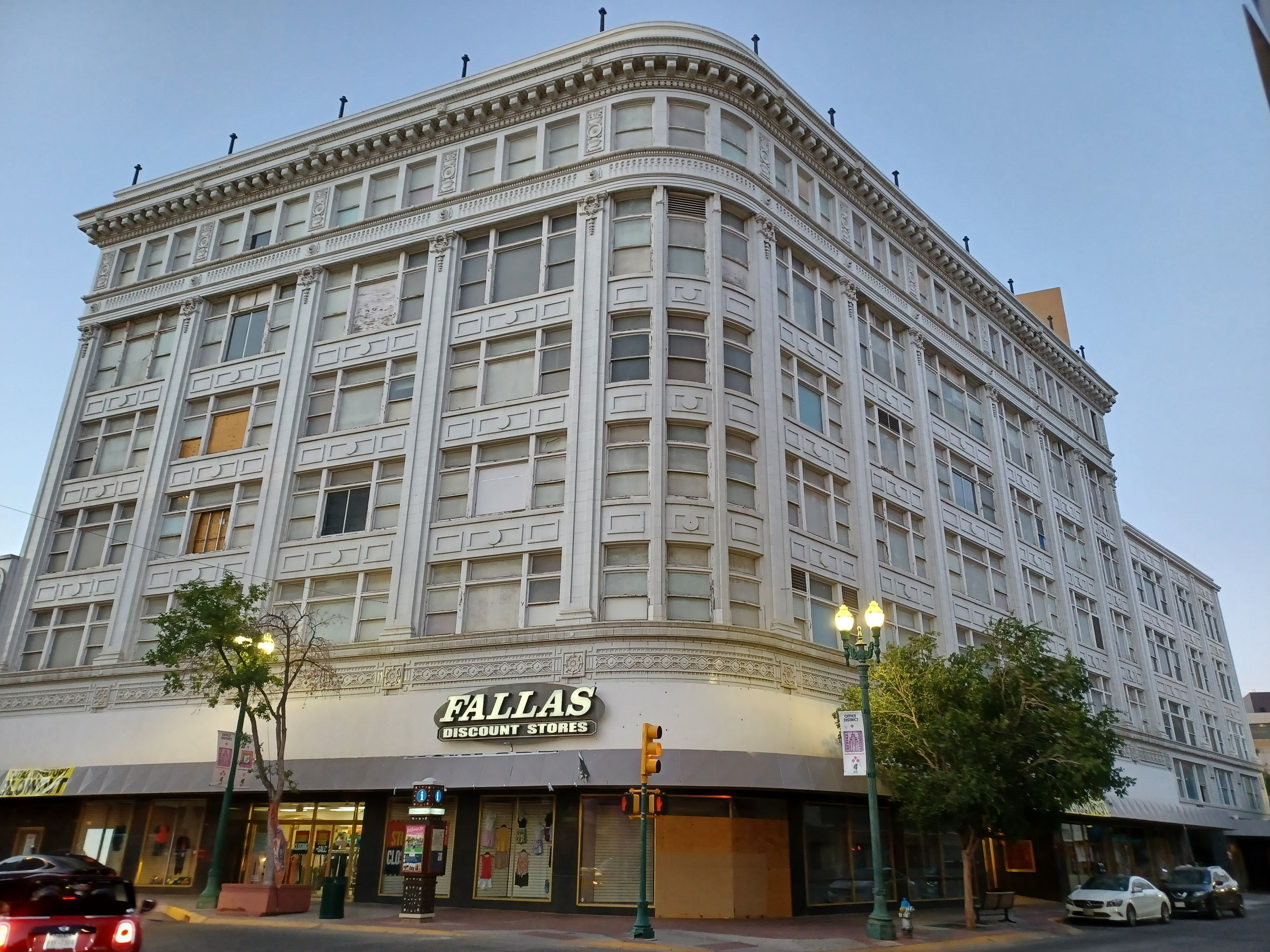
Popular Building in 2022.

Adolph Schwartz died from a heart attack at the age of 74 on March 3, 1941. After the retirement of Schwartz' nephew Maurice, Maurice's sons

Herbert M. Schwartz and Albert J. Schwartz, continued to run the company.

The Popular's expansion began in 1962 with the opening of a second location at Bassett Center. This was followed by a third location at Northgate (later Northpark Mall) in 1966, and then a location at Sunland Park Mall in 1988.

In 1995, the devalued peso and Mexico’s recession along with the newly enacted North American Free Trade Agreement posed an economic strain to the region. All Popular stores were closed on November 6, 1995. Dillard's purchased The Popular's credit accounts and Bassett Center store. Sears purchased the Sunland Park location. The remaining two locations were dissolved.
