= Bassett Place =

Coordinates: 31.7834°N 106.4124°W

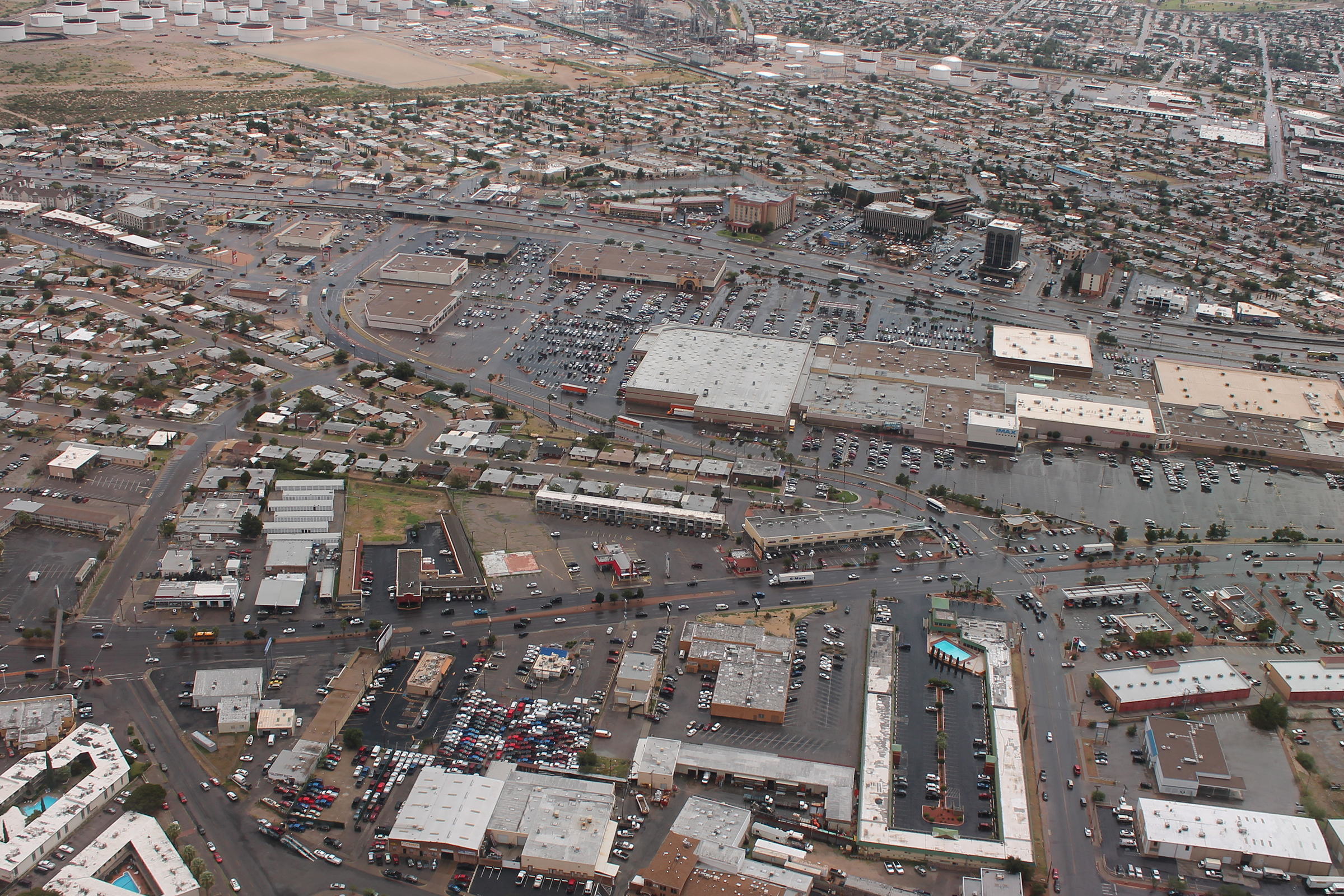
- Aerial view, 2014
- Location: El Paso, Texas, United States
- Address: 6101 Gateway West Blvd
- Opened: 1962
- Developer: Center Corporation
- Owner: Cypress Equities
- Num. of stores: 80
- Num. of anchor tenants: 4
- Floor area: 730,000 sq ft (68,000 m^{2})
- Floors: 1 (2 in Kohl's)
- Website: bassettplacemall.com

Bassett Place is a shopping mall in El Paso, Texas, owned and operated by Cypress Equities. It is located on El Paso's east side, at Interstate 10 and Geronimo Drive. Its anchors are Costco Wholesale, Conn's, Kohl's, Premiere Cinema IMAX and Target.

== History ==
Bassett Place was opened in 1962 as Bassett Center. It was built by The Center Companies and was the first shopping mall in El Paso. The mall drew its name from Charles N. Bassett, son of El Paso businessman Oscar T. Bassett.

The mall was fully enclosed in 1974. When it first opened, its tenants included White House Department Store, Popular Dry Goods, and Kresge.

The Popular store became Dillard's in 1995, and was torn down in 2000 to make room for Costco. That store would open on November 13, 2003. Mervyn's was converted to Kohl's a year after closing in 2008. White House was demolished for a Target Greatland and an expansion of the western side of the mall, which added more retail tenant spaces and opened in 1993. Conn's was added in 2012. In 2016, the shopping center reconfigured its food court to make room for the Dave & Buster's first El Paso location, which opened on April 11 of that year.
