= Cielo Vista Mall =

El Paso shopping mall

- Location: El Paso, Texas, United States
- Coordinates: 31.775490°N 106.379663°W
- Address: 8401 Gateway West Blvd.
- Opened: November 13, 1974; 51 years ago
- Developer: Melvin Simon & Associates
- Manager: Simon Property Group
- Owner: Simon Property Group
- Num. of stores: 117
- Num. of anchor tenants: 6
- Floor area: 1,244,987 sq ft (115,663 m^{2})
- Floors: 2 (3 in Dillard's North)
- Public transit: Sun Metro bus: 25
- Website: www.simon.com/mall/cielo-vista

Cielo Vista Mall is a shopping mall in El Paso, Texas, United States, owned and operated by Simon Property Group. It is located on El Paso's east side, at Interstate 10 and Hawkins Blvd., and features five anchor stores operating under four brand names, and 117 specialty stores. The mall anchors contain 2 Dillard’s shops, Sears, Macy’s, JCPenney, and Primark. It is the largest of the three malls in the metro area; its former sister Simon property, Sunland Park Mall, is second.

With a gross leasable area of 1,244,987 square feet (115,663 m^{2}), the mall is classified as a super-regional mall by the International Council of Shopping Centers.

== History ==
Cielo Vista Mall opened in November 13, 1974 with Dillard's, JCPenney, Montgomery Ward (demolished and rebuilt in 2002 as Foley's, now Macy's) and Rhodes. In 1978, Joske's opened on west end of the mall in the former Rhodes and later became Dillard's West in 1987. The mall's north west end expanded and Sears opened in newly added space in 1982. A parking lot structure was built on top of a small reservoir to expand the parking lot was also added about this time. Cielo Vista Mall has undergone some renovations over the years including 1982, 1993 and in 2005 being the most recent. During the 1993 and 2005 renovations most of the mall's large elaborate fountain pools and interior landscaping were removed to make room for kiosk vendors. All of the large wrap around staircases found throughout the mall were also removed in the 2005 renovation. It is approximately 10 miles (16 km) from downtown El Paso, and about five miles (8 km) from the border with Mexico. Simon claims that the mall has 10 million "shopper visits" per year.

A mass shooting occurred at a Walmart next to the mall on August 3, 2019. With 23 killed, it is one of the deadliest shootings in American history.

Another shooting occurred on February 15, 2023, with one death and three injuries. Two suspects were taken into custody. The shooting stemmed from a fight between two groups of Hispanic youths, and the one who fired the fatal shot(s) was among the wounded after being shot by a concealed carrier.

Sears leased the upper floor of their anchor space to Primark which opened a store in the mall on September 4, 2025.

== Anchors ==
- Dillard's North houses Women's departments
- Dillard's West houses Men's departments
- Sears (last store in Texas; one of last 5 locations on mainland US). Leased 2nd Floor to Primark.
- Macy’s
- JCPenney
- Primark

== Former anchors ==
- Foley's (became Macy's in 2006)
- Joske's (became Dillard's West in 1987)
- Montgomery Ward (closed in 2001, demolished for Foley's)
- Rhodes (became Joske's in 1978)
