= Cuexcomate =

Tourist attractions in Puebla

Coordinates: 19°04′14″N 98°14′07″W

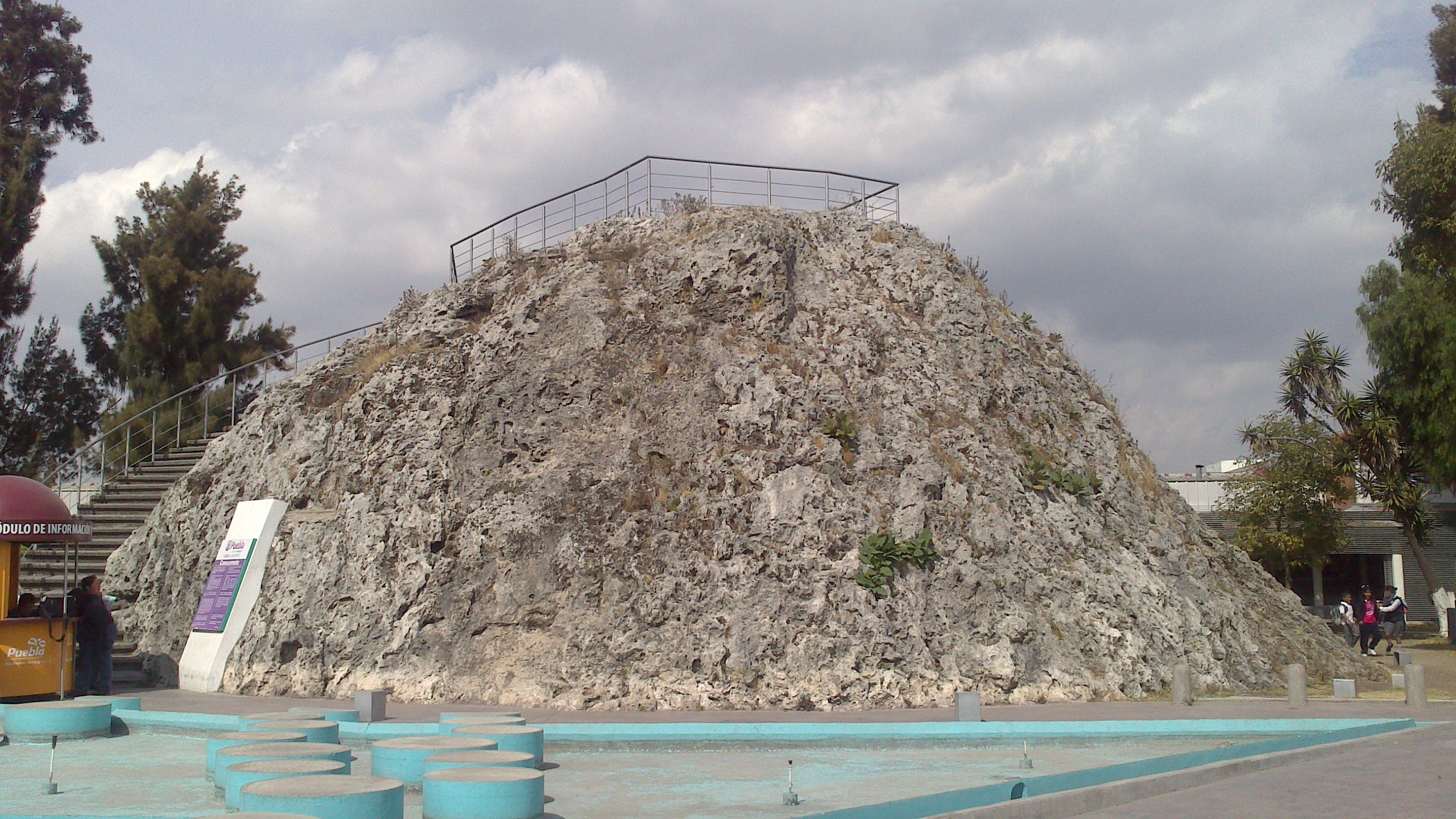
Sinter cone built by Cuexcomate geyser

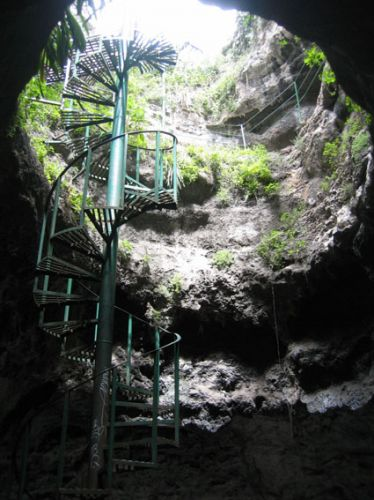
Staircase leading into the crater of Cuexcomate geyser

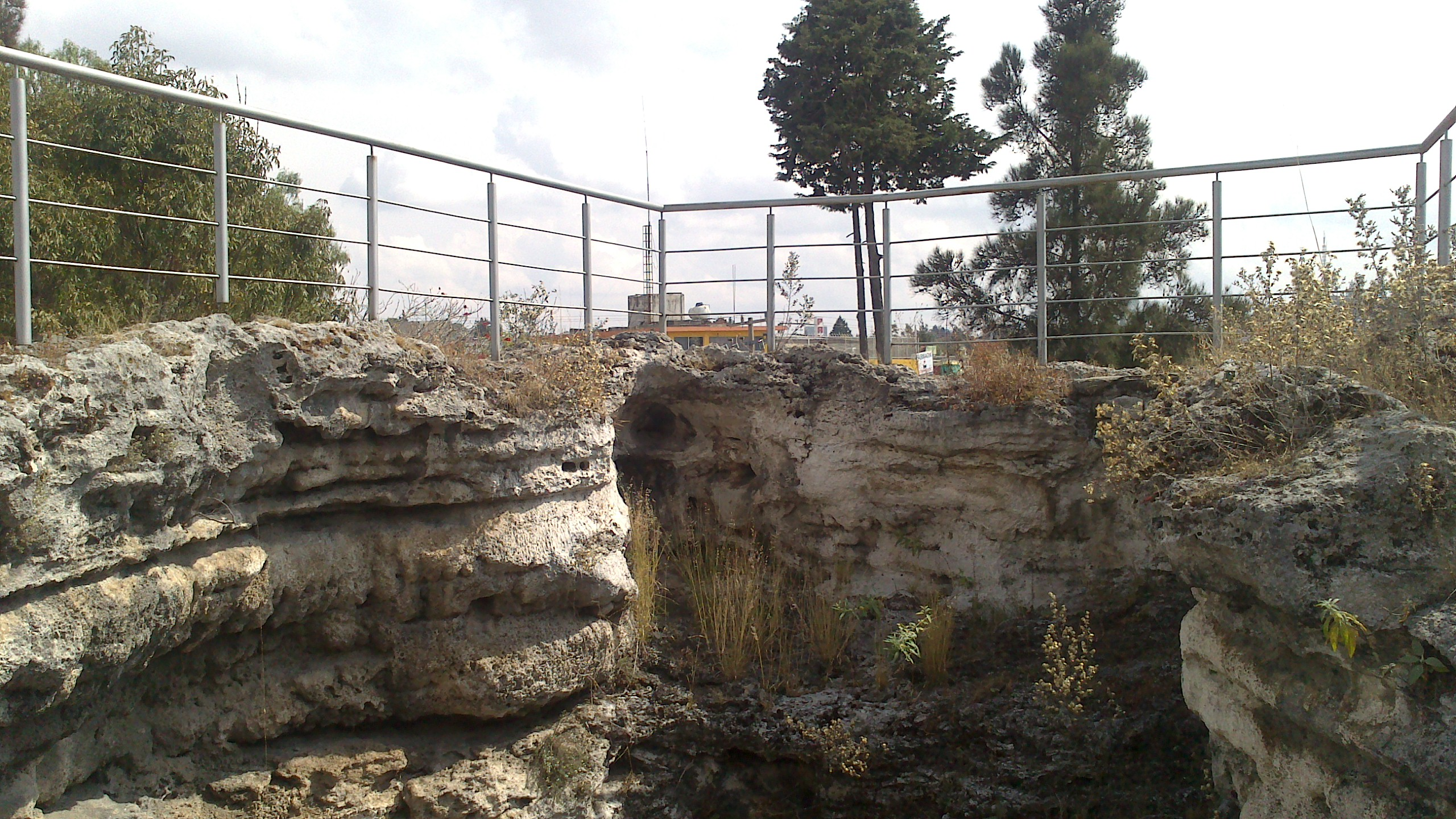
Layers in the crater walls

Cuexcomate (Spanish pronunciation: [kweɣskoˈmate]) is an inactive geyser in Puebla city, Puebla state, Mexico. The sinter cone that the geyser built up around its vent is 13 metres (43 ft) tall and has a diameter of 23 metres (75 ft). A central crater within the cone is up to 8 metres (26 ft) wide and 17 metres (56 ft) deep (extending 4 metres (13 ft) below ground level).

Cuexcomate's name is derived from the Nahuatl term cuezcomatl "a large earthen jar used to store grain", which it resembles. The geyser was formed before the 1064 eruption of the Popocatépetl, an active volcano and the second highest peak in Mexico, which likely activated geothermal spring circulation that cut upward through Mesozoic limestone and deposited the geyser and the springs around it. The geyser's rock composition is 99% calcite, differing from typical silica sinter deposits.

Cuexcomate has been mistakenly called 'the smallest volcano in the world' because of the mistaken belief that it was a volcano, based on its shape. A metal spiral staircase allows tourists to descend into the excavated interior of the structure, where cultural events are occasionally held.

== Characteristics ==
- Geyser Type: calcitic chemical deposit
- Height: 13 metres (43 ft)
- Crater Diameter: 8 metres (26 ft).
- Base Exterior Diameter: 23 metres (75 ft).
- Weight: approx. 400 tons.
- Mode of formation: emanating geothermal waters with occasional high-pressured bursts

== Description ==
A description of Cuexcomate from the year 1585 says:

"at one league from this city, close to the bridge that they call Cholula, there is in a large grassland... in circular shape, a rock of 6 or 7 estados high, at the top of which there is a great mouth as if it were made to hold a waterwheel. The which is very deep, and at the bottom of which there is foul smelling water, a very important thing to note: there they say that in the heathen days they threw in (indios) natives to be sacrificed to their idols."

The crater of Cuexcomate is an empty cone of an extinct geyser.

== History ==
Cuexcomate was formed, in an area that was to become the town of La Libertad, by hydrothermal circulation prior to the 1064 eruption of Popocatépetl. La Libertad was incorporated into the city of Puebla in 1943. On November 27, 1970, a plaque was placed to commemorate the founding of La Libertad around the sides of the Cuexcomate geyser.

It was said that in ancient times, the people of Puebla threw the bodies of suicide victims into the crater, because they did not deserve to be mourned or buried.

During this same time, the people living around the geyser were said to be 'children of the devil' or 'under the rule of the devil', because of Cuexcomate.

It is believed that of the various tunnels that cross under the city of Puebla, one runs from the hill of Loreto to the hill of San Juan (now the hill of La Paz) and from there travels down to the hill Cuexcomate, afterward crossing under the Atoyac river and ending in the Archaeological zone of Cholula and its pyramids.

== Tourism ==
The geyser is found at the intersection of 2 Poniente (west) and 3 Norte (north), in the Colonia La Libertad, Puebla.

There are spiral metal stairs that allow one to descend to the interior of the crater.
