= Kohlberg =

Kohlberg may refer to:

== Places ==
Germany

- Kohlberg, Baden-Württemberg, in the district of Esslingen
- Kohlberg, Bavaria in the district of Neustadt (Waldnaab)
- Kohlberg (Pirna), in Saxony
- Kohlberg (Fichtelgebirge), a forested mountain made of quartz phyllite in north-east Bavaria

Austria

- Kohlberg, Styria

Poland

- Kołobrzeg, in Middle Pomerania, known as Kohlberg, a.k.a. Kolberg until the end of World War II
  - Kolberg (film), 1945 German film set in and about here

== People ==
- Lawrence Kohlberg, American psychologist known for Lawrence Kohlberg's stages of moral development
- Olga Bernstein Kohlberg, American clubwoman

== Other uses ==
- Kohlberg (surname)

== See also ==
- Kohlberg Kravis Roberts, private equity firm co-founded by Jerome Kohlberg, Jr.
- Kohlberg & Company, a private equity firm
- Kolberg (disambiguation)
