= Kate Moore Brown =

American musician, clubwoman and traveler

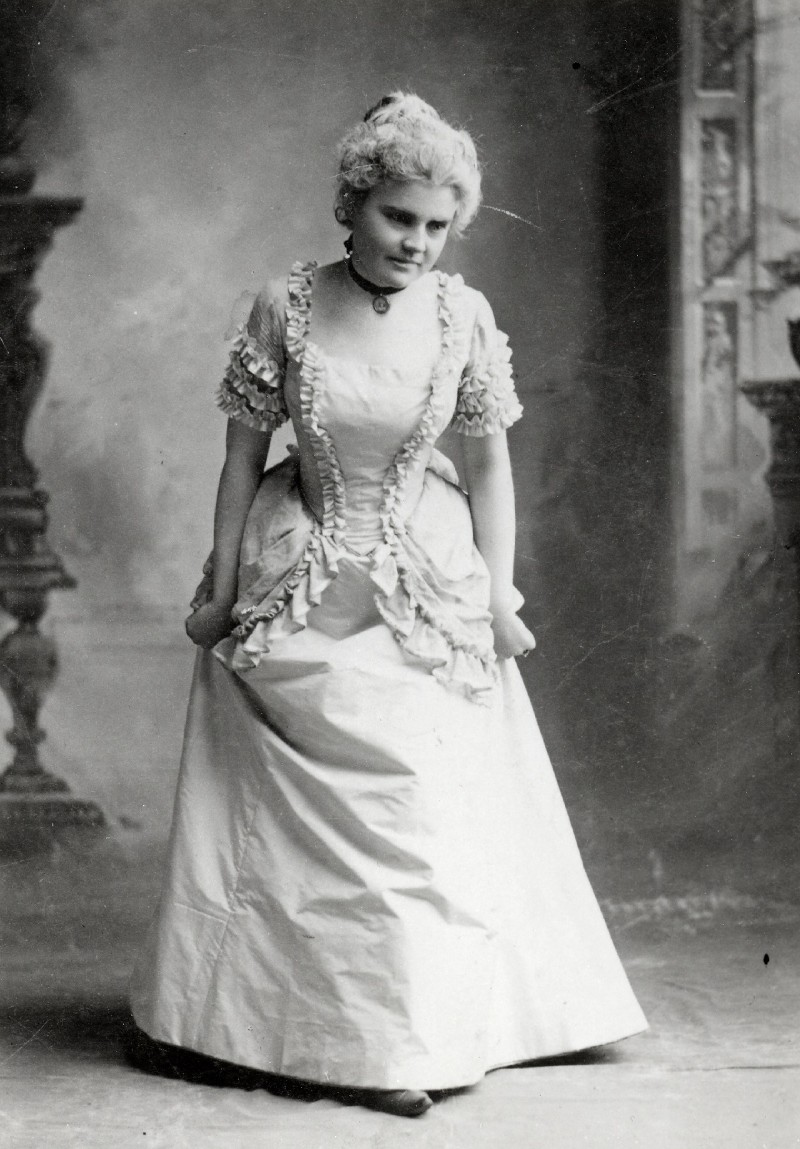
Kate Moore Brown, between 1900 and 1909

Kate Moore Brown (December 17, 1871 - March 28, 1945) was an American musician, clubwoman and traveler who lived in El Paso, Texas. Brown was one of the first graduates of El Paso High School. She was the first person to teach music in the public schools in Texas and El Paso and was the first woman to own a bicycle in El Paso. Brown is also one of the original creators of the El Paso International Museum which later became the El Paso Museum of Art.

== Biography ==
Brown was born in Missouri on December 17, 1871. She was raised in Sherman, Texas, where she took music lessons at the North Texas Female College. Brown's brother, Francis Moore, would later become a well-known pianist in New York. Brown came to El Paso in 1886 with her family. She served as a bridesmaid for Anne Buford, who married into the Magoffin family in 1887. Brown was in the first graduating class of El Paso High School, and was one of the two graduates in 1887. When she graduated, she went with her father to San Diego, California, where she received a second high school diploma from a high school there in 1889.

She returned to El Paso again in 1890, a year after her father died. She then began to teach music in the public schools and was the first person to do so in both El Paso and Texas. Brown was the first woman to own and ride a bicycle in El Paso, Texas. She used the bike to get to the schools she taught at, pedaling through sand in some places. She taught music in the public schools until 1899. She also wrote about the history of music in El Paso.

Brown married William R. Brown, a railroad agent for the Santa Fe railroad, on June 29, 1898. Her husband was a cornet player and also enjoyed music. Kate Moore Brown continued to play piano and organ and also organized various musical groups in El Paso.

Brown joined the El Paso Woman's Club in 1899. She was the head of the El Paso Woman's Club's music department. Brown was also a member of the first board of directors for the El Paso School for Girls (Radford School) in 1910. Also in 1910, Brown became the president of the Woman's Club and held meetings at her home. Later, she was on the executive board of the Texas Federation of Women's Clubs. In 1917, she formed an auxiliary of the Woman's Club devoted to music, called the MacDowell Club, named after Edward MacDowell.

Brown became the second woman elected to the El Paso School Board in 1921. She recalled later that the Ku Klux Klan attempted to infiltrate politics within the board, and she said, "I worked hard as a board member and stood for justice." She later became the state chair of Child Welfare in 1923. In 1924, Brown served as the first chairman-director of the Women's Department of the El Paso Chamber of Commerce. Brown helped originate the idea for the El Paso International Museum (later known as the El Paso Museum of Art) in 1925. She served as an organizer for the museum and worked as a chair on the board. In 1933, she was the president of the Pioneer Women's Association.

Brown's husband died in 1934. Kate Moore Brown inherited his estate.

Brown was president of the El Paso Symphony Association and helped get the organization incorporated in 1937. Brown also served on the board for the El Paso Public Library. She was president of the library board in 1936.

Brown collected the fans and shawls belonging to notable women from around the world. Brown donated her collection of over 300 fans to the El Paso International Museum. She died on March 28, 1945.
