= Sunset Heights =

- Sunset Heights Historic District
- U.S. National Register of Historic Places
- U.S. Historic district
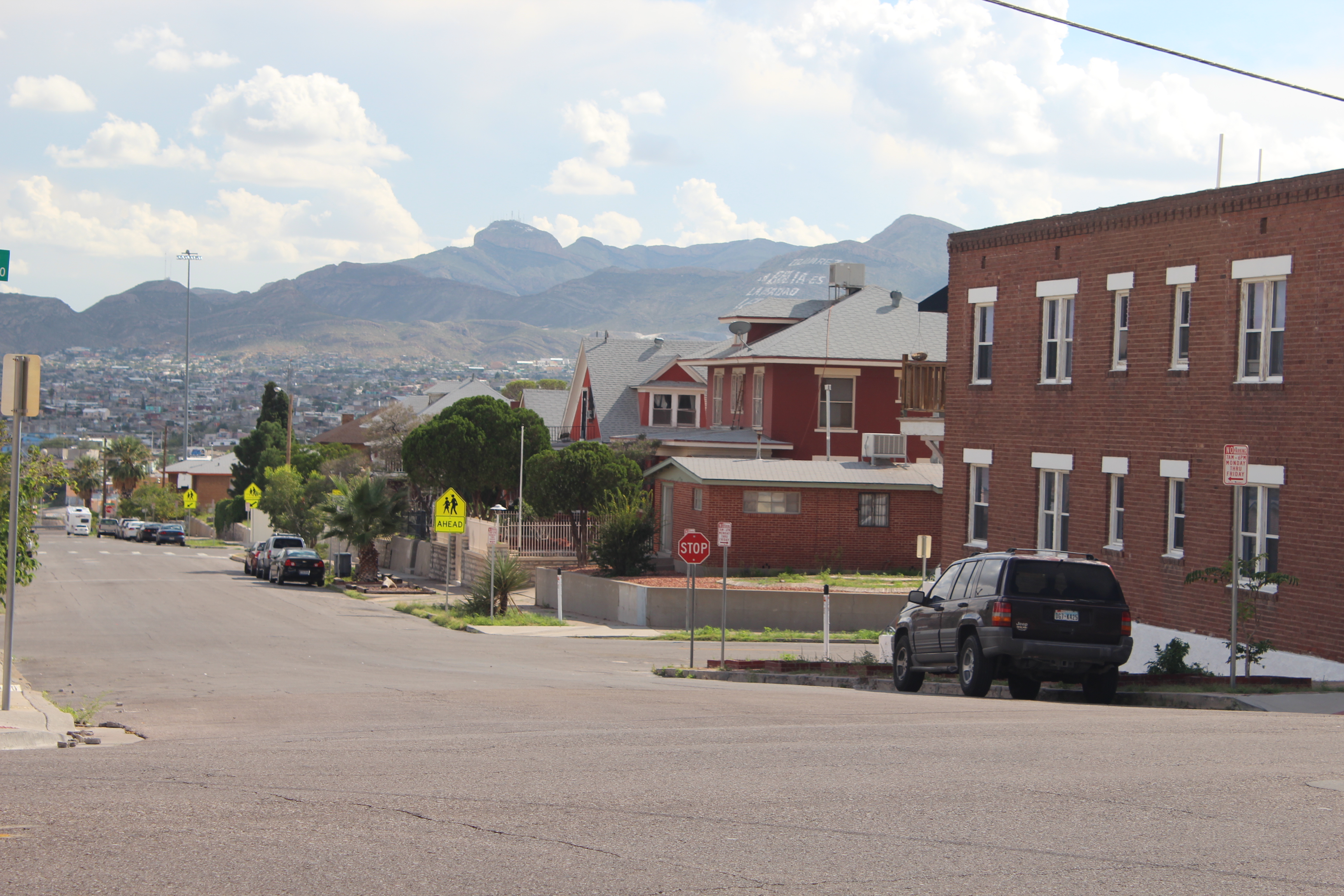
- Home in Sunset Heights

- Location within Texas Location within the United States
- Location: Roughly bounded by Heisig Ave., River Ave., N. El Paso St., and I-10, El Paso, Texas
- Coordinates: 31°45′47″N 106°29′53″W
- Area: 170 acres (69 ha)
- Architect: Henry C. Trost, et al.
- Architectural style: Tudor Revival, Mission/Spanish Revival, Classical Revival
- NRHP reference No.: 88002672
- Added to NRHP: December 8, 1988

Sunset Heights is a historic area in El Paso, Texas that has existed since the latter part of the 1890s. Many wealthy residents have had their houses and mansions built on this hill. Although some buildings have been renovated to their former glory, many have been neglected and have deteriorated. An organization, the Sunset Heights Improvement Association, helps neighbors on a fixed income to manage home maintenance and also sponsors an annual tour.

== History ==
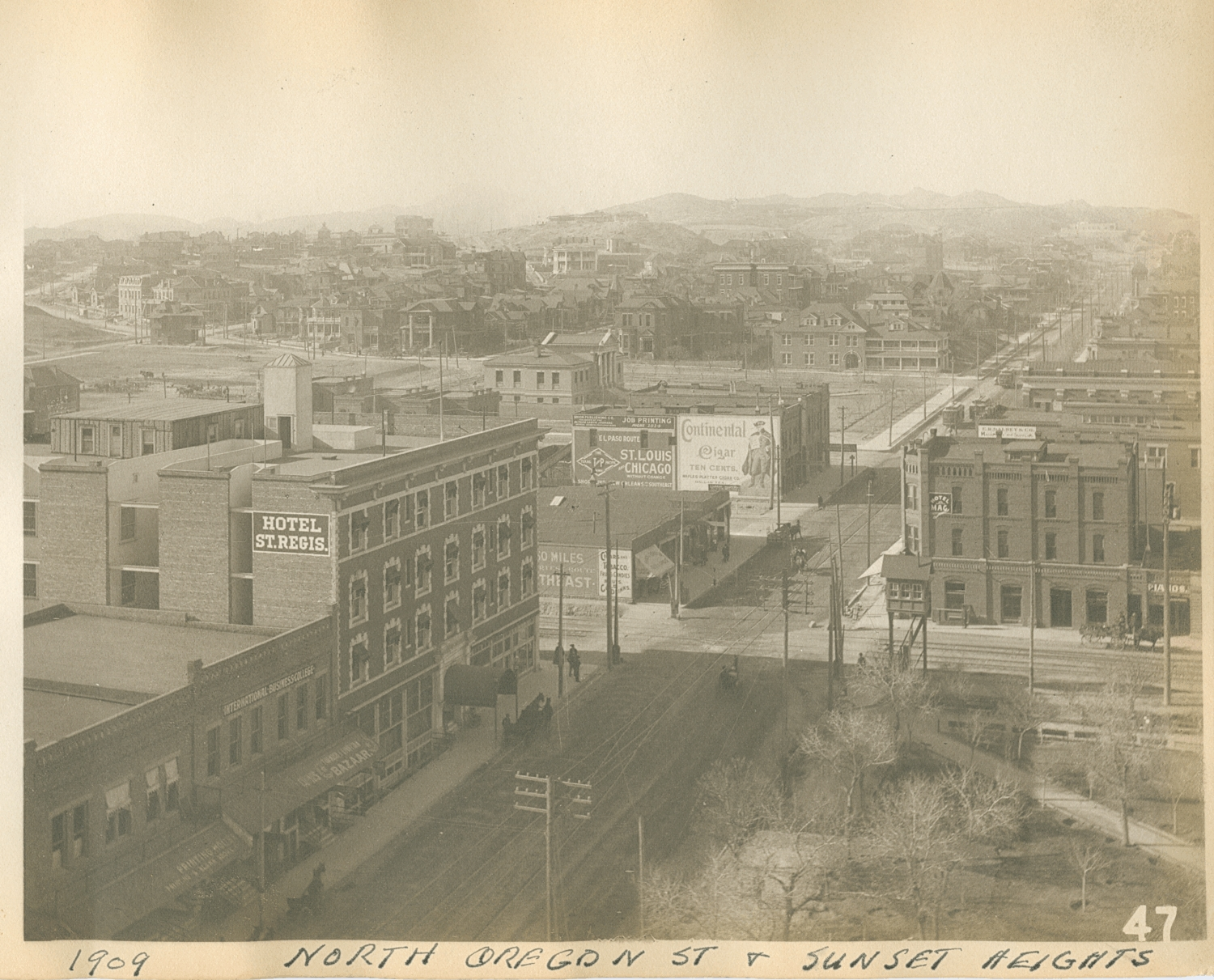
North Oregon Street and Sunset Heights, 1909.

John Fisher Satterthwaite first started purchasing land in the area in the 1880s and by 1885 had built 90 houses. The area was known as the "Satterthwaite Addition" while he owned the land. Satterthwaite lost the land he'd built in 1894.

The name, "Sunset Heights," was given to the area in 1901, after the El Paso Herald held a contest for the best name for the neighborhood.

Some buildings in Sunset Heights have remnants of tunnels underneath them which may have been started in the early 1900s. Some tunnels, including ones found under El Paso High School, may have been used to smuggle Chinese workers who were banned from the United States because of the Chinese Exclusion Act of 1882. One of the best-known tunnels is underneath the Turtle House in Sunset Heights.

During the 1910 Mexican Revolution many affluent Mexicans fled Mexico and settled in Sunset Heights. During the Mexican Revolution, the popular Mexican revolutionary leader Pancho Villa owned property and lived in the area during the 1910s. In 1915, a house designed by Trost & Trost in Sunset Heights was used as a meeting place for General Hugh Scott and Pancho Villa.

Until around the time of the Great Depression, Sunset Heights was a fashionable neighborhood.

The neighborhood was designated as a historic district in 1984, with the help of John Karr. In 2003, the Sunset Heights Neighborhood Association started giving tours of historic areas and homes called the Sunset Heights Tour.

== Cityscape ==
Because of the historic designation of the neighborhood, residents must adhere to a building code. Blocks in the neighborhood are of different shapes. Houses are designed in various styles including American Foursquare, Tudor Revival, Classical Revival, Queen Anne and Spanish Colonial Revival.

Interstate 10 serves as the southern and western border for the neighborhood. Schuster Avenue cuts it off to the north and Mesa Street is the eastern boundary.

== Education ==
Residents are zoned to the El Paso Independent School District. Mesita Elementary School serves the community with the EC/DC (ex-Villas Elementary) in Sunset Heights. The community is also zoned to Wiggs Middle School and El Paso High School.

== Notable residents ==
- Victoriano Huerta
- Olga Bernstein Kohlberg
- Beto O'Rourke
- Pascual Orozco
- J.H. Higdon
- Henry Trost
- Pancho Villa

== See also ==
- National Register of Historic Places listings in El Paso County, Texas
