= Kolberg (disambiguation) =

Kolberg, or Kołobrzeg, is a town in Poland, until 1945 part of Germany.

Kolberg may also refer to:

- Kolberg (surname)
- Kolberg (film), a 1945 Nazi propaganda film
- SMS Kolberg, a German warship from World War I
- a district of Großkarolinenfeld, Bavaria, Germany
- Kolberg, Wisconsin, an unincorporated community in Door County, USA

== See also ==
- Colberg
- Kohlberg (disambiguation)
