= Woman's Club of El Paso =

- U.S. National Register of Historic Places
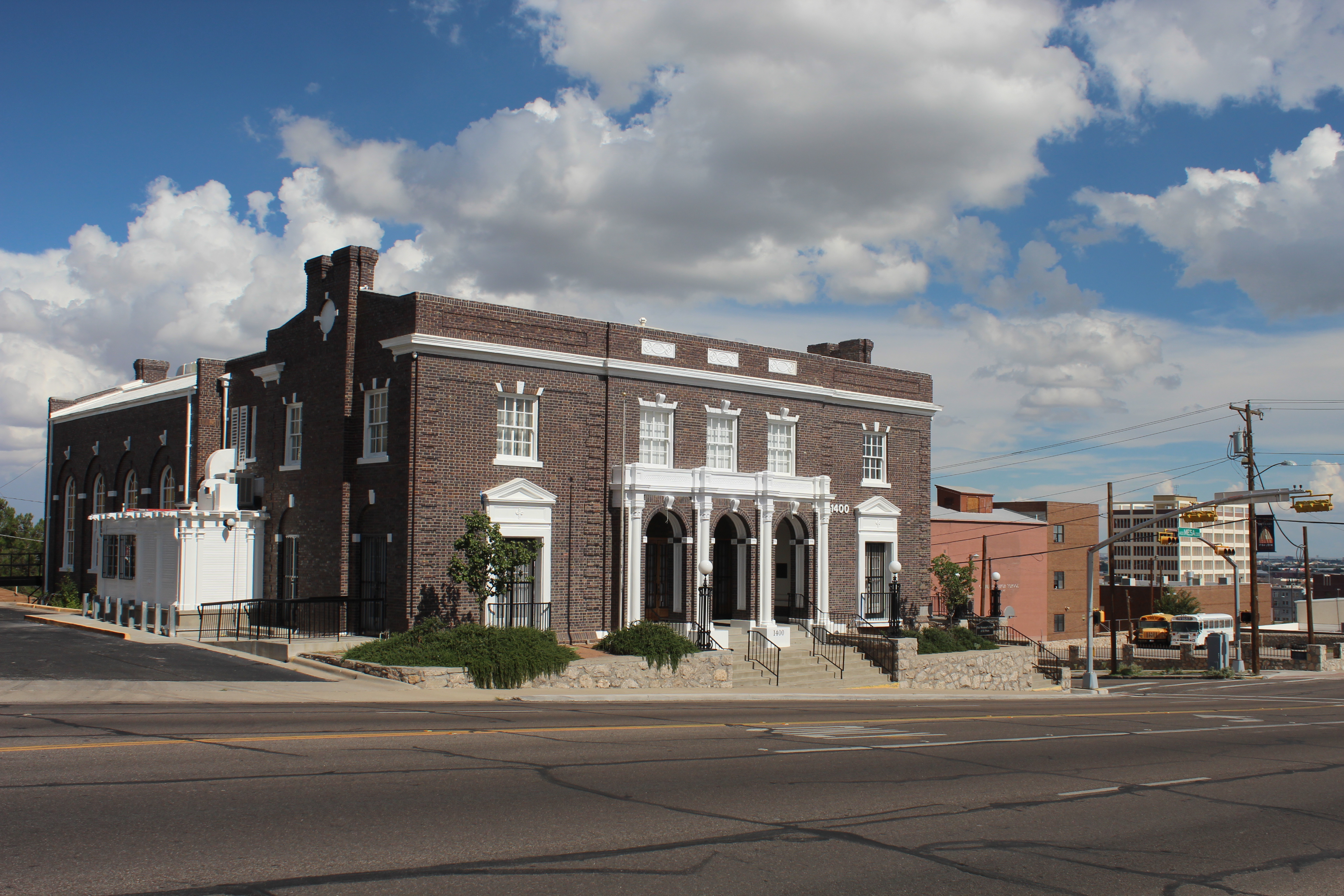
- Woman's Club Building, 2008

- Location within Texas Location within the United States
- Location: 1400 N. Mesa St., El Paso, Texas
- Coordinates: 31°46′2″N 106°29′40″W
- Area: less than one acre
- Built: 1916
- Architect: Otto Thorman
- Architectural style: Beaux Arts, Georgian
- NRHP reference No.: 79002935
- Added to NRHP: July 22, 1979

The Woman's Club of El Paso was founded in the late nineteenth century, and during that time was the only woman's organization in El Paso, Texas. The Woman's Club also allowed women in El Paso to become involved in community service and activism. The building which is the home for the club is located on 1400 N. Mesa Drive, and was erected in 1916. The club, now a non-profit organization, traces its official origins back to 1894, and continues to provide an "educational and cultural center for its members." The building is registered in the National Register of Historic Places.

== History ==
Mary Hamilton Mills arrived in El Paso with her husband, William Wallace Mills on March 8, 1869. Mills began to create a social circle, which started to meet in 1881 and included Flora Hague, Octavia Magoffin, Olga Kohlberg, Eugenia Schuster, Carrie Fewel, Lemire Morehead, Elizabeth Irvin, Margaret Beall, Eliza Berrien, Laura Loomis, Carrie Race, Maude Austin, Harriet Shelton, Frances McCutcheon, Rebecca Falvey, Mary Voss, Carrie Sutherland and other important women in El Paso. Members of the group met at various locations in El Paso. First, they called the group the Child Culture Study Circle. The club was organized in 1894, first meeting in Mills' home on San Francisco Street. Mills was the unofficial president until 1895, when she was officially elected as president of the club, which was known at the time as The Current Topics Club. The club later changed its name to the Woman's Club of El Paso in 1899.

The Woman's Club decided to create a permanent building for the club in 1915, raising club dues and appealing to local businesses for donations in order to get funding. The clubhouse was designed by the architect, Otto H. Thorman and construction began in 1916. The building was the first free-standing woman's clubhouse in the state of Texas. The clubhouse was officially opened on November 8, 1916.

=== Community service ===
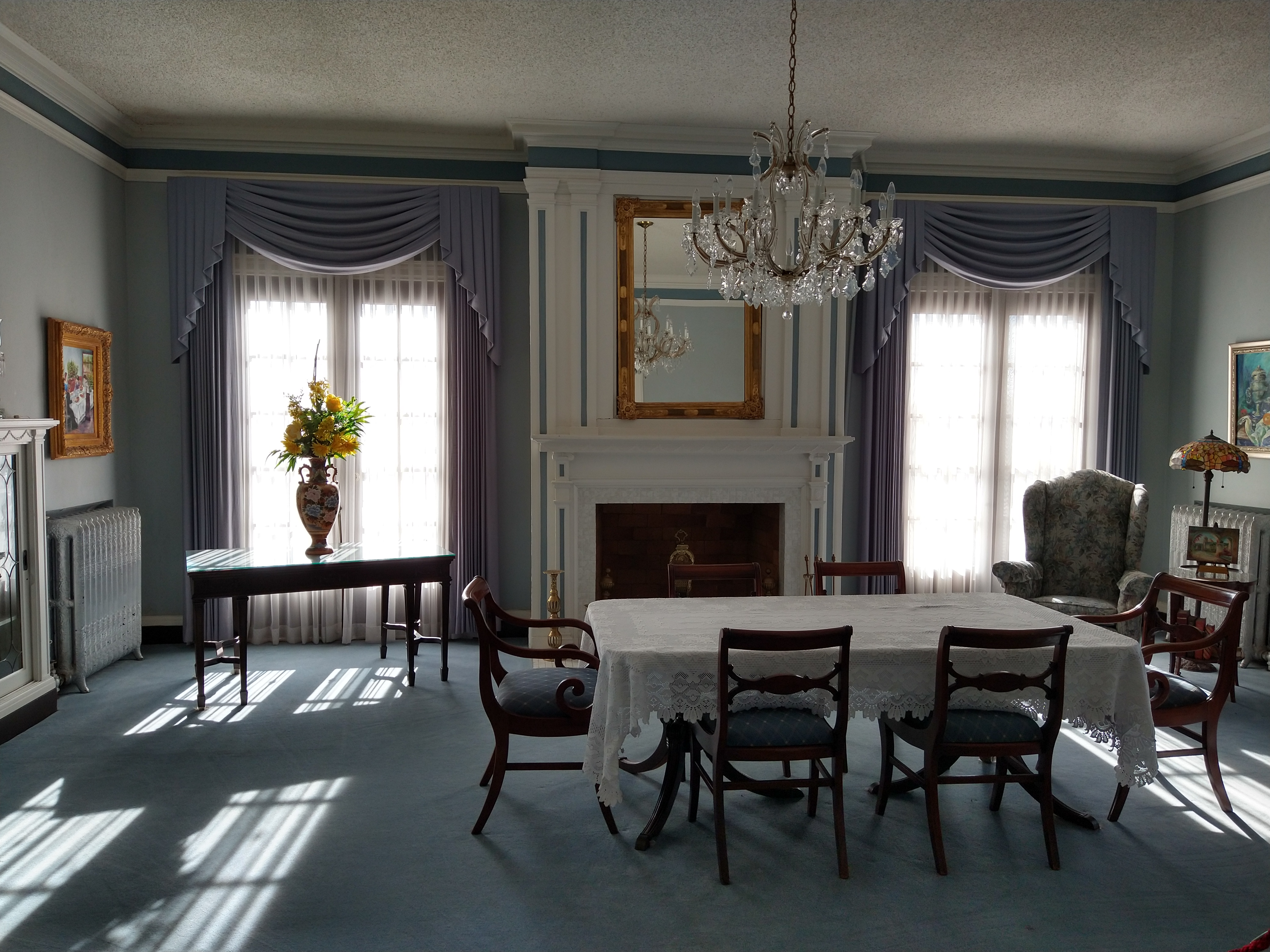
Women's Club of El Paso interior.

Members of the Woman's Club were involved in the establishment of Texas's first public school kindergarten. The club, led by one of the Woman's Club presidents, Olga Kohlberg, worked to get a kindergarten established in the first school building in El Paso, Central School, in 1893. Kohlberg also helped establish the first hospital in El Paso, by creating the Ladies' Benevolent Association. Members of the club were also heavily involved in establishing the El Paso Public Library. Mary Irene Stanton, who was the first president of the El Paso Library Association in 1895, was elected the Woman's Club vice-president that same year. Stanton created the first children's library in the United States. By 1913, El Paso had "over thirty women's organizations," though most were social in nature, and contrasted with the "civic and humanitarian objectives" of the Woman's Club. Another president of the club, Eugenia Schuster, helped refugees from the Mexican Revolution in 1916, working with Amigos Listos. The club worked to get safe food and public sanitation laws passed and also worked to protect San Jacinto Plaza.

== Services ==
The Woman's Club of El Paso hosts annually a Fall Festival to raise money for the preservation of the clubhouse, a holiday Wassail party and also a Spring Celebration. Auxiliary groups to the Woman's Club are the Arts and Crafts Study Club, the Book Club and the Junior Woman's Club of El Paso. The Junior Woman's Club was founded 1934 and works with local charities to help improve the community of El Paso. The club's building can be used as a venue for local events. The club also "regularly features and supports local artists."

== Notable members ==
- Kate Moore Brown, served as president.
- Olga Kohlberg, served as president.
- Eugenia Schuster, served as president.

== See also ==
- National Register of Historic Places listings in El Paso County, Texas
- Recorded Texas Historic Landmarks in El Paso County

== Bibliography ==
- Cunningham, Mary S. (1978). The Woman's Club of El Paso: Its First Thirty Years. El Paso, Texas: Texas Western Press. ISBN 0874040612.
