= Eugenia Schuster =

American activist in El Paso, Texas

Eugenia Mananyi Schuster (1865–1946) was a community activist in El Paso, Texas, and one of the presidents of the Woman's Club of El Paso. She was also the founder of the El Paso Pan-American Round Table.

== Biography ==
Schuster was born in the Austrian Empire. She was educated in Vienna and studied piano with Franz Liszt. She met her husband, Michael P. Schuster, in Vienna and together they had four children. The family moved to the United States in 1891, where her husband worked as a physician in Kansas City. Schuster and her family arrived in El Paso in 1894. Her husband worked as doctor for the American Smelting and Refining Company (ASARCO). Along with her husband and others, Schuster established the old Providence Hospital in 1902. She served as president of the Woman's Club of El Paso in 1904. Schuster and her husband lived in a 2-story house designed by Henry Trost.

Schuster and Mrs. Alberto Matero both became involved with Amigos Listos in 1916 in order to provide aid to refugees of the Mexican Revolution.

Schuster founded the Pan American Round Table in 1921 "at the request of the Consul-General in Washington, D.C." The round table was part of the Good Neighbor Policy and Schuster's group in El Paso was the second to be formed, the first being in San Antonio. The round table is a women's organization which provides educational opportunities, social events, study groups and the celebration of Pan American Day on April 14. Schuster served as the first director of the round table.

Schuster was also involved in supporting the El Paso Public Library and helped to get Cleveland Square recognized as a park.
