= Louis Daeuble Jr. =

American architect

- Born: June 7, 1912; Leavenworth, Kansas, U.S.
- Died: October 5, 1992 (aged 80); El Paso, Texas, U.S.
- Education: El Paso High School; Texas A&M University
- Occupation: Architect
- Spouse: Margaret Elizabeth Barron
- Children: 2 sons, 1 daughter

Louis Daeuble Jr. (June 7, 1912 - October 5, 1992) was an American architect who designed many buildings in El Paso, Texas.

== Life ==
Daeuble was born on June 7, 1912, in Leavenworth, Kansas. He graduated from El Paso High School and Texas A&M University.

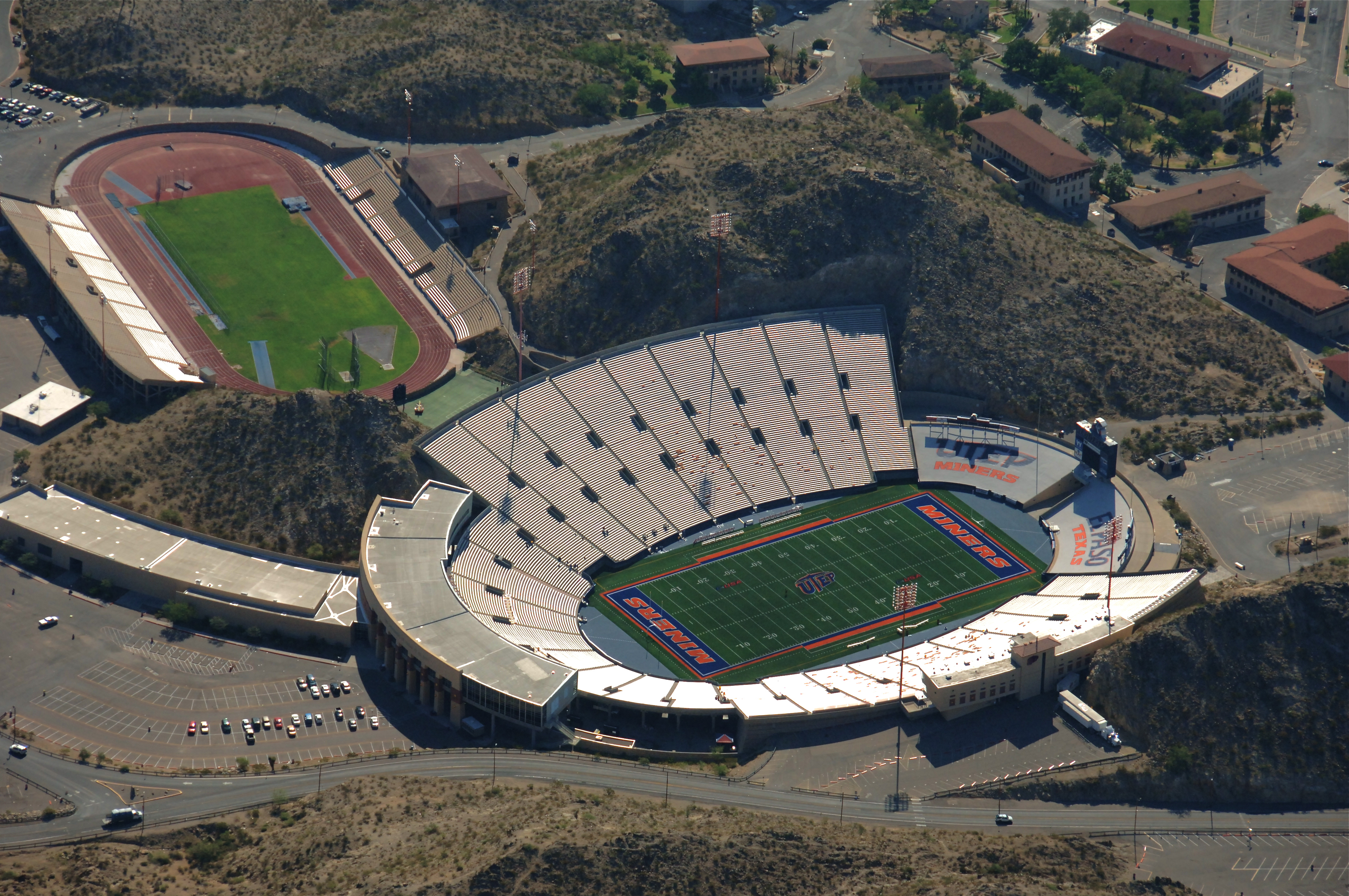
The Sun Bowl Stadium, designed by Carroll and Daeuble.

Daeuble began his career as a draftsman for architect Percy W. McGhee. From 1945 to 1977, he was a partner in Carroll and Daeuble, later known as Carroll, Daeuble, DuSang and Rand, and he maintained his own practice from 1977 to 1990. He helped design many buildings in El Paso, Texas, including the El Paso Museum of Art, the El Paso Public Library, the El Paso Civic Center and the Sun Bowl Stadium. He also designed the Liberal Arts Building on the campus of the University of Texas at El Paso, and places of worship like the First Presbyterian Church and Temple Mount Sinai in El Paso.

With his wife, nee Margaret Elizabeth Barron, Daeuble had two sons and a daughter. He died on October 5, 1992, in El Paso, Texas.
