= Kohlberg (surname) =

Kohlberg is a surname. Notable people with the surname include:

- Alfred Kohlberg (1887–1960), American businessman and anti-communist
- Andy Kohlberg (born 1959), American tennis player
- Benny Kohlberg (born 1954), Swedish cross-country skier
- Jerome Kohlberg, Jr., (1925-2015), American financier
- Lawrence Kohlberg, (1927–1987) developmental psychologist
- Olga Bernstein Kohlberg (1864–1935), German-American philanthropist
- Yaron Kohlberg (born 1983), Israeli pianist
