= Philip J. Rasch =

- Born: December 3, 1909; Grand Rapids, Michigan, US
- Died: October 3, 1995 (aged 85); Ojai, California, US
- Occupations: Historian; Author; Researcher; Physiologist
- Years active: 1947–1995

Philip J. Rasch (1909–1995) was a physiologist, a writer of Western history and the author of several publications, notably about Billy the Kid, and the Lincoln County War.

== Career ==
Philip John Rasch was born December 3, 1909, in Grand Rapids, Michigan, and served in the U. S. Navy on a submarine chaser in the Pacific during World War II. The extensive detail of Rasch's early research of the Old West, can be found in his 1948 article: Red Hair and Outlawry

== Publications ==
- Red hair and outlawry, by Philip J. Rasch; Hans von Hentig, 1947
- New Light on the Legend of Billy the Kid, New Mexico Folklore Record, 6 (1953), 1–5. Philip J. Rasch and Robert N. Mullin.
- Dim Trails: The Pursuit of the McCarty Family, New Mexico Folklore Record, 8 (1954), 6–11. Philip J. Rasch and Robert N. Mullin.
- The rise of the house of Murphy, by Philip J. Rasch, 1956
- Feuding at Farmington, by Philip J. Rasch, 1965
- An incomplete account of "Bronco Bill" Walters, by Philip J. Rasch, 1977
- Kinesiology and applied anatomy, by Philip J. Rasch, 1989
- Trailing Billy the Kid, by Philip J. Rasch; Robert K. DeArment, 1995
- Gunsmoke in Lincoln County, by Philip J. Rasch; Robert K. DeArment, 1997
- Warriors of Lincoln County, by Philip J. Rasch; Robert K. DeArment, 1998
- Desperadoes of Arizona Territory, by Philip J. Rasch; Robert K. DeArment, 1999
- A note on Buckskin Frank Leslie, by Philip J. Rasch, not dated
