= El Paso International Airport =

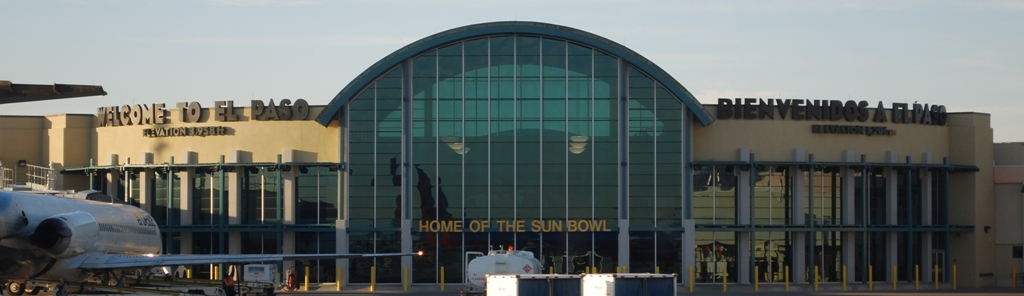
- IATA: ELP; ICAO: KELP; FAA LID: ELP

Summary
- Airport type: Public
- Owner: City of El Paso
- Operator: El Paso Aviation Department
- Serves: El Paso, Texas, U.S.; Las Cruces, New Mexico, U.S.; Ciudad Juárez, Chihuahua, Mexico
- Location: El Paso, Texas, U.S.
- Opened: 1928; 98 years ago
- Elevation AMSL: 3,961.6 ft (1,207.5 m)
- Coordinates: 31°48′26″N 106°22′39″W
- Website: elpasointernationalairport.com

Maps
- FAA airport diagram
- Interactive map of El Paso International Airport

Runways
Direction	Length		Surface
Direction	ft	m	Surface
04/22	12,020	3,664	Asphalt
08R/26L	9,025	2,751	Asphalt
08L/26R	5,499	1,670	Concrete

Statistics (2025)
- Total passengers: 3,838,968 ▼4.9%
- Aircraft operations: 94,499
- Cargo (in tons): 83,182.6
- Source: Federal Aviation Administration

El Paso International Airport (EPIA, (IATA: ELP, ICAO: KELP, FAA LID: ELP), Spanish: Aeropuerto Internacional de El Paso) is an international airport located four miles (6 km) northeast of downtown El Paso, in El Paso County, Texas, United States. It is the busiest commercial airport serving West Texas, Southern New Mexico and North Central Mexico. It handled 4,038,530 passengers in 2024, a passenger record for ELP, with 97,737 aircraft operations.

== History ==
The City of El Paso built the first El Paso Municipal Airport near the east side of the Franklin Mountains in 1928. Alderman Robert N. Mullin was credited as the person responsible for getting the airport built. The airport was closed by 1945 and in more recent times has been home to the Jobe Concrete Products "Planeport" cement factory.

In 1934, Varney Speed Lines (now United Airlines) operated at the original El Paso Municipal Airport (now closed). The original El Paso Municipal Airport construction was inspired by a visit from Charles Lindbergh.

What became today's El Paso International Airport was built as Standard Airport by Standard Airlines in 1929 for transcontinental air mail service. Standard Airlines became a division of American Airlines in the 1930s. In 1936, American Airlines "swapped" airports with the City of El Paso, and El Paso International Airport was born.

During World War II, the airport was a United States Army Air Forces training base. Units which trained at El Paso Army Airfield were:

- 385th Bombardment Group (Heavy) (B-17 Flying Fortress) December 21, 1942 – February 1, 1943
  - Served with the 8th Air Force in England.
- 491st Bombardment Group (Heavy) (B-24 Liberator) November 11, 1943 – January 1, 1944
  - Served with the 8th Air Force in England.
- 497th Bombardment Group (Very Heavy) (B-29 Superfortress) November 20 – December 1, 1943
  - Served with the 20th Air Force at Saipan.

On August 3, 1961, El Paso was the last stop of the first major US hijacking of a jetliner, a Boeing 707 owned by Continental Airlines.

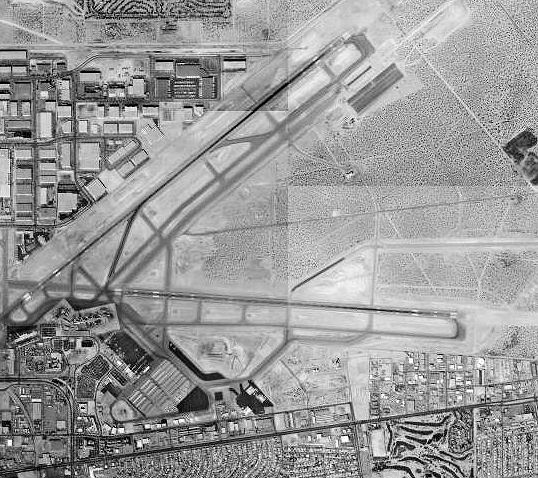
ELP in 1996

An expansion that tripled the size of the terminal occurred in 1971. A new structure for ticketing and bag claim was built in front of the old terminal and two passenger concourses were built behind the old terminal, retaining the old terminal in the middle, the outline of which can still be recognized today. It was designed by Garland & Hilles.

Serving general aviation at El Paso International Airport, Cutter Aviation established a fixed-base operation in 1982. Cutter Aviation moved to a new facility on Shuttle Columbia Drive in 2006. Atlantic Aviation also serves general aviation at ELP.

=== Historical airline service ===
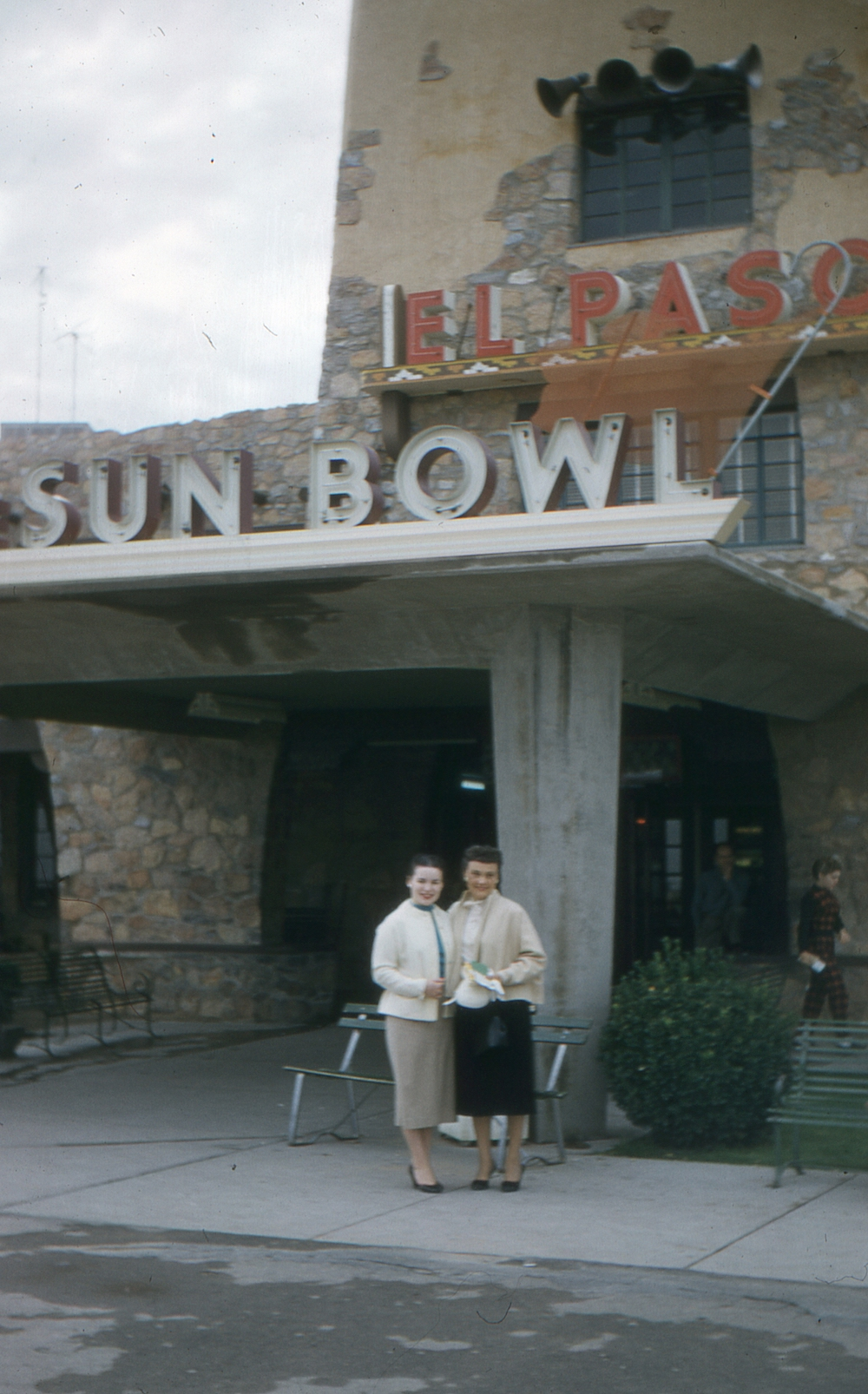
Terminal entrance in 1957

Standard Air Lines began the first scheduled commercial passenger and mail service to El Paso on February 4, 1928, with a route to Los Angeles making stops in Douglas, Tucson, and Phoenix, Arizona. The carrier began using a Fokker F-7 aircraft and soon upgraded to a Fokker F-10 trimotor. Maddux Air Lines soon followed beginning service on February 23, 1929, with nearly the same route as Standard Air Lines however Maddux continued on from Los Angeles to San Francisco. Maddux used a Ford trimotor aircraft but the service ended later in 1929 by the time of the great stock market crash. Western Air Express replaced Standard on the route to Los Angeles for a short time in 1930 and extended service eastward from El Paso to Dallas stopping at Big Spring, Abilene, and Fort Worth, Texas. American Airways then took over the route beginning on October 15, 1930, and later extended the route eastward all the way to New York, stopping at Little Rock, Memphis, Nashville, and Washington D.C. as well as several other points. The carrier changed its name to American Airlines in 1934. Douglas DC-3 aircraft were primarily used in the latter 1930s through 1940s followed by Convair 240's and Douglas DC-6's in the 1950s. A new route to Monterrey and Mexico City, Mexico was flown from 1943 through 1957 and direct service to San Francisco was added in 1948. Through the 1950s, American partnered with Continental Airlines offering an interchange service where American's flights from Los Angeles and San Francisco, stopping in Phoenix, would continue eastward through El Paso as Continental's flights to San Antonio and Houston using the same Douglas DC-6 aircraft. The interchange flights ended in 1961 when American received its own authority to serve the El Paso-San Antonio-Houston route. American Boeing 707 and Boeing 727 jets began serving El Paso in the early 1960s and widebody Douglas DC-10 jets began service on nonstop flights to Dallas in 1972. The stop at Douglas, Arizona, on westbound flights ended in the mid-1960s and new nonstop service to Chicago was added in 1969. Direct flights to San Antonio, Houston, Tucson, and San Francisco ended after airline deregulation in 1978 and American's service to Dallas, Chicago, Phoenix, and Los Angeles continues today.

From 1929 to 1931, Mid-Continent Air Express operated a route from El Paso to Denver stopping at Albuquerque, Santa Fe, Las Vegas, NM, Pueblo, and Colorado Springs. From 1931 through 1934, Western Air Express took over this route and extended it onto Cheyenne, WY.

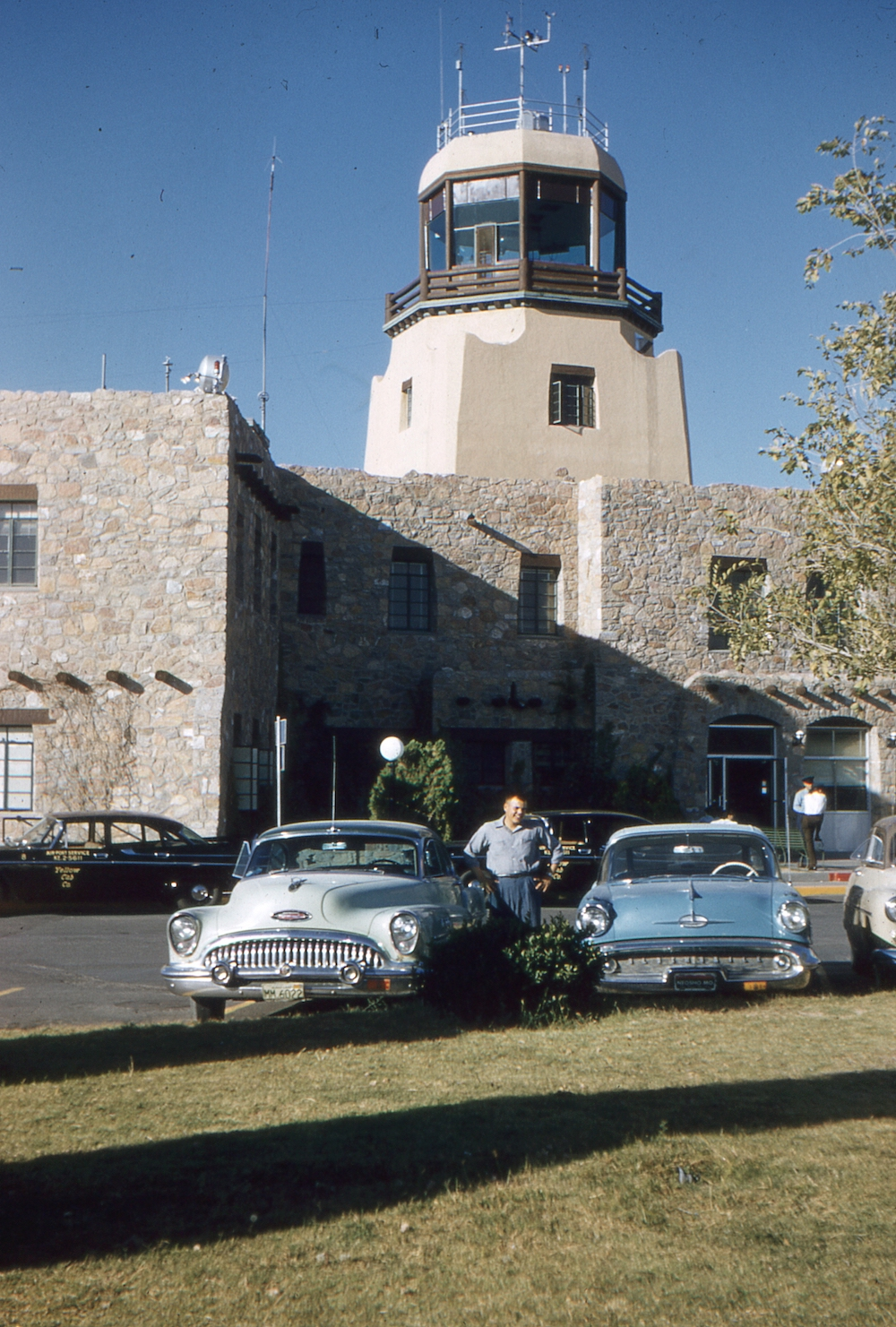
Control Tower in 1957

Continental Airlines was the second major airline to serve El Paso. The carrier began as Varney Speed Lines in 1934 operating the northerly route from El Paso but only to Pueblo, Colorado, with stops at Albuquerque and several other points in New Mexico and Colorado. The name was changed to Continental Air Lines in 1937 and the route was extended back to Denver. A new route to Carlsbad, Hobbs, and Roswell, New Mexico, was added in 1940 followed by new routes to San Antonio and to Kansas City with several stops by the mid-1940s. Continental primarily used Lockheed Model 10 Electra and Lockheed Model 18 Lodestar aircraft in the 1930s followed by Douglas DC-3's in the 1940s. Larger Convair 240, Convair 340, and Douglas DC-6 aircraft were introduced in the 1950s followed by the Vickers Viscount by 1959. The San Antonio route was extended to Houston by the early 1950s at which time Continental partnered with American Airlines to offer interchange service from Houston and San Antonio to Los Angeles and San Francisco by way of El Paso. Service to Alamogordo, New Mexico, was added in 1954 but discontinued in 1963, transferring the route to Frontier Airlines. New nonstop service to Dallas began in 1959, and in the early 1960s Continental received its own authority to operate westbound from El Paso to Los Angeles with stops in Tucson and Phoenix. Jet service began in the early 1960s with Boeing 707 and Boeing 720 jets on the Los Angeles-El Paso-Houston route which also made stops at Phoenix, Tucson, Midland and San Antonio. Douglas DC-9 jets arrived in 1966 which began jet service on the routes to Dallas, Albuquerque and Denver, and also the route to Kansas City that stopped in Midland, Lubbock, and Wichita Falls, Texas, as well as Lawton, Oklahoma City, and Tulsa, Oklahoma. The service to the smaller cities in southeastern New Mexico ended in 1963 (retiring the DC-3 aircraft) and was transferred to Trans Texas Airlines. Continental was operating all jets by 1967 and El Paso became a small hub through the 1970s with up to five flights on the ground at a time using a new rotunda shaped gate area on the end of the east concourse. A widebody Douglas DC-10 was operated on a Los-Angeles-El Paso-San Antonio-Houston flight, eastbound only, in the latter 1970s. Service to the Mexican resort cities of Acapulco, La Paz, Los Cabos, Manzanillo, and Puerto Vallarta was operated from 1979 through 1981. After airline deregulation in 1978, Continental slowly downsized its El Paso operation to flights only serving its hubs at Denver and Houston. For a few years in the early 1990s, nonstop flights to Mexico City were operated. Continental Express service to Alamogordo, Carlsbad, and Roswell, New Mexico, was briefly operated in 1987. The Denver flights ended in 1994 and new Continental Express service with regional jets began replacing Continental's mainline jets to Houston in the 2000s. Continental merged into United Airlines in 2012.

Trans-Texas Airways was the third carrier to serve El Paso. Trans-Texas began operating in 1947 solely within the state of Texas and El Paso was the western terminus for flights from Dallas and Houston that made many stops at small communities throughout central and west Texas. Trans-Texas operated Douglas DC-3 aircraft and flights from El Paso would stop at Marfa, Alpine, Pecos, Ft. Stockton, and several other communities. In 1963, new routes were established to Carlsbad, Hobbs, and Roswell, New Mexico while the initial routes to most of the small Texas cities were discontinued. Larger Convair 240 and Convair 600 aircraft replaced the DC-3's in the mid-1960s. In 1969 the carrier changed its name to Texas International Airlines and new Douglas DC-9 jets began flights from El Paso to Houston making stops in Midland, San Angelo and Austin. These flights ended in 1971. For the next several years only a single flight to Carlsbad, Hobbs, Big Spring, Brownwood, and Dallas was operated using a Convair-600. A DC-9 jet flight to Dallas, stopping in Roswell and Midland, operated for a period in 1975. All service to El Paso ended in 1977 but was reinstated in 1980 when nonstop jet flights to Dallas began. Texas International merged into Continental Airlines in 1982 at which time the Dallas flights ended.

Frontier Airlines (1950-1986) began a route from El Paso to Phoenix in 1950 that made stops in Las Cruses, Deming, Silver City and Lordsburg, New Mexico, as well as Clifton, Safford, Globe and Superior, Arizona. Douglas DC-3 aircraft were used and the service ended in 1955. Frontier returned to El Paso in 1963 with a route to Alamogordo and Albuquerque, New Mexico, which eventually continued to Salt Lake City. Convair 580 aircraft were used on this route and in 1967 Frontier began nonstop flights to Albuquerque and onto Denver with Boeing 727 jets. The 727's were later swapped out with Boeing 737-200 jets and new service to several points in Mexico was established from 1978 through 1984. These Mexican destinations included Guadalajara, Ixtapa-Zihuatanejo, Manzanillo, Mazatlán, and Puerto Vallarta. Frontier ceased operating in 1986, and a new Frontier Airlines was established in 1994 with Boeing 737 flights to Albuquerque and Denver.

Southwest Airlines began flights from El Paso to Dallas, Lubbock, and Midland/Odessa in 1977 using Boeing 737-200's and continually added new service, becoming the largest carrier at El Paso by the early 1980s. Delta Air Lines and United Airlines also began service in the 1980s.

Since airline deregulation went into effect in late 1978, many other carriers have served El Paso including Eastern Airlines, Western Airlines, America West Airlines, USAir, Northwest Airlines, TWA, Aerolitoral (feeder carrier for AeroMexico), and Lineas Aereas Azteca. At least 15 smaller commuter airlines have also provided service to points in southern New Mexico, southeast Arizona, and to Chihuahua, Mexico, from the 1960s through the 1990s.

=== 2026 airspace closure ===
On the night of February 10, 2026, without any advance warning, the Federal Aviation Administration (FAA) announced that most of El Paso's airspace would be closed to all civil aviation for 10 days, which effectively shut down El Paso International to the alarm of local leaders. The FAA said the restriction was enacted for "special security reasons" but did not state the underlying justification. At 7 a.m. on February 11, less than eight hours after it was imposed, the FAA lifted the temporary flight restriction and said it was prompted by a "cartel drone incursion". This was the first sudden closure of US airspace for security reasons since the September 11 attacks in 2001. The episode resulted in the cancellation of seven arriving and seven departing passenger flights.

A Trump administration statement that a cartel drone was shot down could not be independently corroborated. The Associated Press and The New York Times reported that the FAA imposed the restriction because US Customs and Border Protection (CBP) used an experimental laser weapon loaned from the US military to shoot down what was believed to be a drone but was later revealed to be a party balloon. According to anonymous government sources, the FAA was unconvinced that the weapon would not harm civil aircraft, and issued the restriction after the Department of Defense (DOD, also called the Department of War) refused to coordinate with the FAA. The DOD and Department of Homeland Security (the parent agency of CBP) declined to comment.

== Facilities ==
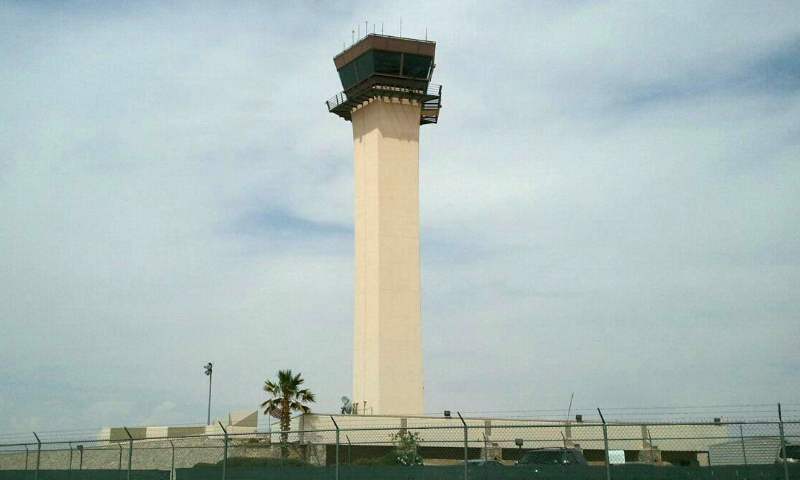
Air traffic control tower

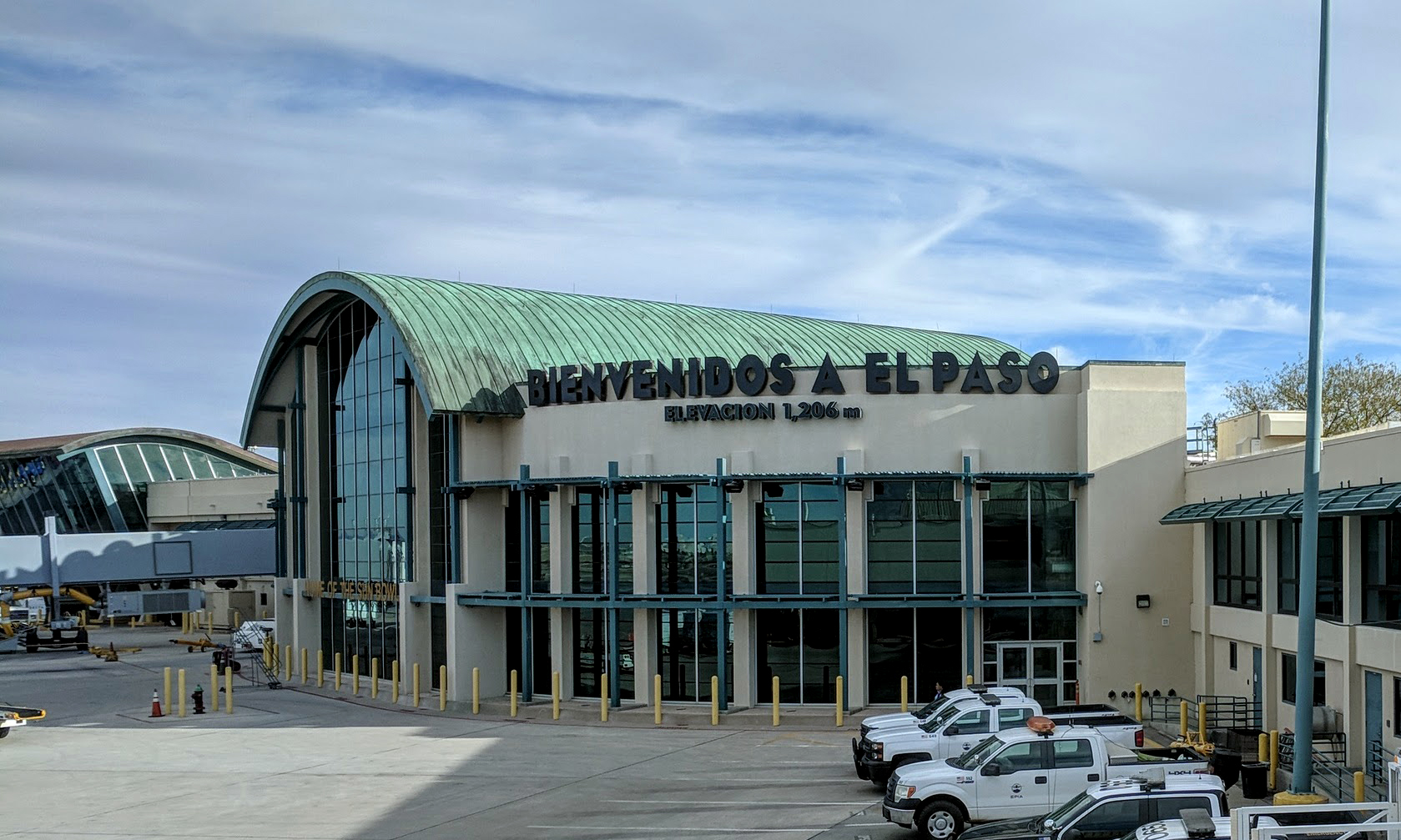
El Paso International Airport arrivals and security hall, from an aircraft at the A concourse

El Paso International Airport covers 6,670 acres (2,699 ha) and has three runways:

- 4/22: 12,020 ft × 150 ft (3,664 m × 46 m), asphalt
- 8R/26L: 9,025 ft × 150 ft (2,751 m × 46 m), asphalt
- 8L/26R: 5,499 ft × 75 ft (1,676 m × 23 m), concrete

=== Main terminal ===
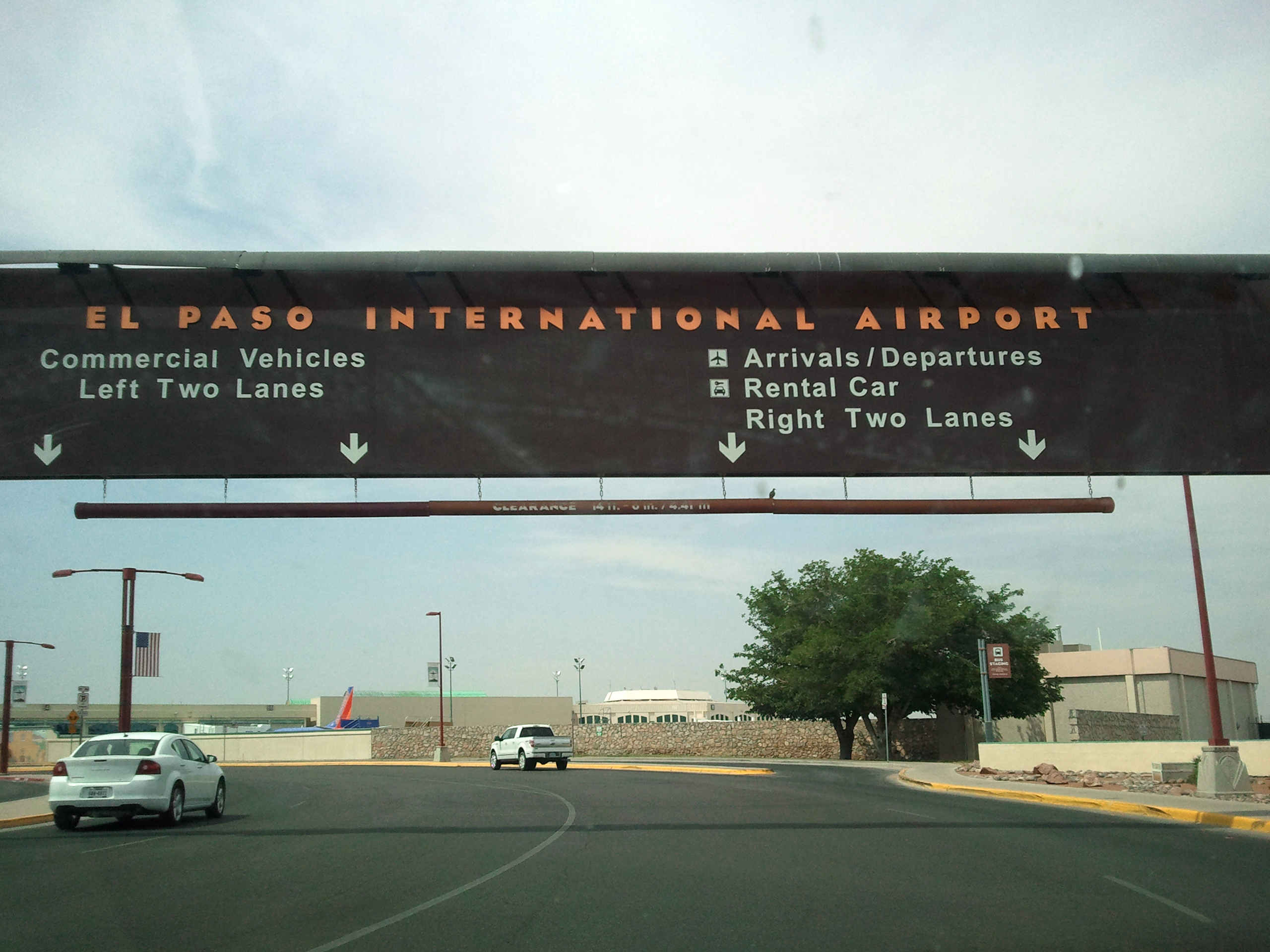
Entering airport terminal

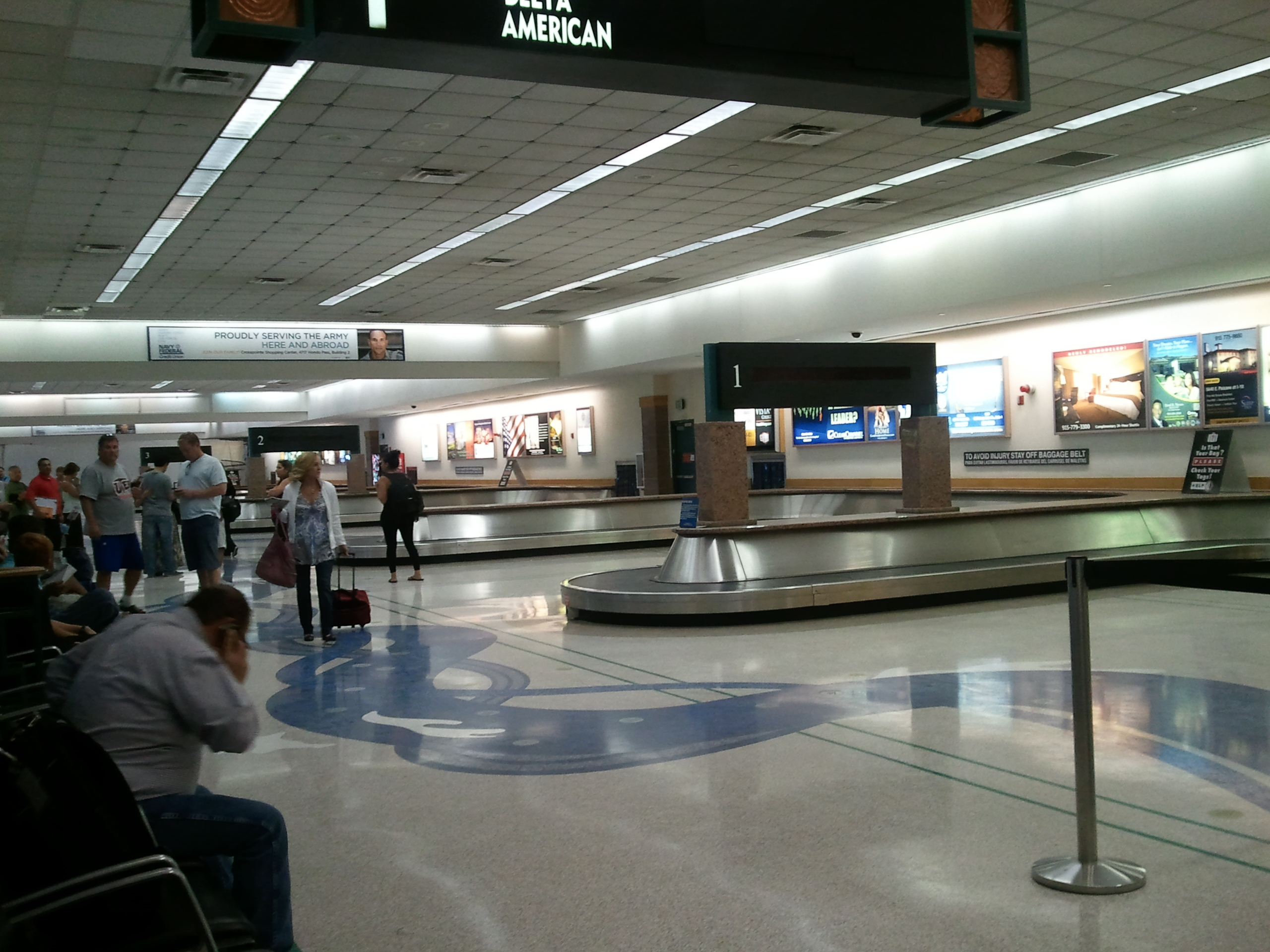
Baggage claim area

The terminal is a pier-satellite layout. It has a central entrance and the gates branch out east to west on the two concourses. The airport has East and West Concourses. Gates A1–A4 are located on the West Concourse and Gates B1–B11 is located on the East Concourse. The airport has a total of 15 gates. There is also a lower and upper level. The gates are located on the upper level and the ticketing, baggage claim, rental car, and main entrance are located on the lower level of the terminal. The meeter/greeter area is located on the lower level just behind the escalators that lead to the Transportation Security Administration (TSA) checkpoint leading to the gates. The corridor from the ticketing/baggage claim to the gate concourses passes through the old terminal which is used today for airport administration. Major terminal renovations have been made over the past several years, designed and managed by the local architectural firm MNK Architects.

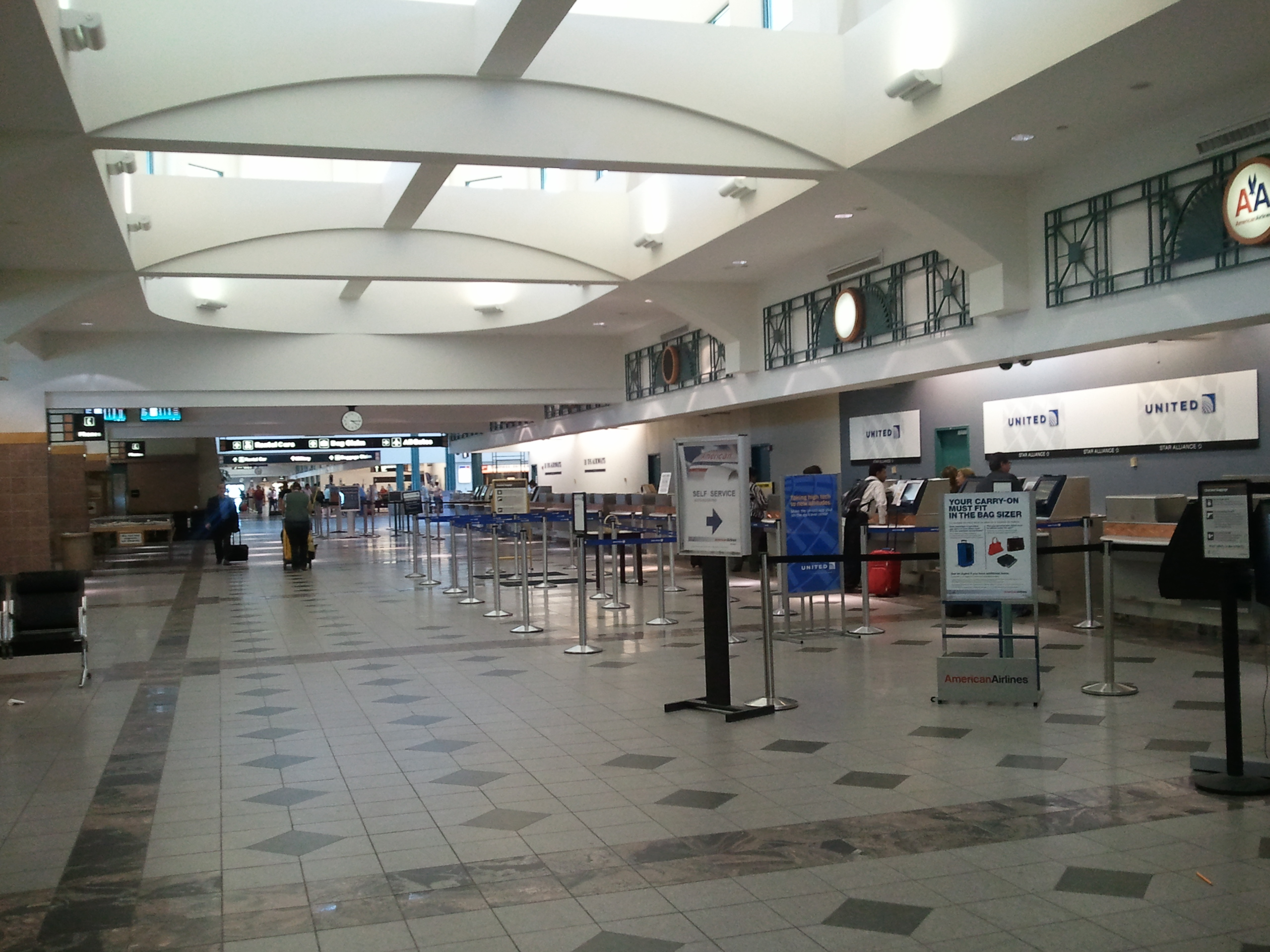
Airlines customer service section

The airport access road is Convair Road. Convair Road splits into four lanes with the left two lanes reserved for commercial vehicles and the right two lanes utilized for pickup and drop-off of passengers. In between the split road there is a waiting area where passengers can wait for commercial vehicles to arrive.

Gates: Generally, these gates are used by: Gates A1–A4: American Airlines and American Eagle. Gate B1: Delta Air Lines. Gates B3, B5-B7: Southwest Airlines Gate B10 Allegiant. Gates B8 and B9: United Airlines and United Express. Gate B10: Alaska. Gate B11: Frontier.

Food court: The food court is between gates B6 and B11; it has Carlos and Mickey's Mexican Express, Slice, Tia's, Schlotzsky's, Cinnabon and Starbucks.

=== Other facilities ===
The El Paso Independent School District (EPISD) began leasing a property on the grounds of the airport in 1963 to house its administrative headquarters. By the 2010s the City of El Paso desired the use of the property for airport expansion, but chose to defer the original 2014 expiration of the lease to at least December 31, 2019, so EPISD had time to find a new headquarters location. In 2021 the current EPISD headquarters in Downtown El Paso opened.

== Airlines and destinations ==
El Paso International Airport has 15 gates on 2 concourses: Concourse A (used exclusively by American) has gates A1–A4 and Concourse B has gates B1–B11.

=== Passenger ===
Airlines	Destinations
Alaska Airlines	Seattle/Tacoma
American Airlines	Dallas/Fort Worth; Seasonal: Phoenix–Sky Harbor
American Eagle	Chicago–O'Hare, Dallas/Fort Worth, Los Angeles, Phoenix–Sky Harbor
Delta Air Lines	Atlanta
Frontier Airlines	Denver, Las Vegas
Southwest Airlines	Austin, Dallas–Love, Denver, Houston–Hobby, Las Vegas, Los Angeles, Phoenix–Sky Harbor, San Antonio, San Diego; Seasonal: Chicago–Midway, Nashville, Orlando
United Airlines	Denver
United Express	Chicago–O'Hare, Houston–Intercontinental

Destinations map
Destinations from El Paso International Airport
Red = Year-round destination
Green = Seasonal destination
Blue = Future Destination

== Statistics ==
=== Annual traffic ===
ELP Airport annual passenger traffic and operations 2014–present
Year	Passengers	Freight (tons)	Operations
2014	2,778,248	86,470	91,567
2015	2,763,213	90,573	83,115
2016	2,807,734	85,085	79,148
2017	2,929,362	87,131	74,899
2018	3,260,556	96,655	86,016
2019	3,517,053	92,360	87,095
2020	1,491,148	95,203	76,333
2021	2,821,175	103,972	88,838
2022	3,667,439	98,376	93,379
2023	3,904,110	101,420	96,316
2024	4,038,530	93,830	97,737
2025	3,838,968	83,183	94,499

=== Top destinations ===
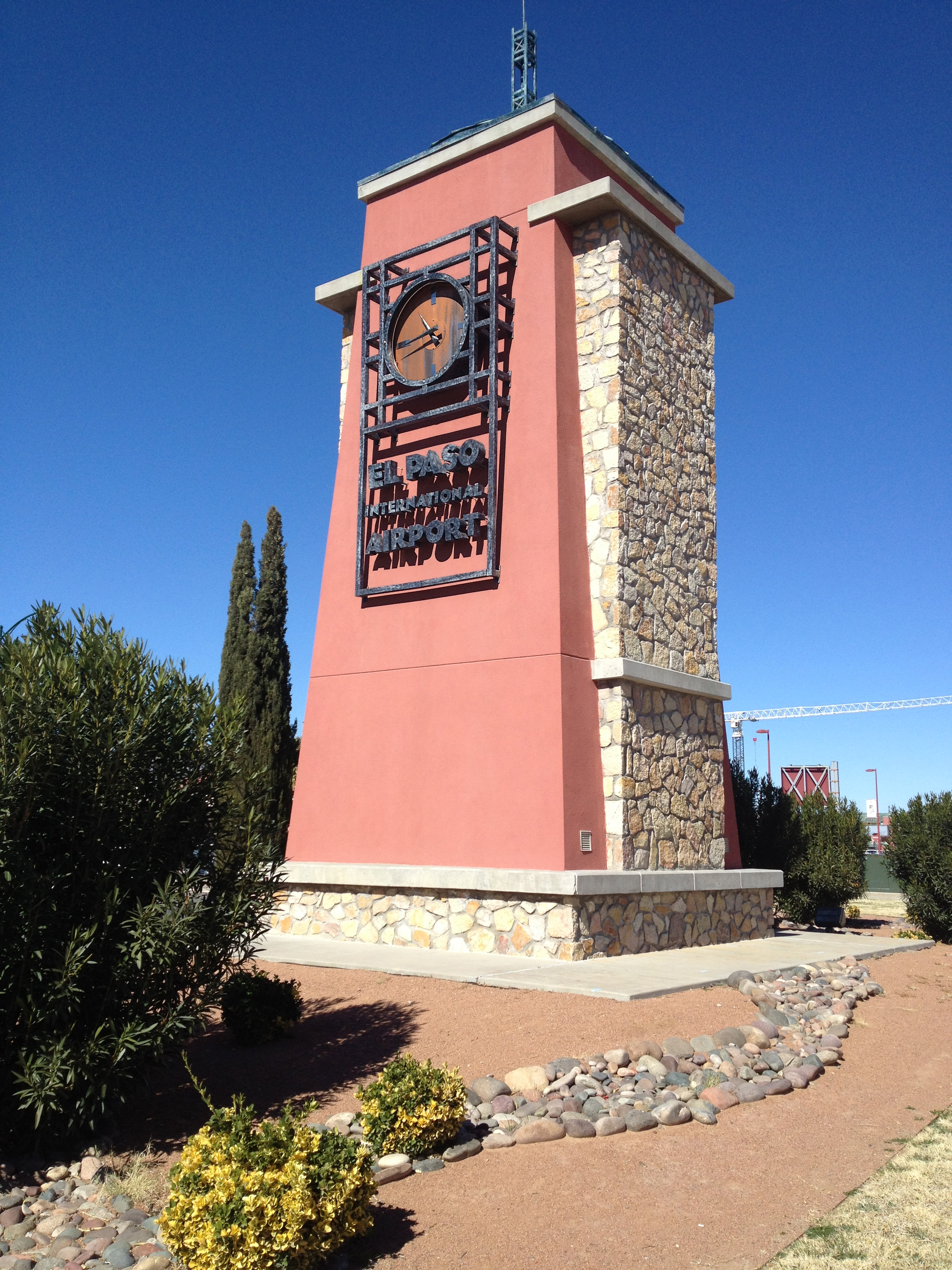
Airport clock tower

Busiest domestic routes from ELP (April 2025 – March 2026)
Rank	City	Passengers	Carriers
1	Dallas/Fort Worth, Texas	296,260	American
2	Denver, Colorado	220,140	Frontier, Southwest, United
3	Phoenix–Sky Harbor, Arizona	215,190	American, Southwest
4	Dallas–Love, Texas	198,970	Southwest
5	Las Vegas, Nevada	157,150	Allegiant, Southwest
6	Houston–Hobby, Texas	123,110	Southwest
7	Houston–Intercontinental, Texas	119,090	United
8	Austin, Texas	107,870	Southwest
9	Atlanta, Georgia	101,470	Delta
10	Los Angeles, California	90,230	American, Southwest

Largest airlines at ELP (April 2025 – March 2026)
Rank	Airline	Passengers	Share
1	Southwest Airlines	1,972,000	52.79%
2	American Airlines	532,000	14/24%
3	Skywest Airlines	245,000	6.56%
4	Mesa Airlines	210,000	5.61%
5	Delta Air Lines	202,000	5.40%
	Other	575,000	15.39%

== Ground transportation ==
Sun Metro routes 33 and 208 pick up outside the terminal. A connection at the Eastside Terminal to the 50 or 59 bus is required to get to Amtrak and the El Paso Streetcar.

== Accidents and incidents ==
- On August 31, 1957, a USAF Douglas C-124 Globemaster II struck the ground while on approach in poor weather 2.5 miles NE of ELP. Five out of the 15 occupants on board died.
- On July 20, 1982, Douglas C-47D N102BL of Pronto Aviation Services was damaged beyond repair in a crash landing near El Paso International Airport following an engine failure shortly after take-off. The aircraft was on a domestic non-scheduled passenger flight to Tucson International Airport in Arizona when the engine failed and the decision was made to return to El Paso. A single-engine go-around was attempted following an unsafe landing gear warning.

== See also ==
- Texas World War II Army Airfields
