= Pioneer Women's Association =

Woman's club in El Paso, Texas, U.S.

The Association of Pioneer Women was a woman's club in El Paso, Texas. The club was made up of women who had lived in the early days of the founding of El Paso or who were interested in the topic of settler life in the region. Members of the group worked to preserve Southwest history. The group was active from 1921 and into the 1990s.

== History ==
The organization formed on October 7, 1921. Six women founded the group, which held its first meeting in the Pioneer room of the old county courthouse in El Paso. Some of the members had previously been part of the mostly men's organization, the Pioneer Association of El Paso County. The first meeting was held on January 26, 1922 where officers were elected, committees formed and a constitution and by-laws for the organization were adopted. The "main attraction" of the meetings were the oral histories given by women who had lived as pioneers in El Paso. The clubwomen decided that they would meet in each others' homes and the second Thursday of every month. Later meetings took place in churches or other public spaces. By the 1980s, it was required that members must have lived in the greater El Paso region for at least 30 years.

The first president of the organization was Mrs. I.A. Shedd. The Pioneers worked to get the Magoffin Homestead preserved as a museum. The organization also preserved ephemera and manuscripts relating to early life in El Paso.

== Notable members ==
- Kate Moore Brown.
