= Robert N. Mullin =

Writer of Western history (1893–1982)

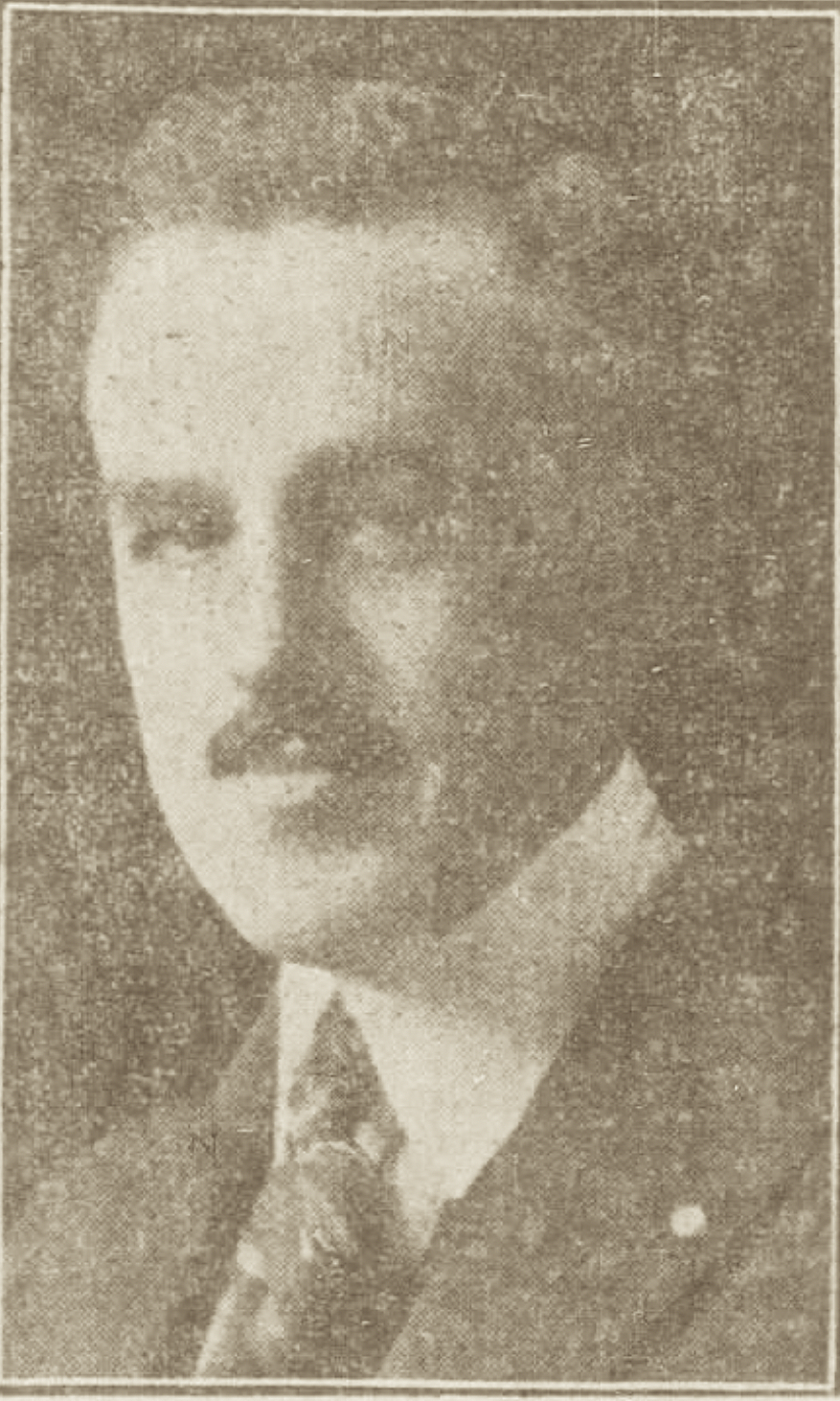
- Mullin c. 1927
- Born: Robert Norville Mullin; August 10, 1893; Lincoln, Nebraska, US
- Died: June 27, 1982 (aged 88); South Laguna, California, US
- Occupations: Historian; Author; Researcher
- Years active: 1950–1982

Robert Norville Mullin (August 10, 1893 – June 27, 1982) was an American businessman and public figure in El Paso, Texas, where he founded the Calmut Oil Company (COC) in 1917. In 1928, while serving city alderman, he was responsible for the founding of the El Paso Airport. Shortly afterwards, he sold the COC to a larger oil company and spent the next two decades working in the oil industry around the country, largely as an executive at Gulf Oil.

Born in Lincoln, Nebraska, Mullin moved to El Paso in 1900 at the age of seven. There his family befriended several public figures of the Southwestern United States and Mexico, among them the future revolutionary Pancho Villa and lawman Pat Garrett. From Garrett he heard accounts of Billy the Kid whom Garret killed, and thus began a lifelong fascination with Billy that led Mullin to become one the leading scholars on the subject. His research on the subject included identifying Billy's real birth name, Henry McCarty. He authored several journal articles on Billy, wrote a book on Billy's childhood, and authored a book on the Lincoln County War in which Billy was involved. Mullin also contributed to research on relations between the United States and Mexico following the Mexican-American War, and penned works on other topics related to the American West of the 19th century.

He retired to South Laguna, California, and was active as a writer and historian his later life.

== Early life ==
The son of Joseph P. Mullin and Charlotte Norville, Robert Norville Mullin was born on August 10, 1893, in Lincoln, Nebraska. His father was born in Iowa to a first generation Irish-American father and a mother who originally hailed from Ireland. Robert's mother was the daughter of Captain William N. Norville who served in the Union Army during the American Civil War. Captain Norville is briefly written about in Willis Fletcher Johnson's book Life of Sitting Bull. Robert's father was an educator who taught at an institution that ultimately was folded into University of Nebraska.

Robert moved with his family to El Paso, Texas, just in time to celebrate Christmas there in December 1900. There his father worked as the assistant principal of the El Paso Normal School before founding the International Business College in that city. The school offered secretarial and book keeping training in classes taught in both English and Spanish; catering to students along the border between Texas and Mexico. In 1906 his brother Francis Joseph Mullin (known as Joe) was born. He grew up to become president of Shimer College in Chicago. His mother died when Joe was two years old; never completely recovering from a difficult child birth.

Robert graduated from El Paso High School (EPHS) in 1912. While in high school he wrote a children's play which was staged at the home of Mrs. H. D. Slater. Slater went on to establish the Children's Little Theater company in El Paso which presented plays for decades in that city. Slater credited Mullin's play as the seed for that organization. In his growing up years, Robert's father befriended several luminary figures of the American West; among them lawman Pat Garrett, who killed Billy the Kid, and revolutionary leader Pancho Villa; the latter of whom admired F. J. Mullin's bilingual school for including Mexican students. Robert spent time with both men during his childhood.

== Early career in El Paso ==
Following graduation from high school, Mullin purchased Morgan's second hand book store in El Paso. In its place he established the El Paso Book Company on Mill Street; a business venture he went into with former EPHS principal John W. Curd. Following Curd's unexpected death in 1913, he continued in this venture with Curd's widow, Anna Virginia Curd in 1914. After being diagnosed with tuberculosis he sold this business to Jasper Woolbridge, and not long after this began working in the oil industry for the Great Western Oil Company.

In January 1915 Mullin was made a knight in the El Paso chapter of the Knights of Pythias. He married Josephine Plumridge in 1916. In 1917 he founded the Calmut Oil Company (COC) in El Paso, and continued to work for petroleum companies throughout his career. By 1923 he had grown his business to include 12 service stations in El Paso which sold gasoline and oil manufactured by his company.

During the 1910s, Mullin volunteered for the Boy Scouts of America (BSA) as a scoutmaster for Troop No. 2 in El Paso before becoming the first scoutmaster for the newly created Troop No. 3 in 1919. He was elected president of a scoutmasters association in that region of Texas in 1919, and oversaw the establishment of a school to train scoutmasters. He later was appointed to the role of deputy scout commissioner and was involved in partnership events between the BSA and the American Red Cross. He served as a chairman for the Young Men's Business League in 1920, and was also in leadership roles with the YMCA and the City Boys Work Council in El Paso during the 1920s.

Mullin's father died in 1921 while Mullin was in Mexico City on business for the COC leaving his elementary school aged younger brother Francis an orphan. Robert filed a formal petition for guardianship of his brother in March 1921, and in July 1921 he sold his father's business college to Joseph Gilkey. His brother spent time living with him, and with other relatives; ultimately settling in the home of their aunt Josephine who was their mother's sister.

By 1921 Mullin was serving as president of the El Paso Speedway & Amusement Co in addition to continuing as president of the COC and working as president of the business college his father founded. From 1921–1923 he was director of El Passo's Chamber of Commerce. In 1922 he was appointed president of the El Paso Salesmanship Club, and was elected president of the Kiwanis chapter in El Paso. In 1923 he chaired the committee that established El Paso's first golf course. In 1927 he was included as an alderman on candidate R. Ewing Thomason's ticket in his candidacy for Mayor of El Paso. He served as alderman on the El Paso City Council during Thomason's term in that office. During the time he was placed in charge of establishing the El Paso Airport in 1928.

== Oil executive ==
Mullin operated a 900-acre cattle ranch in New Mexico for a brief period before leaving Southwest United States. He sold the Calmut Oil Company to a larger oil company based in Chicago, and ended up relocating first to Denver before ultimately settling in Chicago. The sale of his oil company occurred approximately a year after his term as alderman in El Paso ended. In 1932 he co-founded the India-Penn Oil Company in Indianapolis, and was involved in a variety of oil firms based out of Chicago.

In 1934 he joined the Gulf Oil company as assistant division manager of their office in Toledo, Ohio. He ultimately worked as manager of retail sales for that company out of the Toledo office. He was promoted to zone manager over the Chicago division in 1954. He retired from Gulf Oil in 1958, but soon after took a job with Somner Sollit Company in Chicago as director of their petroleum industry division. He served as Illinois state chairman for the Oil Industry Information Committee of the American Petroleum Institute (API) in the mid-1950s. He was honored with an outstanding service award by the API in 1957.

== Historian and author ==
Mullin was a charter member of the El Paso County Historical Society, and penned several history books and papers. He was a recognized authority on Billy the Kid who uncovered several falsehoods in the stories told by lawman Pat Garrett, and located details on Billy the Kid's childhood that were previously unknown. One of his important discoveries was properly identifying Billy's birth name as Henry McCarty and not William H. Bonney as previously believed.

Mullin's interest in Billy the Kid history of the American West stemmed from his relationship with Garrett as a child, and his confusion over conflicting accounts that he read in comics, newspapers, and other publications in his growing up years. As a hobby, he began trying to track down the truth about Billy the Kid and his life in the mid-1910s, and continued to pursue avenues of research on him throughout the remainder of his life. He spent most of his vacations while working in the oil industry doing research on Billy in travels to Arizona and New Mexico. He also interviewed many people who knew Billy during the 1870s and 1880s.

One of the areas in which Mullin's research excelled was in properly identifying the physical locations of where specific events occurred, and reconstructing where buildings and streets long gone had once stood in places like Lincoln, New Mexico, and Tombstone, Arizona. His research in historical cartography was used for the placement of several historical markers. He created maps and illustrations of buildings which were published in Frazier Hunt's book The Tragic Days of Billy the Kid (1956). He was a guest on the episode "Tombstone– Fact or Fiction" which aired in 1964 on the public television program Arizona Western Roundtable which was hosted by John D. Gilchreise of the University of Arizona.

Mullin also did research on Mexican-American relations following the Treaty of Guadalupe Hidalgo which ended the Mexican–American War; authoring papers which explored territorial disputes in the time period leading up to the Gadsden Purchase. His book on the Lincoln County War was published by the Press of the Territorian in 1966.

== Death ==
Mullin retired to South Laguna, California, where he was living by 1962. He died there on June 27, 1982, at the age of 88. His daughter Francis was married to El Paso surgeon Edward H. Daseler. His other daughter, Marjorie, was married to University of Michigan professor Ralph Jackson.

== Publications ==
- Tombstone A.T. : business section, May 1882, by Robert N. Mullin, 1950
- New Light on the Legend of Billy the Kid, New Mexico Folklore Record, 6 (1953), 1–5. Philip J. Rasch and Robert N. Mullin.
- Dim Trails: The Pursuit of the McCarty Family, New Mexico Folklore Record, 8 (1954), 6–11. Philip J. Rasch and Robert N. Mullin.
- A Chronology of the Lincoln County War : scene: Mostly Lincoln County, New Mexico, time: mainly 1877-1881, by Robert N. Mullin, 1966
- The Boyhood of Billy the Kid, by Robert N. Mullin, 1967
- The Key to the Mystery of Pat Garrett, by Robert N. Mullin, 1969
- The Strange Story of Wayne Brazel, by Robert N. Mullin, 1970
- An Item from old Mesilla, by Robert N. Mullin, 1971
- Tombstone, Arizona Territory, circa 1881-82, by Robert N. Mullin, 1971
- Stagecoach Pioneers of the Southwest, by Robert N. Mullin, 1983
