= Maud Durlin Sullivan =

American librarian (1870–1943)

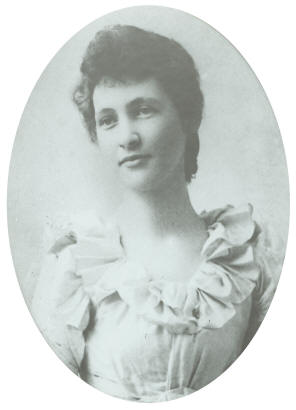
- Born: December 7, 1870; Ripon, Wisconsin, US
- Died: December 28, 1943; El Paso, Texas, US
- Occupation: Librarian

Maud Durlin Sullivan (December 7, 1870 – December 28, 1943) was an American librarian. She is most well known for her work as the librarian of the El Paso Public Library.

== Biography ==
=== Early life and education ===
Sullivan was born in 1870 in Ripon, Wisconsin, although some sources state she was born in 1872. Her parents were Fayette Durlin, a reverend, and Anna L. Root. The family moved to Madison, Wisconsin when Sullivan was a little girl. She was educated at Kemper Hall, a local Episcopal school, with her siblings and other neighborhood kids. In 1895, she moved to Brooklyn, New York to study art and music at the New York School of Applied Design for Women (later known as the Pratt-New York Phoenix School of Design). After finishing her studies in 1896, she moved back to Madison and opened an art studio. In 1904, she became a library assistant at the Eau Claire Public Library, located in Madison, and in 1905 worked as a library assistant at the Oshkosh Public Library in Oshkosh, Wisconsin. Sullivan then decided to pursue a career as a librarian and returned to New York in 1905 to study library science at the Pratt Library School (now called the Pratt School of Information).

== Career ==
=== El Paso Public Library ===
After graduating in 1908 from library school, she moved to El Paso, Texas in August to be the librarian of the El Paso Public Library after Clara Mulliken resigned. In 1912, she married John Kevin Sullivan, a mining engineer, at St. Clement's Church and moved with him to New Mexico's Mogollan Mountains, located in the Gila Wilderness. The couple returned to El Paso in April 1917 and Sullivan resumed her position at the library. During her time at the library, she worked hard to expand its resources and strengthen its connection to the El Paso Community.

The arts were important to Sullivan, and she made the library an artistic and cultural center by increasing the materials about art and supporting local artists. She increased the number of books on subjects like art, art history, archaeology, and history. In addition, she would display the works of local artists at the library and had art exhibits from galleries in New York come to the library. Sullivan also became friends with various artists, including Peter Hurd, Jean Carl Hertzog Sr., Tom Lea III, Jose Cisneros, and Fremont Ellis.

Because of El Paso's high Spanish-speaking population, Sullivan expanded the library's Spanish-language collection. She even taught herself Spanish so that she would be better able to pick the best Spanish-language books to add to the library's collection. During her career, the library acquired more than 2,000 volumes in Spanish.

In addition to expanding the library's cultural and Spanish collections, she created the library's mining reference section, which has been used by engineers throughout the Southwest. She also increased the library's collection of musical scores as well as public documents published by the US government. Since history was very important to Sullivan (especially Southwest history), she worked hard to expand the library's Southwest collection, which includes materials about Texas, New Mexico, Arizona, and northern Mexico. The efforts to expand the Southwest collection began in 1920 and is being expanded to this day. Writer J. Frank Dobie was impressed with Sullivan's work and donated his notes and manuscript of Apache Gold and Yaqui Silver to the El Paso Public Library. During her time at the El Paso Public Library, the library acquired 3,481 volumes on southwest history. In 1919, the library had 17,453 books; in 1929, that number increased to 36,842 volumes; by 1940, there were 112,290 books and pamphlets.

In 1935, the El Paso Public Library became one of only two libraries in Texas, and one out thirty libraries in the US to receive the Carnegie Art Reference Set, a collection of 1,400 prints and 127 books on art.

=== Other library work ===
Sullivan was heavily involved with regional, national, and international library organizations. She was the president of the Texas Library Association from 1923 to 1925. During that time, she started the organization's official bulletin News Notes, with its first issue published in November 1924. She served as the editor until 1927.

Sullivan was part of an effort by the Texas Library Association (TLA) to ensure that those serving in Texas during World War I had access to reading material. They held book collecting drives and fundraisers to increase reading supplies and to help with the war effort. In addition, the El Paso Public Library was a base for troops stationed at the Mexican border.

Sullivan, along with other Texas librarians, expressed a desire to increase the public services libraries could offer. At the 1922 TLA Convention held in Austin, Texas, they met with librarians from bordering states to discuss their goals and soon formed the Southwestern Library Association. While establishing the association was a group effort, Sullivan and fellow librarian Dorothy Amann (TLA president from 1921 to 1922) are credited for conducting most of the organizational work.

Sullivan's passion for libraries went beyond the state and national levels. In 1927, she spent two months in Mexico City to study their libraries. The following year, she guided six Mexican librarians around libraries in the United States. She wrote about these experiences in her article "A Library Pilgrimage" published in a 1928 issue of the Bulletin of the American Library Association. That same year, she attended the West Baden Conference, which was sponsored by the Carnegie Foundation for International Peace. Sullivan also traveled to Puerto Rico in 1932 to study the island's libraries. In 1935, as part of the international relations committee of the Carnegie Foundation, Sullivan represented the United States at the International Congress of Librarians and Bibliographers held in Spain. She was one of four US citizens to attend the conference.

== Publications and other endeavors ==
Sullivan wrote a variety of articles, lectures, and speeches throughout her career. She wrote for the El Paso Times and the El Paso Herald-Post mostly about subjects pertaining to libraries and her experiences while in Puerto Rico and Spain. Among her other publications are Old Roads and New Highways in the Southwest, which describes the history and expansion of the Southwest. She read the essay at the American Library Association at Los Angeles, California in June 1930.

Outside of the library, Sullivan was interested in art and archaeology. She served as the treasurer and secretary of the El Paso Archaeological Society from 1922 to 1938 and was also involved with the American Institute of Mining and Metallurgical Engineers. In addition, she lectured on art at the Art Study Club of the Woman's Club of El Paso.

== Personal life ==
Sullivan was good friends with Betty Mary Goetting, a librarian and women's rights activist, and was the godmother to her son, Kurt Goetting. Kurt described Sullivan as "a tall woman who was quiet and direct when you talked with her".

== Death ==
Sullivan died on December 28, 1943, due to complications from an ankle injury. Artists Tom Lea III and Jean Carl Hertzog Sr., who were close friends of Sullivan, were pallbearers at her funeral. In 1962, the El Paso Historical Society posthumously inducted Sullivan into their Hall of Honor, in recognition of her career and contributions to El Paso.
