= Magoffin Homestead =

Historic house in Texas, United States

- U.S. National Register of Historic Places
- U.S. Historic district – Contributing property
- Texas State Historic Site
- Texas State Antiquities Landmark
- Recorded Texas Historic Landmark
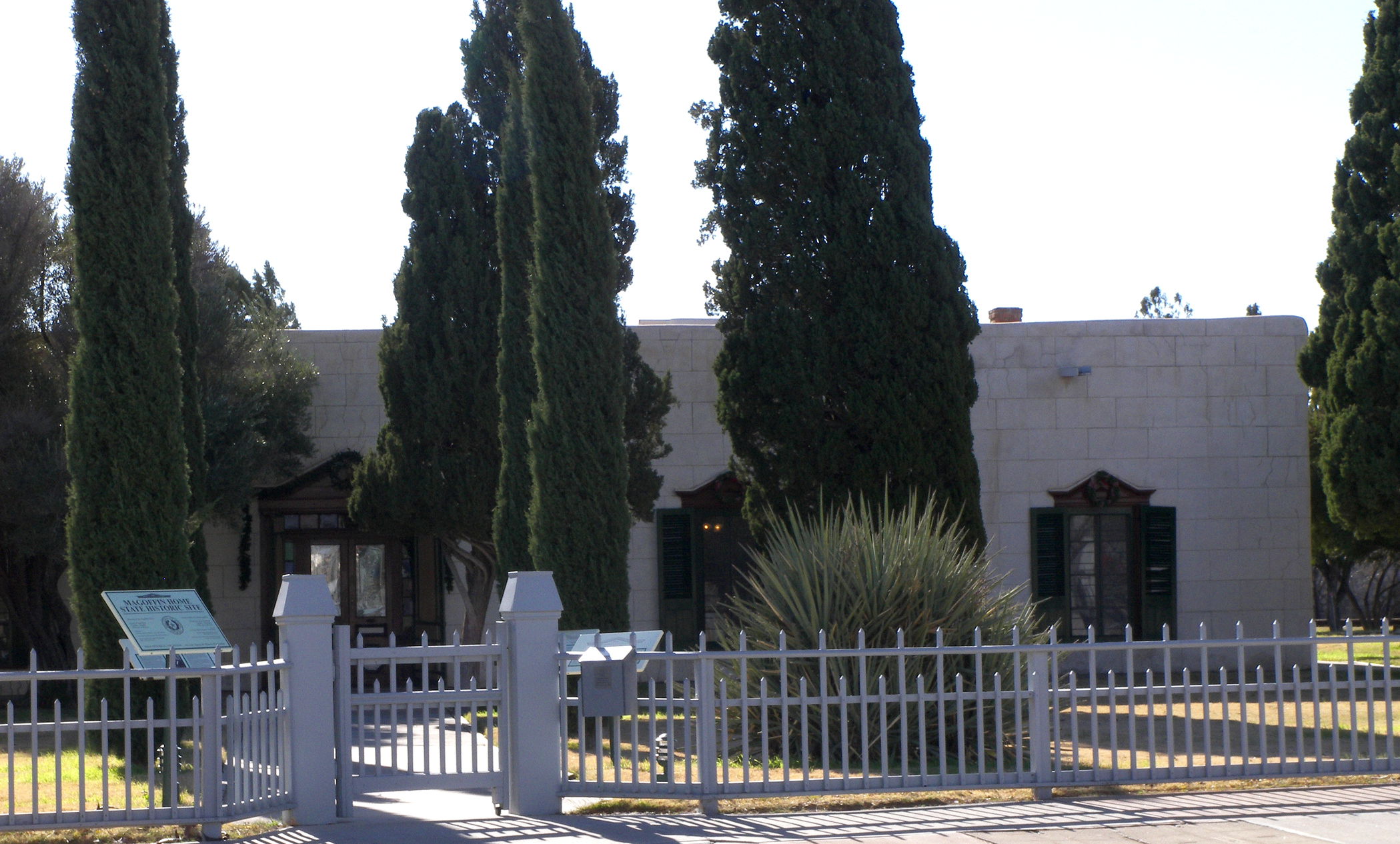
- Magoffin Home State Historic Site

- Location within Texas Location within the United States
- Interactive map showing the location of Magoffin Homestead
- Location: 1120 Magoffin Ave; El Paso, Texas
- Coordinates: 31°45′45″N 106°28′37″W
- Area: 1.5 acres (0.61 ha)
- Built: 1875
- Architectural style: Victorian
- Part of: Magoffin Historic District (ID16000717)
- NRHP reference No.: 71000931
- TSAL No.: 8200000240
- RTHL No.: 3183

Significant dates
- Added to NRHP: March 31, 1971
- Designated CP: October 11, 2016
- Designated TSHS: 1976
- Designated TSAL: February 22, 1983
- Designated RTHL: 1962

Magoffin Home is located in El Paso, Texas. It was placed on the National Register of Historic Places in 1971. The surrounding area was declared the Magoffin Historic District on February 19, 1985. The home is now known as the Magoffin Home State Historic Site under the authority of the Texas Historical Commission.

The Magoffin Home, built in 1875, is a combination of the local adobe style combined with Greek revival details and is an example of the Territorial style. The thick adobe walls keep the house cool in the summer heat and warm in the winter. The house consists of three wings, each built at a different time, the last being built in the 1880s as the center that connected the two previous wings. There are 19 rooms, 8 fireplaces, and 14-foot (4.3 m) ceilings. Members of the family lived in it for 109 years, and many of the original furnishings are still displayed, including a 11.5-foot-tall (3.5 m) half-tester bed.

Built by pioneer Joseph Magoffin, who lived there with his wife, Octavia (MacGreal) until their deaths. They had two children, James (Jim) and Josephine. James married Anne Buford and had four children, Anne, James, Mary and Jim. After James died in 1913 from appendicitis, Anne continued to care for her father-in-law at the homestead until his death in September, 1923. Josephine married William J. Glasgow, a future Brigadier General in an extravaganza newspapers hailed as the 'wedding of the century'. After the death of Joseph, Josephine inherited the house and James' family settled in Los Angeles where Anne lived until her death in 1962. The last member of the family to live in the home was Octavia Magoffin Glasgow, Josephine's daughter, who died in 1986.

After retiring from the military, the Glasgows returned to El Paso, Texas and remodeled the interior of the home, installing gas heat and electrical service, updating plumbing, and modernizing the kitchen. The remodeling included plastering directly over her mother's Victorian wallpapers and removing the canvas ceilings (mantas). In 1976, the home was sold to the City and State, although Joseph's granddaughter, Octavia Magoffin Glasgow, retained lifetime tenancy and continued to live in the home until her death in 1986. In 1977–1978, the house was restored by historic preservationist Eugene George, a professor of the School of Architecture at the University of Texas at Austin.

The homestead is located at 1120 Magoffin Ave. in El Paso, Texas and is currently jointly owned by the City of El Paso and the State of Texas. It has been maintained by the Texas Historical Commission since 2007 when authority of that agency was transferred from the Texas Parks and Wildlife Department which had overseen the historic site since 1976. There is a historical marker. The Casa Magoffin Companeros (Friends of the Magoffin Home) host several annual events at the home, including kids camps and classes in the summer and a Holiday Open House in December.

Tours of the home are available Tuesday through Sunday from 9 a.m. to 5 p.m. The last tour starts at 4 p.m.. Tickets for the tour, as well as unique gifts, may be purchased at the Visitor Center located across the street from the home at 1117 Magoffin Ave.

== See also ==
- National Register of Historic Places listings in El Paso County, Texas
- Recorded Texas Historic Landmarks in El Paso County
- Pioneer Women's Association
