= El Paso High School =

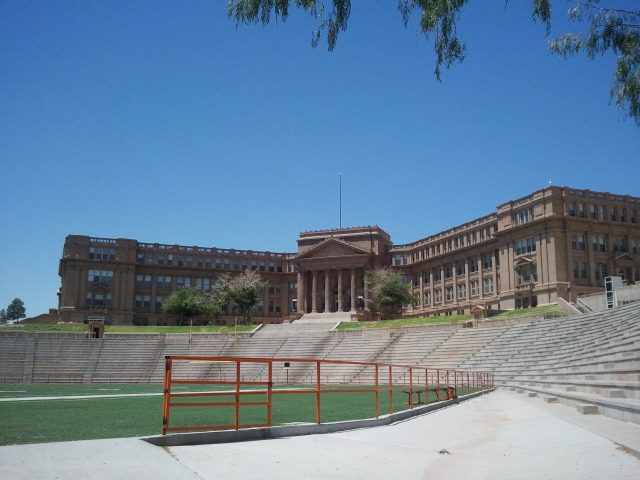
- El Paso High School

Location
- 800 East Schuster Avenue; El Paso, Texas 79902; United States; 31°46′23″N 106°29′28″W

Information
- Type: Public
- Motto: "Pride of El Paso"
- Established: 1916
- Principal: Sandra Rocha
- Teaching staff: 98.08 (FTE)
- Grades: 9-12
- Enrollment: 1,580 (2022-2023)
- Student to teacher ratio: 16.11
- Colors: Orange and Black
- Mascot: Tiger (Tiberius)
- Nickname: "The Lady On The Hill"
- Newspaper: The Tatler
- Yearbook: The Spur
- Website: El Paso High Tigers
- El Paso High School
- U.S. National Register of Historic Places
- Location within Texas Location within the United States
- Location: 1600 N. Virginia St., El Paso, Texas
- Area: 9.5 acres (3.8 ha)
- Built: 1916
- Architect: Trost & Trost
- Architectural style: Classical Revival
- NRHP reference No.: 80004103
- Added to NRHP: November 17, 1980

El Paso High School is the oldest operating high school in El Paso, Texas, and is part of the El Paso Independent School District. It serves the west-central section of the city, roughly south and west of the Franklin Mountains and north of Interstate 10 to the vicinity of Executive Center Boulevard. It is fed by Wiggs Middle School, into which the three elementary schools in its feeder pattern, Lamar, Mesita, and Vilas, graduate.

== History ==
"The Lady on the Hill", as El Paso High is nicknamed, sits on a mountainside at the foot of the Franklin Mountains overlooking the central portion of the city and its boundary with Ciudad Juárez, Mexico. It stands out prominently on the horizon commanding a view of the city. Built by the architectural firm of Trost & Trost, the Greco-Roman features of El Paso High made it a unique landmark in town. Construction for the school cost about $500,000. Inside the front entrance, the hallway that circles the rear of the large auditorium has coffered low ceilings and classical columns. The main corridor floor was of marble; the other hall floors were of quarter-sawed oak; and the classroom floors were made of hard maple. Most of the toilet and shower rooms were finished in tile, marble and porcelain.

The ground floor is below street level. The second floor is at street level, and its two perpendicular wings connect at a 45-degree angle with a heavily decorated Corinthian porch or pavilion. This overlooks Jones Stadium, named after the first Assistant Principal of the school, R. Randolph Jones. The stadium, seating 12,000, was one of the first major concrete stadiums built in the country. Semicircular steps lead up to the main entrance to the school built of concrete and tile. At the top of the steps are six terra cotta pillars supporting a pediment and entablature bearing the school's name.

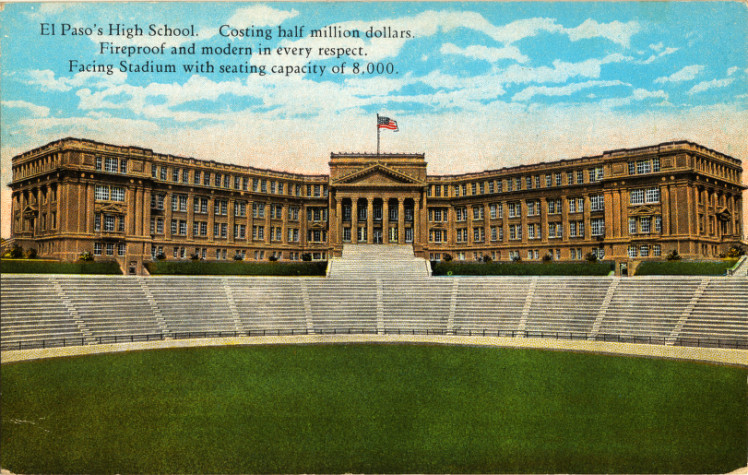
El Paso High School (postcard, circa 1916)

On each side of the steps are brick and terra cotta-trimmed bases, holding cast-iron candelabra. Above the front doors a bronze tablet bears these words: "'A Cultivated Mind is the Genius of Democracy: It is the Only Dictator that Free Men Acknowledge and the Only Security that Free Men Desire' -- Mirabeau B. Lamar."

In 1922, Ku Klux Klan board members elected to change the school's name to honor its Texas hero, Sam Houston (President of the Republic of Texas and Governor of Texas). El Paso High became Sam Houston High School but was changed back after a year because of strong community protest. In February 1923, the Ku Klux Klan was defeated in the local polls and their presence in El Paso soon died out.

In May 1922, students only needed 16 units of credit to graduate, but by September that number had changed to 20. El Paso High offered the first music classes in the state and it was also the first to include a modern language, Spanish, in its course of study.

El Paso High School was also the first in the state to have a student military corps, organized by the district superintendent, Capt. Calvin W. Esterly, a retired Army officer who had graduated from West Point.

On November 17, 1980, El Paso High officially became a historic landmark with the National Register of Historic Places (NRHP).

Several scenes from the 2006 film Glory Road, starring Josh Lucas, Jon Voight, and Emily Deschanel, were filmed on campus.

In 2016 the El Paso Independent School District passed a bond to build a new Fine Arts building on the EPHS campus. Construction begun in 2016 with work set to be completed in Spring of 2022. According to EPISD news on the project, the total budget of the new building is $19,478,383 with its building completion at a 93% as of January 24, 2022.

== Feeder schools ==
- Green Elementary School ,
- Lamar Elementary School ,
- Mesita Elementary School ,
- Moreno Elementary School ,
- Vilas Elementary School , and
- Wiggs Middle School .

== Tiger athletics ==
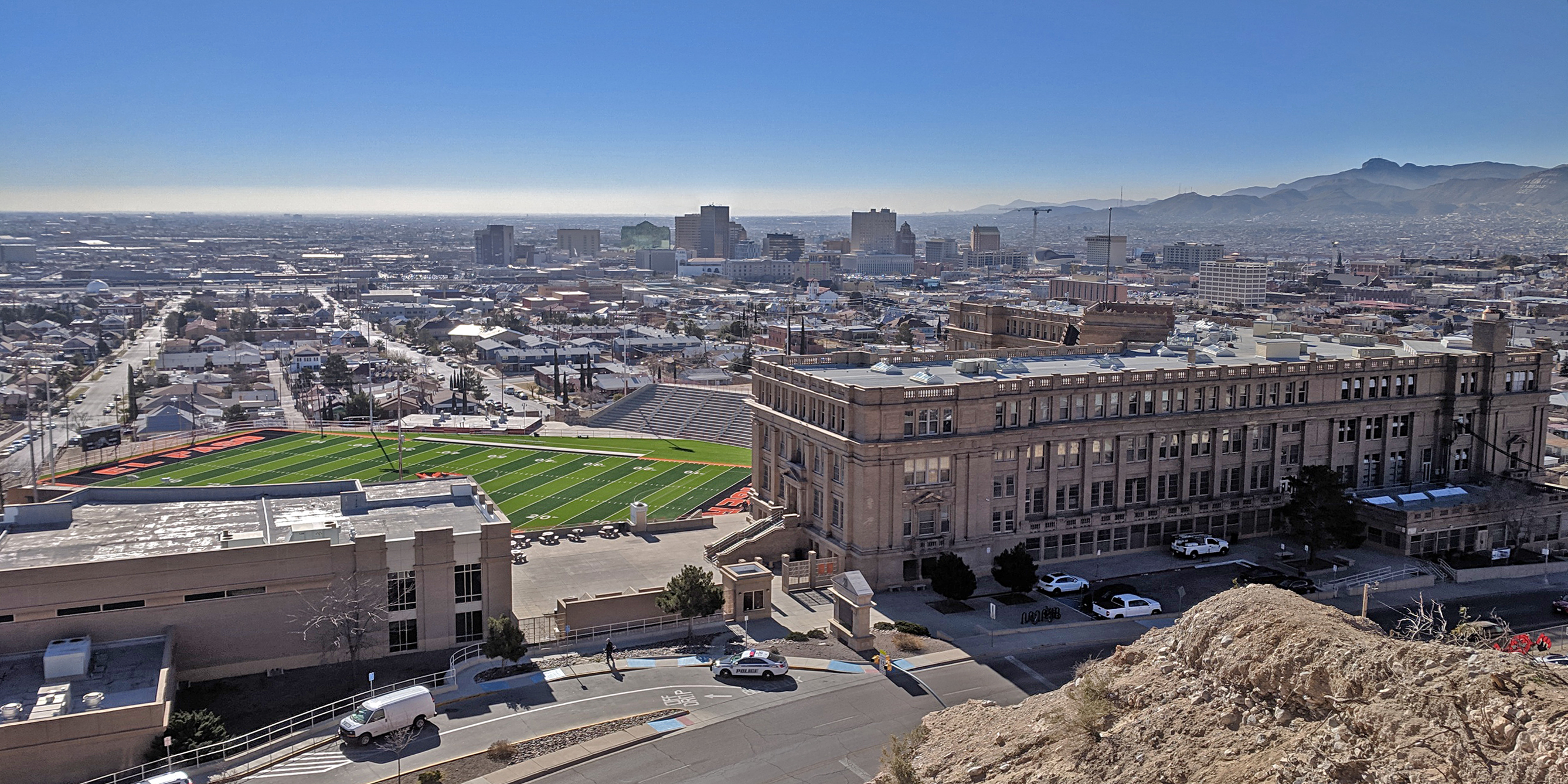
El Paso High School and downtown El Paso, Texas, and Juarez beyond, view from Tom Lea Upper Park

El Paso High is known for its cross country, track and field, tennis, and volleyball programs. The Tiger varsity tennis team made history on October 15, 2009, when they defeated the Burges High School (El Paso, Texas) Mustangs and became the first team in school history to win the UIL District 1-4A Team Tennis Championship in the fall.

El Paso High has a fierce rivalry with the Austin High School Panthers. In 2010 the El Paso High football team had their first winning season in 10 years at 7–3 under new Coach Robert Morales and took back the "Claw" from rival Austin High School (El Paso, Texas) for the first time in also 10 years.

The cross country programs, under the four-decade tutelage of William Daniel McKillip, have won many team district, regional and state championships in Texas (5-A and 4-A), and claimed several honors in national rankings. The school has also churned out dozens of individual district, regional, and state champions in cross country and in track and field, many of whom have gone on to successful and championship careers at the NCAA level and beyond. In 1987/1988 and 2009/2010 the boys soccer team made it to the final four. The girls soccer team (2014–2018) has made the playoffs all four years, winning the last three 1-5A district titles; in 2015–2016 Lady Tigers soccer team made the regional semi-final in Wichita Falls, Texas. Other sports include: wrestling, basketball, baseball, softball, and swimming.

== Notable alumni ==
- F. Murray Abraham – actor; class of 1958
- Cedric Bixler-Zavala – musician and lead singer of the bands At the Drive-In and The Mars Volta
- Kate Moore Brown - musician
- Mel Casas - artist
- Andy Cohen – Major League Baseball second baseman and coach
- Syd Cohen – Major League Baseball pitcher
- Bert Corona - labor and civil rights leader
- Norma Crane – actress
- Louis Daeuble Jr. - architect
- Van Des Autels - actor, radio announcer, and TV news anchor
- Jack Earle – circus giant, actor, salesman, artist
- Betty Mary Goetting - women's rights activist
- William D. Hawkins – US Marine Corps officer, awarded the US's highest military honor – the Medal of Honor
- Ken Heineman - NFL defensive back
- Eric Hilton - hotelier
- Charles S. Kilburn – U.S. Army brigadier general
- Paul Wilbur Klipsch – audio pioneer and engineer
- Tom Lea – painter
- Will Licon – swimmer
- Francisco "Kiko" Martinez – bronze medal winning Olympic basketball player
- Robert N. Mullin - oil executive
- Lupe Ontiveros – actress
- Beto O'Rourke – former U.S. Representative (D)
- Ray Salazar (Class of 1949) – former Mayor of El Paso (1977–79)
- Rubén Salazar – journalist
- Bill Sanders (Class of 1960) – real estate developer
- Dick Savitt (born 1927) – tennis player; World # 2
- Sam Simon – playwright, consumer advocate
- Hilda Stone - screenwriter
- Jack C. Vowell - athlete and UTEP coach
- Jim Ward – musician
- Richard Crawford White – politician

== See also ==
- National Register of Historic Places listings in El Paso County, Texas
- Recorded Texas Historic Landmarks in El Paso County
