= Olga Bernstein Kohlberg =

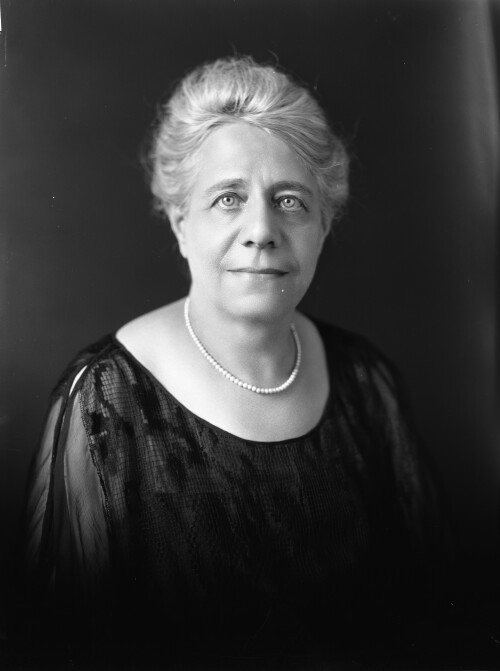
Olga B. Kohlberg

Olga Bernstein Kohlberg (August 2, 1864 – August 12, 1935) was a Jewish Texan philanthropist and founder of the first public kindergarten in Texas. Kohlberg served as president of the Woman's Club of El Paso for two terms, one from 1899-1900 and the other from 1901-1902. Kohlberg lived in the historic Sunset Heights neighborhood.

== Biography ==
Olga Bernstein Kohlberg was born in Elberfeld, Westphalia on August 2, 1864. Kohlberg married Ernst Kohlberg in 1884 and moved with him to El Paso, Texas. She learned both English and Spanish quickly. Kohlberg quickly became involved with the women's club movement in El Paso, Texas.

Kohlberg was involved in the creation of the Child Culture Study Circle in 1891. This group helped create the first kindergarten in Texas which opened in El Paso in 1893. Later, the Child Culture Study Circle changed their name and their focus to the Current Topics Club. In 1894, members of the Current Topics Club helped Mary Irene Stanton with the creation of a small library. In 1895, Kohlberg served on the board of the El Paso Library Foundation. She and other women petitioned the El Paso City Council for land to build a library building. In 1903, she served as president of the El Paso Public Library board of directors and stayed on in that petition until 1935. With her husband, Ernst, the couple helped found the Mount Sinai Congregation in El Paso in 1898.

Kohlberg became involved with the Woman's Club of El Paso (which had grown out of the Current Topics Club) in the 1890s. In 1899, she became president of the group. She was a delegate to the General Federation of Woman's Clubs at their Los Angeles meeting in 1902. She would stay involved with the club until her death.

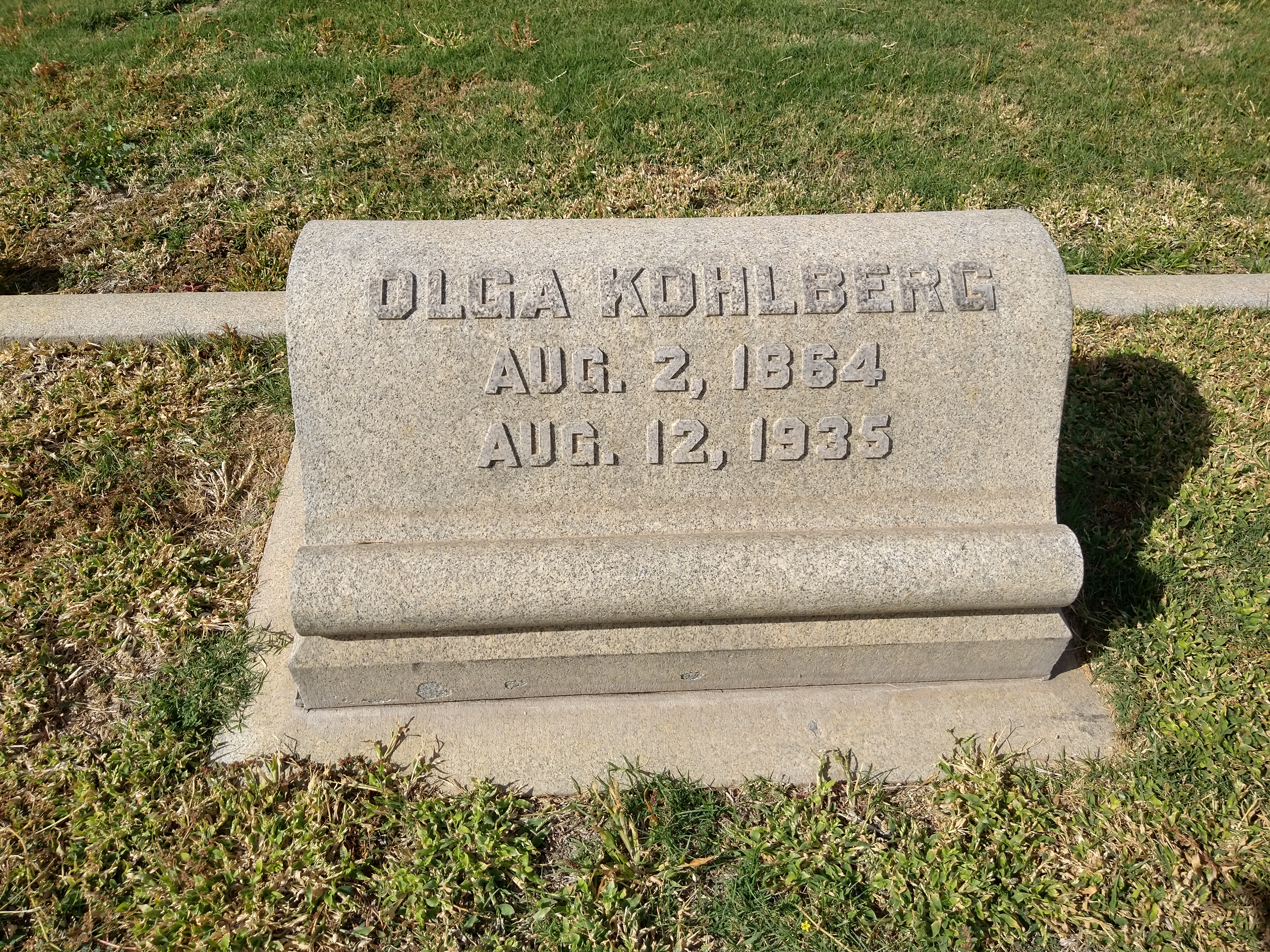
Olga Kohlberg Grave Marker

In 1892 Kohlberg was responsible for the creation of the Ladies' Benevolent Association, a group that opened the first hospital in El Paso. Kohlberg and others were involved in creating a board of directors for the Cloudcroft Baby Sanitorium which was opened in 1911. She was also involved in groups that later became the Family Service of El Paso.

In 1910, Ernst Kohlberg was shot by an angry tenant. Olga Kohlberg died in El Paso after a short illness on August 12, 1935. She was buried in the Mt. Sinai Cemetery in Concordia Cemetery.

== Legacy ==
In 1972, the El Paso County Historical Society named Kohlberg in the Hall of Honor. Two different schools in El Paso are named after Kohlberg. In 1992, the Olga Bernstein Kohlberg prekindergarten/kindergarten was named in May of 1992. In 1997, the Olga B. Kohlberg Elementary School was opened.
