= Kolberg (surname) =

Kolberg is a surname. Notable people with the surname include:

- Elmer Kolberg (1916–1994), American football player
- Fred Kolberg (1900–1965), American welterweight boxer
- Jaan Kolberg (born 1958), Estonian film director and producer
- Kåre Kolberg (1936–2014), Norwegian composer, organist and music critic
- Majtie Kolberg (born 1999), German middle-distance runner
- Martin Kolberg (born 1949), Norwegian politician
- Oskar Kolberg (1814–1890), Polish ethnographer, folklorist, and composer

== See also ==
- Andris Kolbergs (1938–2021), Latvian writer
