= Kohlberg, Styria =

Kohlberg
- Former municipality
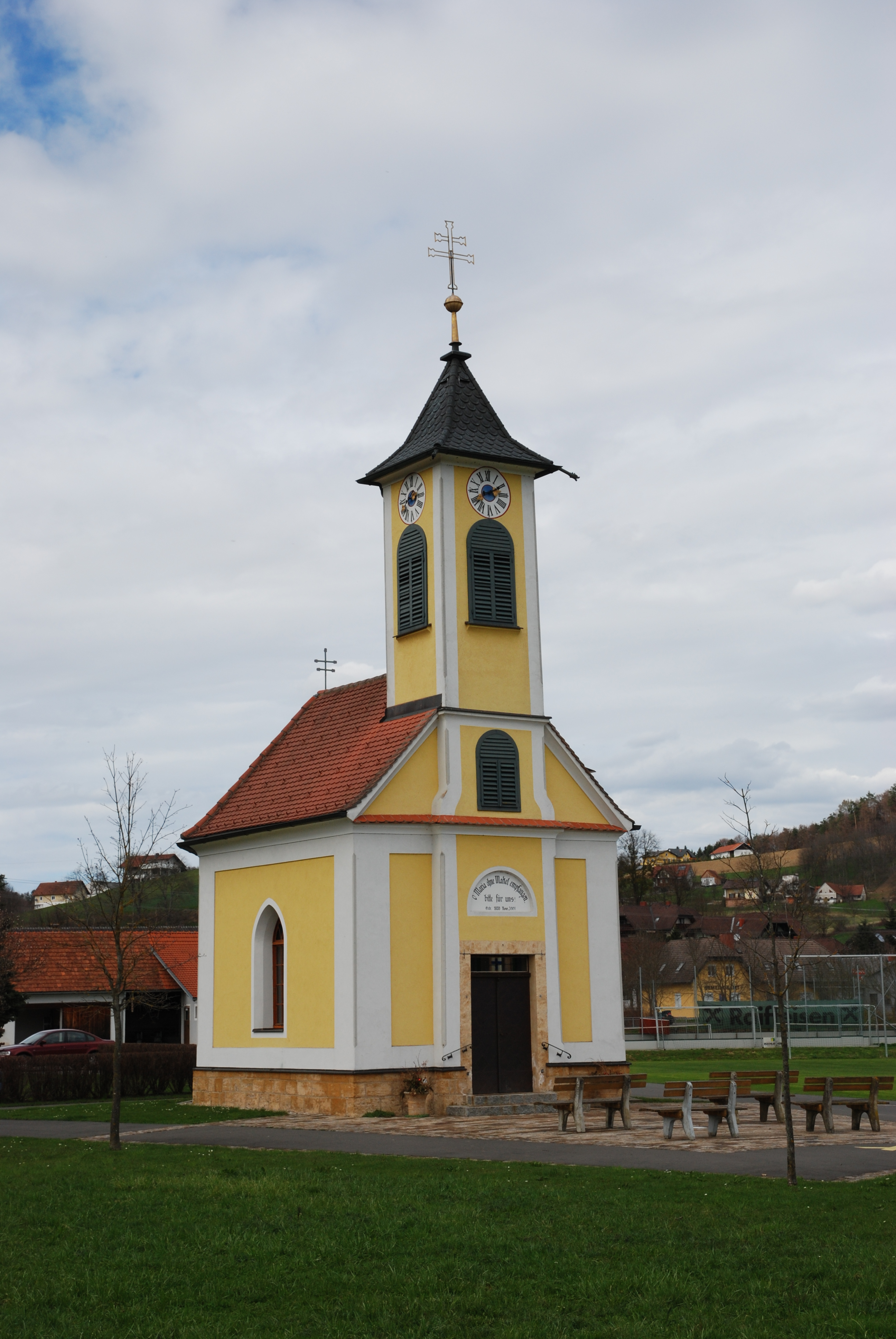
- Chapel in Kohlberg

- Coat of arms

- Location within Austria
- Coordinates: 46°55′00″N 15°48′00″E
- Country: Austria
- State: Styria
- District: Südoststeiermark

Area
  - Total: 7.88 km^{2} (3.04 sq mi)
- Elevation: 296 m (971 ft)

Population (1 January 2016)
  - Total: 524
  - Density: 66.5/km^{2} (172/sq mi)
- Time zone: UTC+1 (CET)
  - Summer (DST): UTC+2 (CEST)
- Postal code: 8341, 8342
- Area code: +43 3151
- Vehicle registration: FB
- Website: www.kohlberg. steiermark.at

Kohlberg (Austrian German pronunciation: [ˈkoːlbɛrɡ]) is a former municipality in the district of Südoststeiermark in the Austrian state of Styria. Since the 2015 Styria municipal structural reform, it is divided between the municipalities Paldau and Gnas.

== Population ==
Historical population
Year	Pop.	±%
1869	715	—
1880	751	+5.0%
1890	712	−5.2%
1900	661	−7.2%
1910	676	+2.3%
1923	684	+1.2%
1934	639	−6.6%
1939	649	+1.6%
1951	566	−12.8%
1961	547	−3.4%
1971	555	+1.5%
1981	579	+4.3%
1991	572	−1.2%
2001	554	−3.1%
2013	508	−8.3%
