= Percy W. McGhee =

American architect

- Born: c. 1890
- Died: February 2, 1971 (aged 80–81); El Paso, Texas, U.S.
- Occupation: Architect
- Notable work: Doña Ana County Courthouse, New Mexico; Thomas Branigan Memorial Library, Las Cruces; El Paso County Coliseum, Texas; United States Court House, El Paso

Percy W. McGhee (c. 1890 - February 2, 1971) was an American architect who designed buildings in New Mexico (like the Doña Ana County Courthouse and the Thomas Branigan Memorial Library in Las Cruces) and Texas (like the El Paso County Coliseum and the United States Court House in El Paso). He was a member of the American Institute of Architects.
