= El Paso Public Libraries =

Public library system in Texas, US

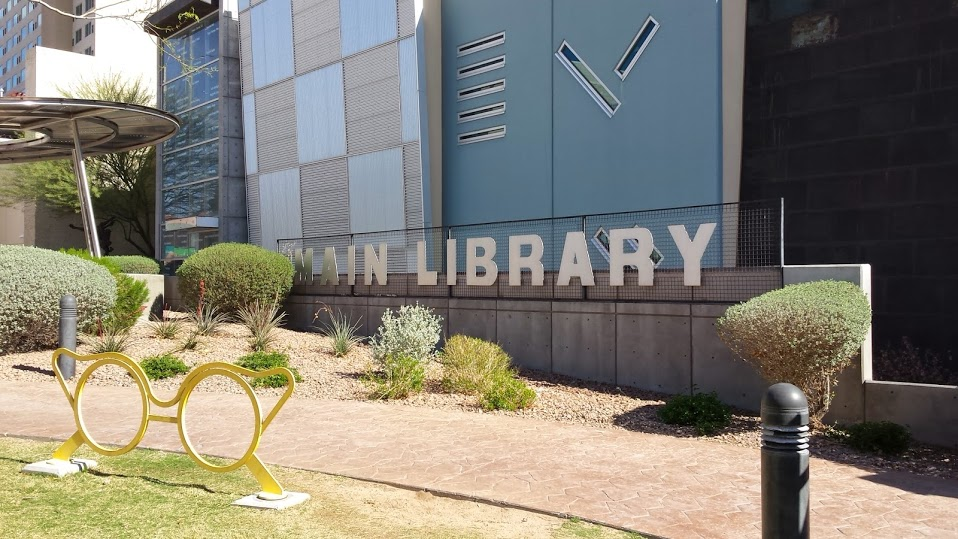
- The Main Library branch of the El Paso Public Libraries.
- 31.760502°N 106.490689°W
- Location: El Paso, Texas
- Established: 1894
- Branches: 13

Collection
- Size: 902,521

Other information
- Director: Norma Martinez
- Website: www.elpasolibrary.org

The El Paso Public Libraries is the municipal public library system of El Paso, Texas. The library serves the needs the public in El Paso, Texas, Chaparral, New Mexico and Ciudad Juarez, Mexico. It consists of 14 branches and one Bookmobile service. Multiple outreach services are also available including a Homebound service.

The main collection consists of 902,521 items in multiple formats including books, reference, downloadable eBooks, audiobooks, music and movies, DVDs, CDs, large-print books, magazines, and newspapers. Special Collections include a Government Documents Collection, Border Heritage Collection, and RAZA Collection.

== History ==
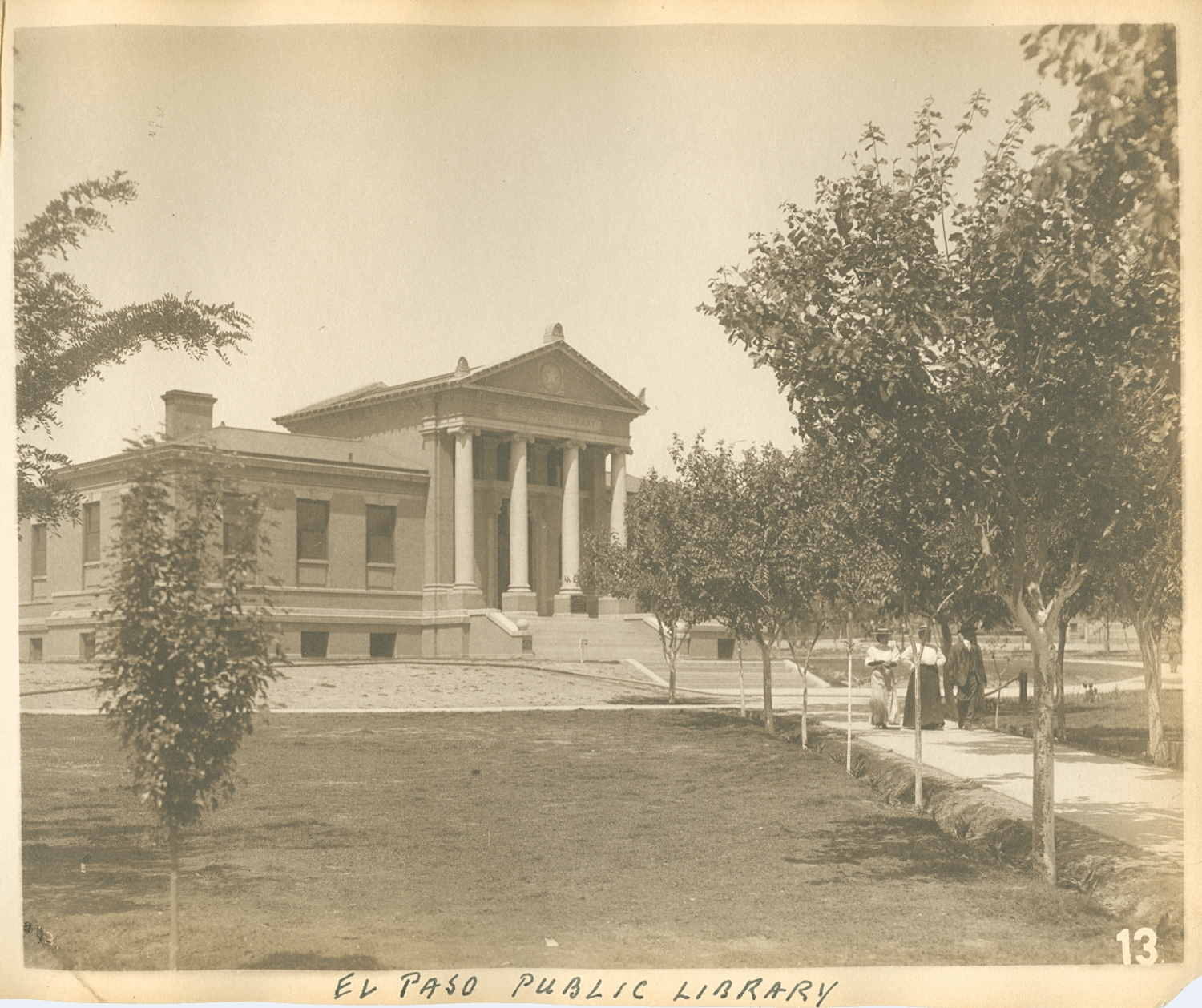
El Paso Public Library in 1909

=== Beginnings ===
The El Paso Public Library is the longest continuously active public library system in Texas. It was founded by Mary Irene Stanton, an El Paso area teacher. Stanton "single-handedly becomes founder of the El Paso Public Library" when in 1894, she donated her personal collection of 1,000 books for a boy's Reading Club which was housed in a room in the Sheldon Building. On June 1, 1895, women were also allowed to access this collection. In 1895, the El Paso Library Association was formed, with Mary Stanton as the president, to support further library efforts. On December 4, 1899, 4,000 books that were collectively owned by both Mary I. Stanton and Fannie J. Clark were moved from their location in the Sheldon Hotel to El Paso City Hall. Mary I. Stanton was the original librarian. She began cataloging the books in 1899. In 1900, Belle F. Read takes over as librarian.

Citizens wanted to have a separate library. Petitions were formed and circulated for the library to have its own location. Finally, assistance from Andrew Carnegie came in 1902. The Carnegie Foundation provided the El Paso Library Association a grant totaling $37,500 to build a separate library building to house the growing collection. In agreement with the "Carnegie Formula" which stipulates that a municipality must also provide support for the public library, the City Council agreed to vote in a tax to support the building efforts. The new library would be built on an old cemetery site, Buckler Square. The Library opened on April 25, 1904, in the newly named "Carnegie Square."

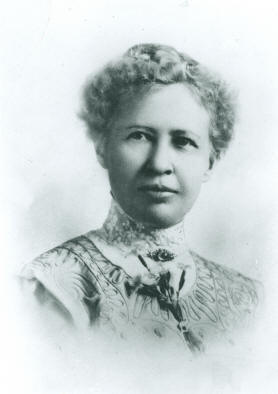
Mary Irene Stanton, founder of the El Paso Public Library.

=== The Library Grows ===
The new Carnegie library needed repair by 1919 and the collection had outgrown the building. In fact, many books were housed by operating "branches" in four different drug and grocery stores throughout El Paso starting in 1915. A second story needed to be added to the original Carnegie building. In 1920, the library's book collection is moved temporarily to the courthouse so that construction could take place. In 1945, a second official branch library is opened at the Tays Housing Project. In 1950, the Memorial Park Branch was opened. The Lower Valley Branch opened in 1960. In 1961, two branches: Richard Burges Branch and the Josephine Clardy Fox Branch were opened. In 1957, a Bookmobile was in operation with a second to serve underprivileged communities in El Paso to start operations in 1972.

By 1943, the library's collections had again outgrown its original downtown building. By 1951, a bond issue was approved by El Paso voters for $975,000 to build a new, larger library. The new library opened on September 12, 1954. The building was described as "Modern Southwestern" and contained artistic contributions from artists Tom Lea, Jose Cisneros and Ewing Waterhouse. The original Carnegie Building was demolished in 1968.

=== Outstanding Early Collections ===
In 1906, the El Paso Public Library was designated a Federal Depository as part of the Federal Depository Library Program. In 1908, the library began a Spanish-language collection of books. Later, librarian, Maud Durlin Sullivan would add to the Spanish language collection as well as grow a nationally recognized art and southwestern studies collection through the aid of donations and special funds. Maud Sullivan taught herself Spanish in order to better select appropriate books for the library's collection. Maud Sullivan was an avid patron of the arts and also helped create an important Mining Resources Collection for the library.

Children's services at the library date back to 1912 when librarian, Marion Weil-Tappan, promoted children's literature and the connection between the library and public schools. In 1922, the library was fully departmentalized to include a juvenile department.

== Special Library Departments ==
These departments of the El Paso Public Library have a specific focus and/or serve a targeted group of patrons.

=== Border Heritage ===
The Border Heritage Center is located at the Main Library and combines the library's Southwest, RAZA and Genealogy departments into a central location. The Border Heritage Center manages several special collections, some of which are digital. In addition to these collections, the Border Heritage department provides an online newspaper headline and obituary search for years 1997 through 2011.

- El Paso Times on Microfilm: The Border Heritage Center has microfilm readers and printers for archived El Paso Times newspaper articles. For those who cannot visit the library, the Center provides mail services.
- Southwest Collection: a historical archive of materials relating to the history of the El Paso-Juarez Border region. Beginning in 1902, the library has been collecting and archiving reference works, related monographs, photographs, architectural drawings, manuscripts, clippings, vertical files, maps, periodicals, postcards and other materials as they relate to the region.
- RAZA Collection: dating back to the 1970s the RAZA collection contains works by and about Mexican Americans.
- Genealogy Collection: relating specifically to individuals and families of any nationality that lived in the El Paso-Juarez Border Region.
- Historical Documents Online: a small collection of important El Paso area historical documents is available online from the Border Heritage Center.
- Otis A. Aultman Photo Collection: collects the historic photographs of Aultman, who lived and worked in El Paso. Part of the collection is available online.
- Yearbook Collection: this is an archive of El Paso area high school yearbooks. Starting in 2007 the library began to digitize this collection. Some yearbooks go back to 1885.

=== Government Documents ===
The El Paso Public Library is currently a selective Federal Depository for Government Documents, receiving 35% of documents published by the Government Printing Office (GPO). This department is also a depository for Texas State documents starting in 1966. Some items may be checked out and others are accessible online at the library's Government Documents page. On this page are guides and resources in addition to information about the Federal Depository Program.

== Branches ==
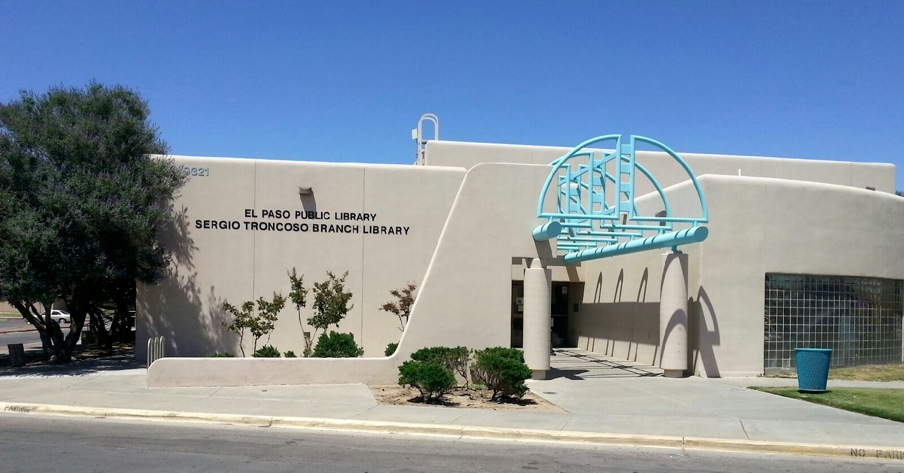
The Sergio Troncoso Branch of the El Paso Public Library, 9321 Alameda Avenue, El Paso, Texas.

All El Paso Public Library Branches share resources and are connected to the same database. Materials from one branch may be requested and received at another.

- Main Library (Downtown El Paso) at Oregon and Franklin
- Armijo Branch (Armijo Library) on 7th
- Richard Burges Regional Branch, on Dyer at Will Ruth
- Chamizal Community Center and Library, 2119 Cypress Ave.
- Cielo Vista Branch, on Hawkins
- Clardy Fox Branch, on Robert Alva
- Dorris Van Doren Regional Branch, on Redd Road
- Enrique Moreno Branch at Valle Bajo Community Center, 7380 Alameda
- Judge Edward S Marquez Branch, on Yarbrough
- Memorial Park Branch, on Copper
- Esperanza Acosta Moreno Regional Branch, on Pebble Hills
- Irving Schwartz Branch, on Dean Martin at Trawood
- Sergio Troncoso Branch (Ysleta) on Alameda
- Westside Branch, on Belvidere

In addition, the system offers a bookmobile service
