= DeGroff =

DeGroff is a surname. Notable people with the surname include:

- Alzina Orndorff DeGroff, American businesswoman and civic activist
- Dale DeGroff (born 1948), American bartender and author
- Edward DeGroff (1860–1910), American merchant and photographer
- John DeGroff, American Christian musician
- John W. DeGroff (1843–1895), American politician
- Rube DeGroff (1879–1955), American baseball player
