= List of tallest buildings in El Paso =

This list of tallest buildings in El Paso ranks skyscrapers and high-rises in the U.S. city of El Paso, Texas by height. The tallest building in the city is the 20-story WestStar Tower, which rises to 314 feet (96 m) and was recently completed in 2021. The second-tallest building in the city is the Wells Fargo Plaza, this tower was the tallest building in El Paso for 50 years from 1971 to 2021. The Wells Fargo Plaza rises to 302 feet (92 m). The third tallest building in the city is One San Jacinto Plaza, which rises to 280 feet (85 m).

The history of skyscrapers in El Paso began with the completion of the El Paso and Southwestern Railroad Office Building in 1907, this building is still standing and is now known as 416 N. Stanton St. It is 104 feet (32 m) tall and has seven floors. The Anson Mills Building, which is considered to be one of the city's first skyscraper, was completed in 1911. This 12-floor, 145-foot (44 m) structure stood as the tallest in El Paso until 1921. The city went through a building boom in the 1960s and 1970s, during which El Paso saw the completion of most of its tallest buildings, including the Wells Fargo Plaza and One San Jacinto Plaza. The city is going through another major building boom and many revitalization projects have been completed recently or are currently in progress in downtown. However, no El Paso buildings are among the tallest in the United States.

The most recently completed skyscraper in El Paso is the WestStar Tower, which rises 314 feet (96 m) and has 20 floors.

== Tallest buildings ==
This list ranks El Paso highrise buildings that stand at least 130 feet (40 m) tall, based on standard height measurement. Only completed buildings and under construction buildings that have been topped out are included.

Rank	Name	Image	Height ft / m	Floors	Year	Notes
1	WestStar Tower		314 (95)	20	2021	Construction on this skyscraper began in June 2018 and finished early 2021. It is El Paso's first office skyscraper to be built in almost 40 years.
2	Wells Fargo Plaza		302 ft (92 m)	21	1971	Was the tallest building in El Paso for approximately 50 years, originally the State National Bank Plaza. Tallest building constructed in El Paso in the 1970s. Previously known as the Norwest Plaza prior to the merger of Norwest Corporation and Wells Fargo.
3	One San Jacinto Plaza		280 ft (85 m)	20	1962	Originally the El Paso National Bank building, renamed in the 1980s to the Texas Commerce Bank Tower, and up until recently it was known as the Chase Tower.
4	Blue Flame Building		270 ft (82 m)	18	1954	Originally the El Paso Natural Gas tower, it has a tall recently renovated weather beacon on its roof. The height of the building goes up to 270 ft because of the beacon's height. When measured by roof height, the tower is 230 feet (70 m) tall. The Housing Authority of the City of El Paso purchased the building in 2017. The building recently went through a $55.3 million major renovation and the mixed-use project includes office space, retail space, and 120 low-income apartments. The building and weather beacon's renovations were fully completed in July 2021.
5	Stanton Tower		265 ft (81 m)	18	1982	Completed in March 1982 and originally known as the Kayser Building.
6	Plaza Hotel		239 ft (73 m)	19	1930	The Plaza was originally a Hilton high-rise hotel was designed by Trost & Trost and opened in 1930. After renovation the building is set to reopen as an independent hotel in 2020.
7	Hotel Paso del Norte Tower		230 ft (70 m)	17	1986	The original 10-story hotel opened on November 26, 1912, was designed by Trost & Trost and stood at 151 ft (46 m) high. The 17-story tower addition to the hotel was built in 1986. The hotel is currently undergoing a $70 million major renovation with plans to re-open in 2020 as The Hotel Paso del Norte, Autograph Collection by Marriot.
8	El Paso County Courthouse		230 ft (70 m)	14	1991	Completed in 1991, this post-modernist style courthouse uses sky-blue reflective glass in its design.
9	Aloft Hotel		217 ft (66 m)	15	1930	Completed in 1930 as the O. T. Bassett Tower and was one of the last buildings designed by famed architect, Henry Trost. Recently, underwent a $10 million renovation that was finished in May 2018 and opened up as an 89-room Aloft Hotel.
10	Albert Armendariz Sr. U.S. Federal Courthouse		205 ft (62 m)	9	2010	Opened in 2010, El Paso's federal courthouse was named in honor of the late El Paso judge and civil rights leader Albert Armendariz Sr. The final construction cost was $95.8 million.
11	One Texas Tower		205 ft (62 m)	15	1921	Completed in 1921 as the First Mortgage Company Building and was the first building to reach a height of over 200 ft in El Paso.
12	El Paso Children's Hospital at University Medical Center of El Paso		190 ft (58 m)	10	2012	The tower, designed by San Francisco based KMD Architects in collaboration with Architect of Record MNK Architects of El Paso houses two licensed hospitals El Paso Children's Hospital and the University Medical Center of El Paso. The building opened to the public on Valentine's Day 2012.
13	El Paso County Detention Facility		180 ft (55 m)	9	1983	
14	300 East Main		180 ft (55 m)	13	1964	Originally known as the Southwest National Bank building, later First City National Bank.
15	DoubleTree Hotel		168 ft (51 m)	17	1970	Originally built in 1970 as a Holiday Inn hotel. After several years of neglect, in 2009 the hotel went through an estimated $20-million renovation and was reopened as a DoubleTree Hotel.
16	Cortez Building		165 ft (50 m)	11	1926	
17	Anson Mills Building		157 ft (48 m)	12	1911	
18	William Beaumont Army Medical Center		155 ft (47 m)	10	1972	
19	Coronado Tower		150 ft (46 m)	12	1964	
20	Hotel Indigo		148 ft (45 m)	12	1964	Originally the Downtowner Motor Inn and later the Sheraton Hotel, it underwent a complete renovation in 2016.
21	UTEP College of Education Building		145 ft (44 m)	9	1971	

== See also ==
- List of tallest buildings in Amarillo
- List of tallest buildings in Austin
- List of tallest buildings in Corpus Christi
- List of tallest buildings in Dallas
- List of tallest buildings in Fort Worth
- List of tallest buildings in Houston
- List of tallest buildings in Lubbock
- List of tallest buildings in San Antonio
