= Luhring =

Luhring or Lühring is a surname. Notable people with the surname include:

- Anna Lühring (1796–1866), Prussian soldier
- Marie Luhring, American automotive engineer
- Oscar Raymond Luhring (1879–1944), American judge

== See also ==
- Luhr (disambiguation)
