= Wells Fargo Plaza (El Paso) =

Skyscraper in the USA

Coordinates: 31.7601°N 106.4860°W

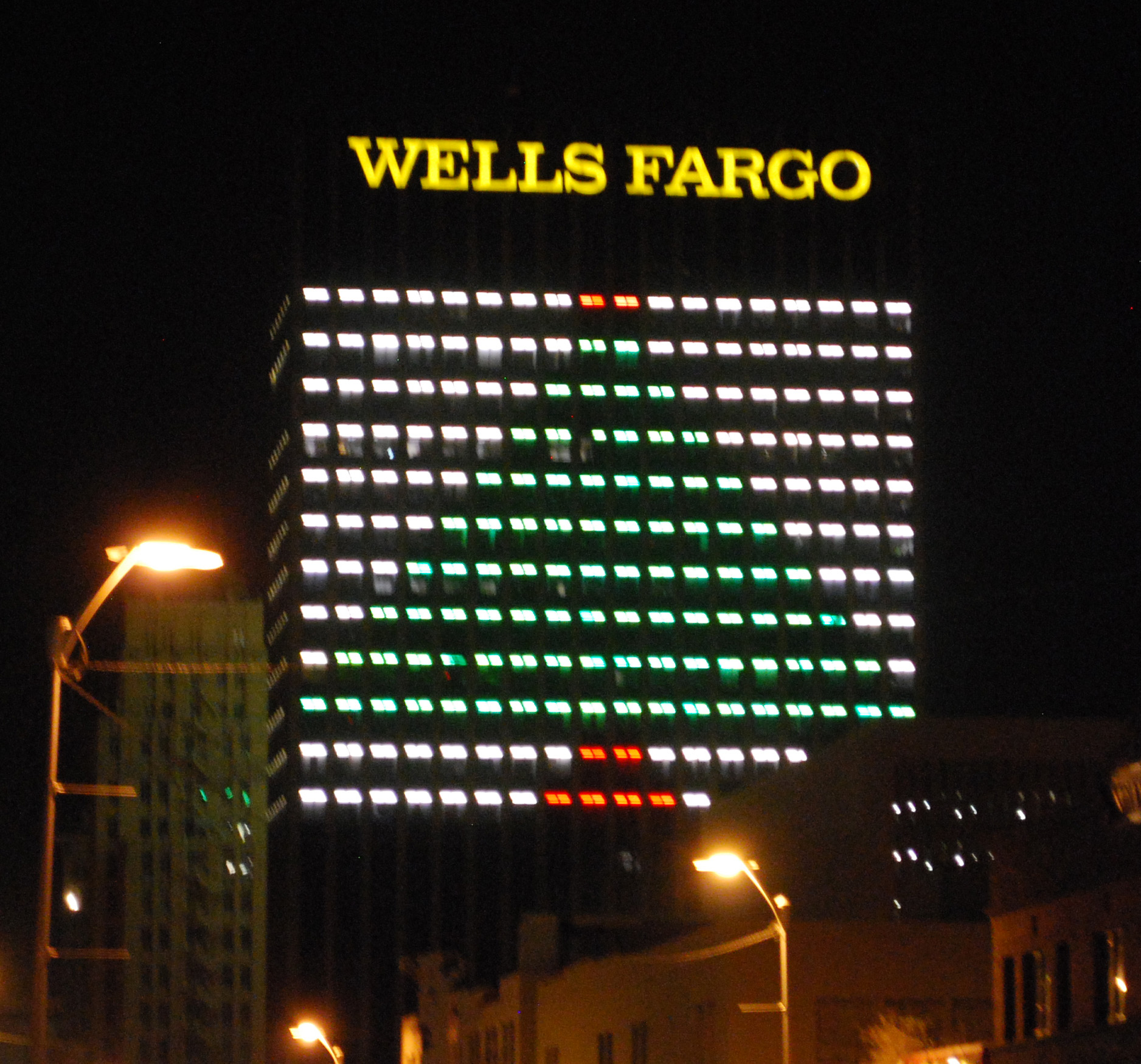
- Wells Fargo Plaza lit at night as a Christmas Tree during the holiday season
- Interactive map of the Wells Fargo Plaza area

General information
- Status: Completed
- Type: Class A Office Space
- Location: 221 North Kansas Street
- Groundbreaking: January 30, 1970
- Completed: 1971

Height
- Roof: 302 ft (92 m)
- Top floor: 21

Technical details
- Floor count: 21

Design and construction
- Architects: Charles Luckman and Associates
- Main contractor: C. H. Leavell & Co., Robert E. McKee, Inc.

The Wells Fargo Plaza is a high-rise skyscraper located on 221 North Kansas Street in Downtown El Paso, Texas, United States. It opened as the State National Bank Plaza on October 25, 1971. It is 302 feet (92 m) tall. It is designed in the International Style. Originally the tallest tower in El Paso, it was surpassed by the WestStar Tower in 2021.

The tower sits on a base three stories high, then rises to its full height. The repetitive angular windows add another International Style element of blocky appearance and expression of structure.

Ground was broken with a ceremony on January 30, 1971. Construction was handled jointly by two El Paso construction firms, C. H. Leavell & Co. and Robert E. McKee, Inc. Leavell was managing partner of construction with two-thirds of the building contract. McKee held one-third. The two firms agreed to jointly build the structure after bidding identical amounts initially and flipped a coin to determine who would get the controlling two-thirds of the contract.

The tower is lit at night with up to 13 horizontal white lines (originally 17). A U.S. Flag design is used during patriotic holidays, and a Christmas tree design is used during the holiday season. The letters "UTEP" are used during the football and basketball season for the University of Texas at El Paso, and, less frequently, the Texas Tech University logo is also used.

== See also ==
- List of tallest buildings in El Paso

Preceded by Chase Tower (El Paso)	Tallest Building in El Paso; 1971—2021; 92m	Succeeded by WestStar Tower
