= Plaza Hotel (El Paso, Texas) =

- U.S. National Register of Historic Places
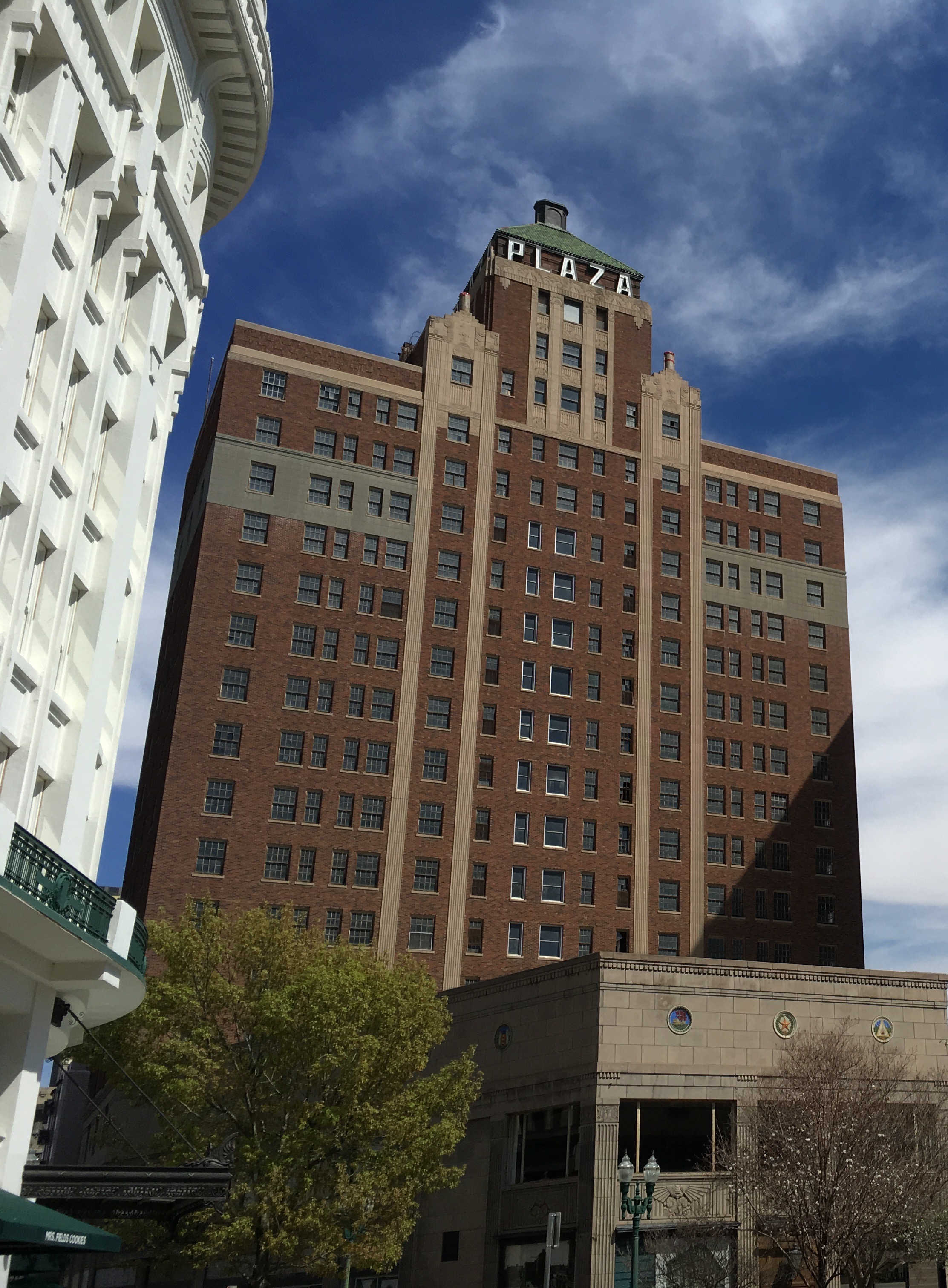
- Plaza Hotel

- Location within Texas Location within the United States
- Location: 106 Mills Ave., El Paso, Texas
- Coordinates: 31°45′30″N 106°29′17″W
- Area: less than one acre
- Built: 1930
- Architect: Trost & Trost
- Architectural style: Art Deco
- Website: The Plaza Hotel Pioneer Park
- MPS: Commercial Structures of El Paso by Henry C. Trost TR
- NRHP reference No.: 80004110
- Added to NRHP: September 24, 1980

The Plaza Hotel, formerly the Hilton Hotel, is a landmark skyscraper located at 106 Mills Avenue in El Paso, Texas, USA.

== History ==
The hotel was constructed on the site of the Sheldon Hotel, which burned down on April 9, 1929. The Sheldon served as the unofficial headquarters for many of the participants in the Mexican Revolution (1910-1920s) from both sides of the border.

In the fall of 1929, Conrad Hilton began construction. Nineteen days later the stock market crashed and the Great Depression began, yet construction continued. On November 30, 1930, the Hilton Hotel opened. At 239 feet (73 m) it surpassed the O. T. Bassett Tower to become the tallest building in El Paso; it is still the city's fifth tallest building. Designed by Trost & Trost, the hotel is an Art Deco styled 19-story reinforced cast-in-place concrete structure with setbacks at the 16th and 17th floors. It is faced with brown brick and concrete and crowned with Ludowici clay tile on its pyramidal roof. The exterior remains largely unaltered from its original form.

Conrad Hilton lived in the hotel for many years, as did his mother. Elizabeth Taylor, at the time married to Conrad’s son, Nicky Hilton, lived in the penthouse in 1955 while filming the classic movie Giant (1956).

Hilton sold the hotel in 1963, and it was renamed the Plaza Hotel. The hotel closed in 1991. In 2008, El Paso businessman Paul Foster purchased the property. In 2019 it was renovated at a cost of $78 million. The architecture firm for this renovation was Cooper Carry. It reopened in June 2020 as The Plaza Hotel Pioneer Park.

== Historical markers ==
Historical markers located on the Plaza Hotel include the First Kindergarten in Texas and The Woman’s Club of El Paso. Historical markers located in the vicinity of the hotel include Chinatown and the Anson Mills Building. Both markers are located across Mills Avenue at El Paso Street.

== About the hotel ==
The Plaza hotel has 130 rooms with an adjacent car parking garage.

== Gallery ==
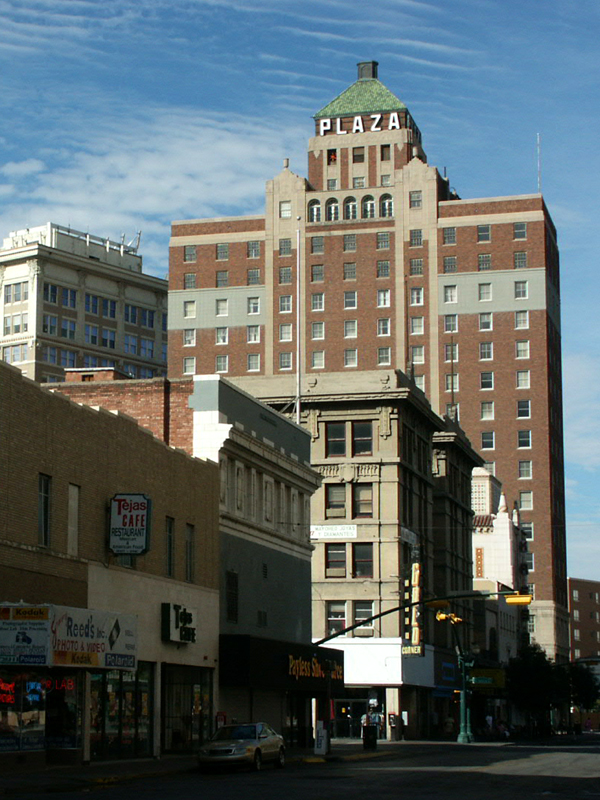
Northeast side of building

== See also ==
- National Register of Historic Places listings in El Paso County, Texas

Preceded by Bassett Tower	Tallest Building in El Paso; 1930—1971; 73m	Succeeded by Chase Tower (El Paso)
