= Hotel Cortez (El Paso, Texas) =

Historic building in El Paso, Texas, US

- U.S. National Register of Historic Places
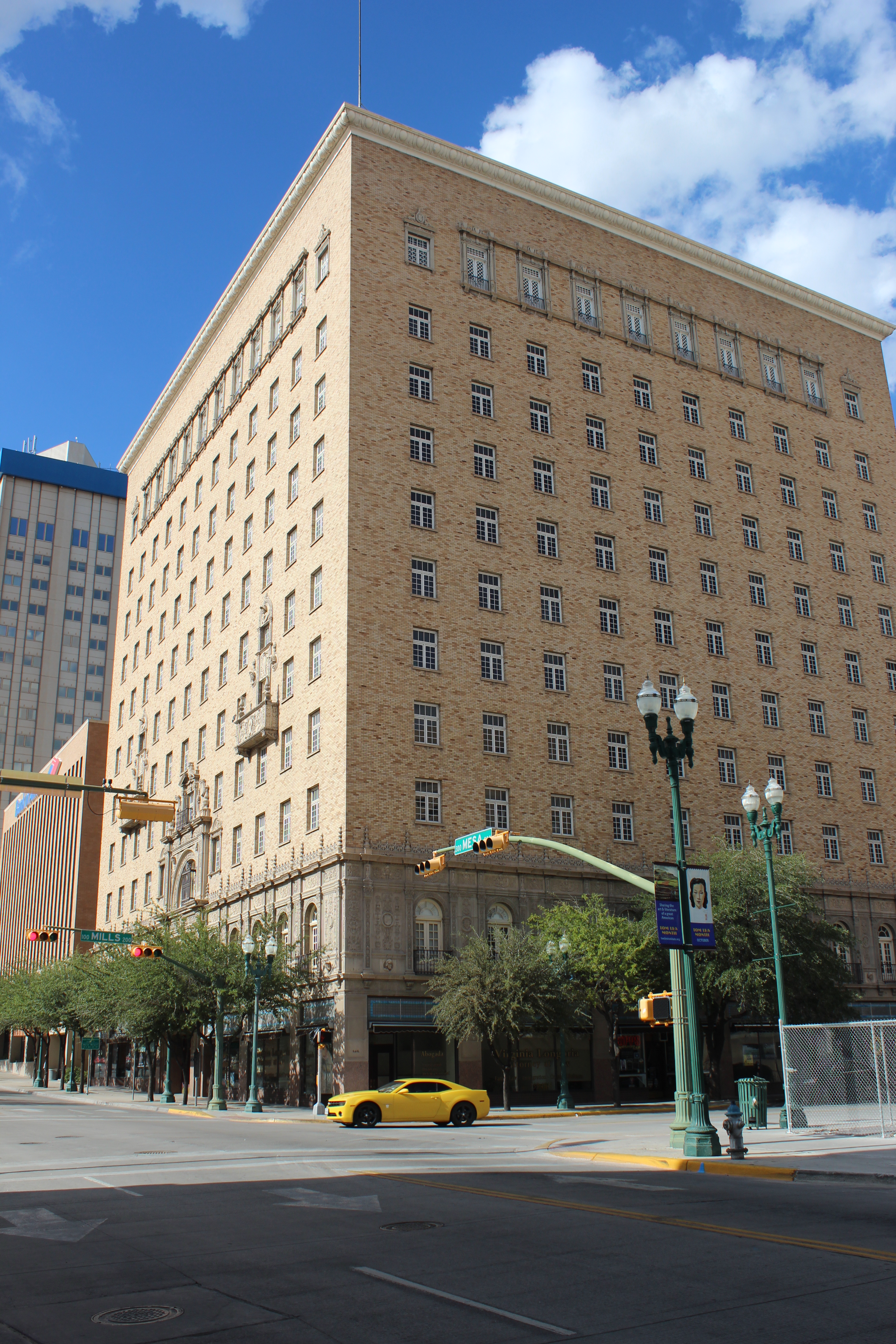
- The Hotel Cortez in 2014

- Location within Texas Location within the United States
- Location: 300 North Mesa Street, El Paso, Texas
- Coordinates: 31°45′35″N 106°29′14″W
- Area: less than one acre
- Built: 1926
- Architect: Trost & Trost
- Architectural style: Renaissance, Spanish Colonial Revival
- MPS: Commercial Structures of El Paso by Henry C. Trost TR
- NRHP reference No.: 80004105
- Added to NRHP: September 24, 1980

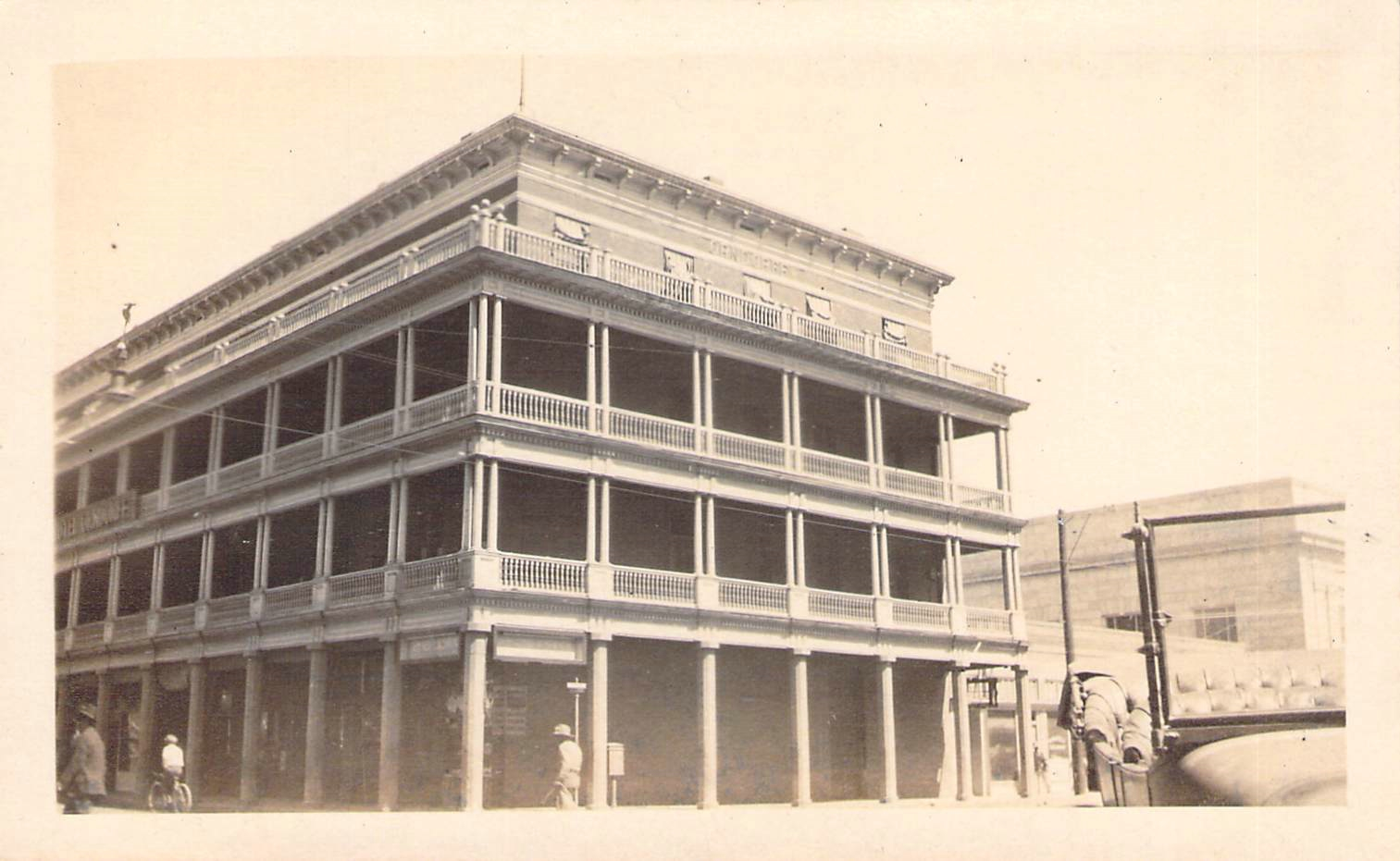
Vendome Hotel was the predecessor of Hotel Cortez. Renamed to Hotel Orndorff in 1900 and demolished in 1925 to make way for building of the Hotel Cortez.

The Hotel Cortez is a historic eleven-story building in El Paso, Texas.

== History ==
The Hotel Orndorff in El Paso was built in 1926 for Alzina Orndorff DeGroff. DeGroff purchased the Vendome Hotel at the corner of Mills and Mesa Streets in 1899. In 1900, she renamed it the Orndorff Hotel. In 1925, she demolished the hotel in 1925 to make way for a new Hotel Orndorff, that would later become the Hotel Cortez.

The Hotel Orndorff was designed by Trost & Trost. It cost $1.4 million to build. Reportedly, DeGroff put up $1 million of her own money to build the new hotel. However, she unexpectedly died just one month before its completion, The Orndorff family continued to operate the hotel until 1933 when it was purchased by Harry L. Hussmann and the Hussmann Hotel Company and renamed the Hotel Hussmann and then the Hotel Cortez in 1935.

President John F. Kennedy stayed overnight on June 5, 1963. The hotel closed in 1970 and became the El Paso Job Corps Center, by lease with the Department of Labor. The structure was fully converted to an office building in 1984. It has been listed on the National Register of Historic Places since September 24, 1980.

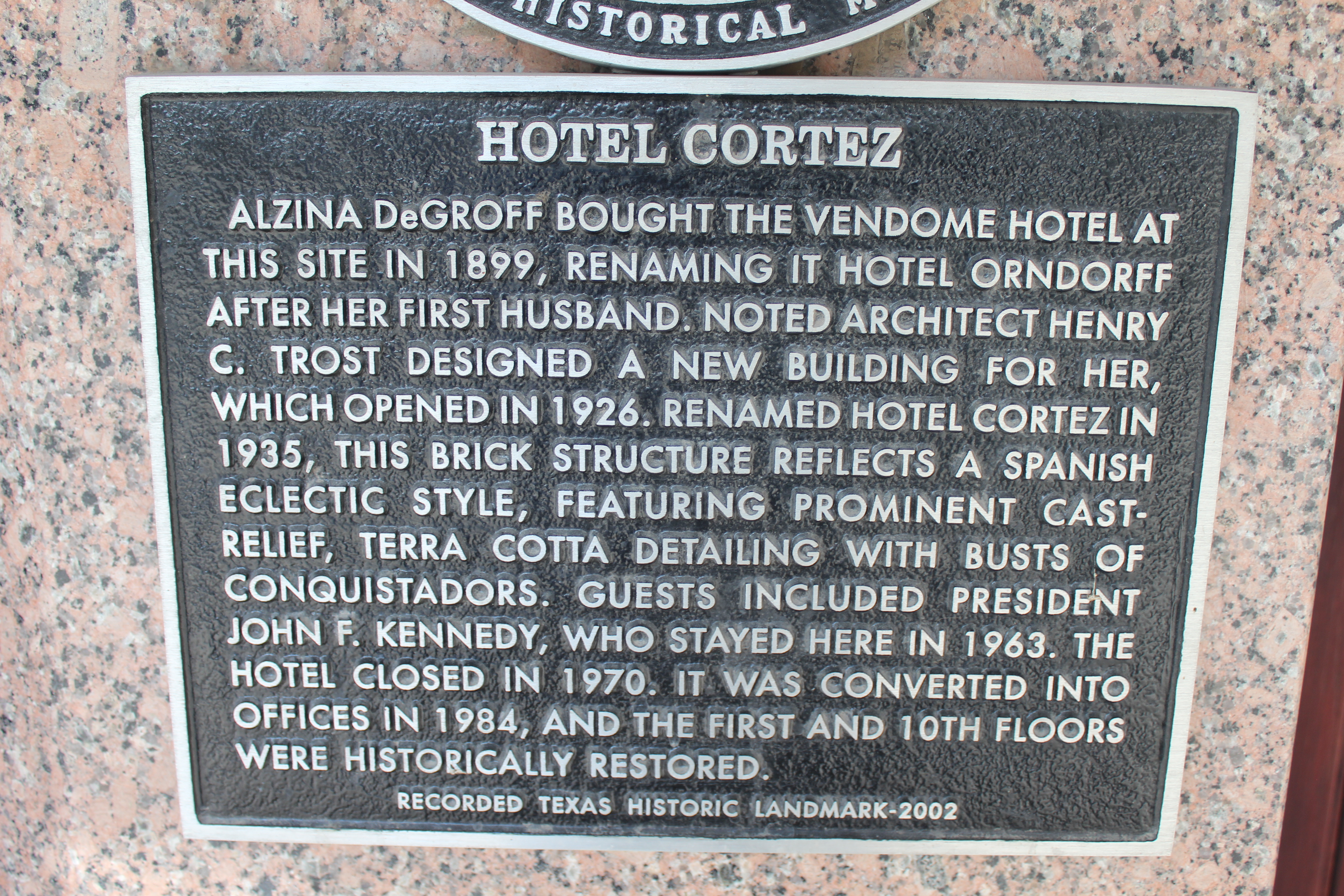
Historical marker.
