= International Museum of Art =

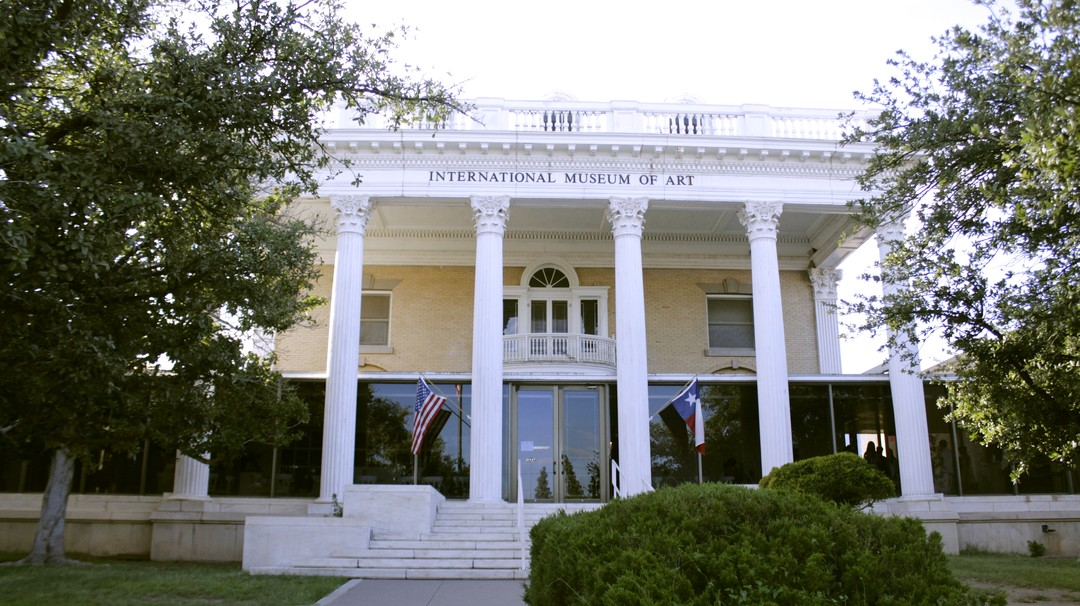
- El Paso International Museum of Art
- Established: 1924
- Location: El Paso, Texas, United States
- Coordinates: 31°46′15″N 106°28′55″W
- Type: Art museum
- Collection size: 475
- Founder: Kate Moore Brown
- Website: internationalmuseumofart.net

The International Museum of Art is a museum in El Paso, Texas housed in a historic residence designed by Henry C. Trost. The home was the W.W. Turney residence built for state legislator, lawyer, and rancher William Ward Turney in 1908. The International Museum of Art shares history with the El Paso Museum of Art, which occupied the Turney building until 1998. After it moved into its new building, the International Museum of Art reopened in 1999.

== About ==
The International Museum of Art takes up around 14,000 square feet. The museum also has a 168-seat auditorium and space for art classes.

== History ==
The El Paso International Museum Association began in 1924 and the group started collecting art at a rapid pace. Kate Moore Brown was a leader in helping to create the museum, which started with the purchase of several display cases for displaying the Percival Henderson collection. The museum's association planned to open a building in 1929, but were deterred because of the Great Depression. The group received a Texas state charter in 1930. The Women's Club of El Paso helped promote the idea of the museum.

In 1941, they moved into former home of former State Senator William Ward Turney. The property was owned by the City of El Paso and the museum was leasing the W.W. Turney house on 1205 Montana Street. In 1944, the museum's board began to raise money to pay for the taxes owed on the house. The International Museum of Art formally opened its doors on May 2, 1947.

The museum was planned to be expanded in the late 1950s at a cost of around $725,000 in funds from a bond issue. The expansion would include two new art wings, an auditorium and a children's section. The renovations took place in 1960 with the architectural firm of Carrol and Daeuble and Associates. The Kress collection, donated by the Samuel H. Kress Foundation, was installed in the building in May 1961. Around this time, the museum became known as the El Paso Museum of Art. The El Paso Museum of Art moved from the Turney home in 1998. The new location was in Downtown El Paso and initially, Mayor Carlos Ramirez wanted the Turney building to house offices for museum administration.

In 1999, forty-two charter members made up the new El Paso International Museum of Art. The volunteers supporting the museum created an International Association for the Visual Arts and remained in the Turney building. The association began to lease the building from the City of El Paso. They also began an El Paso Artists Hall of Fame, which honored two artists a year.

== Collection ==
The museum has over 450 paintings and 25 sculptures on display.

The International Museum of Art obtained a kachina doll collection donated by Deane Miller in 2000. The collection was valued at $40,000.

== Website ==
- International Museum of Art website
