= WestStar Tower =

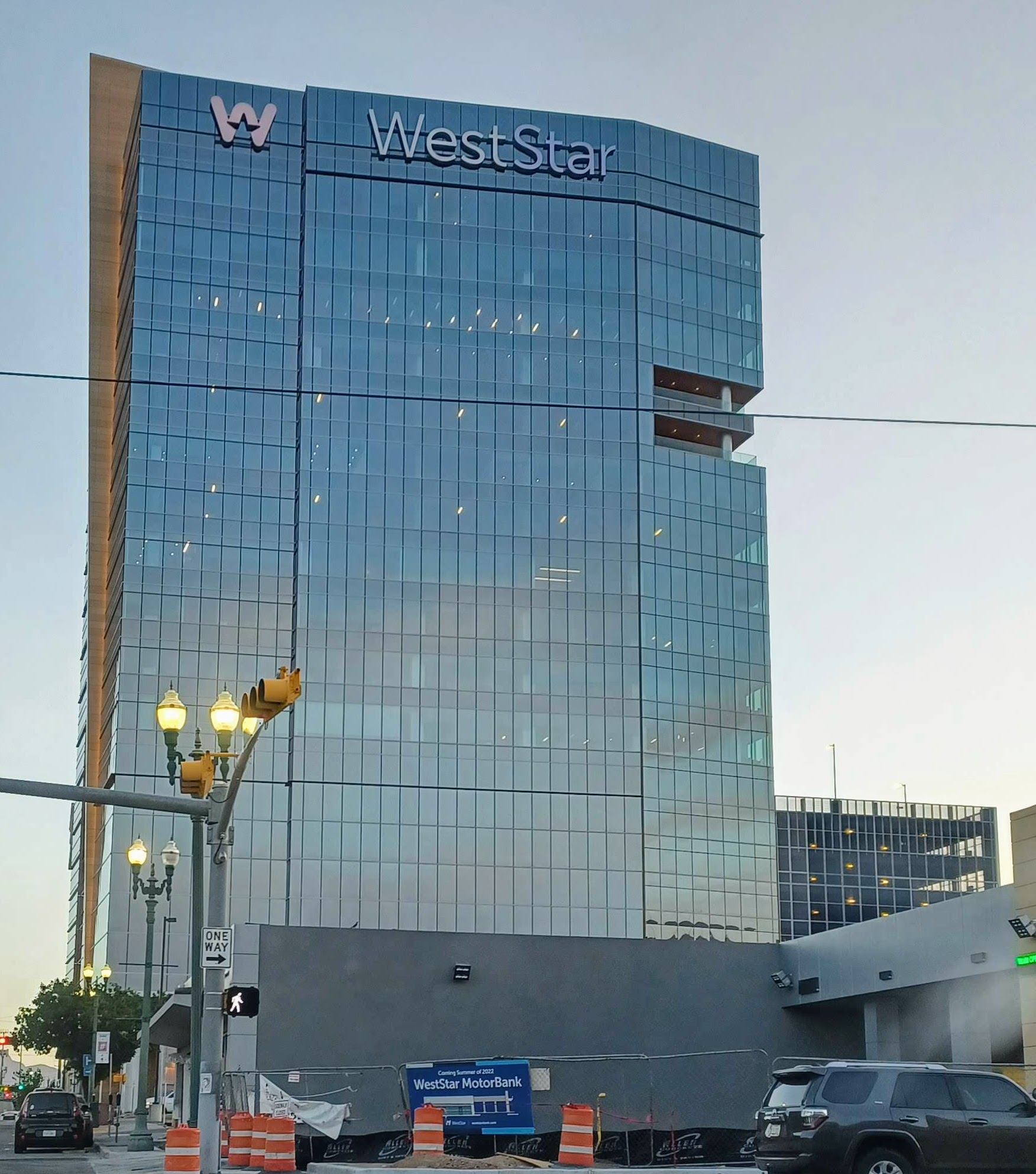
- Viewed from the northeast in 2022
- Interactive map of the WestStar Tower area
- Alternative names: WestStar Tower at Hunt Plaza

General information
- Status: Completed
- Type: Class A Office Building
- Location: 601 North Mesa Street, El Paso, Texas
- Coordinates: 31.76195°N 106.49009°W
- Construction started: 2018
- Opened: 2021
- Cost: $85 million (estimated)

Height
- Height: 314 ft (96 m)

Technical details
- Floor count: 20
- Floor area: 262,000 sq ft (24,300 m^{2})

Design and construction
- Architect: Duda|Paine
- Main contractor: Moss

Website
- www.weststartower.com

The WestStar Tower (alternatively the WestStar Tower at Hunt Plaza) is a high-rise located at 601 North Mesa Street in Downtown El Paso, Texas. It was completed in 2021 and surpassed the Wells Fargo Plaza as the tallest building in El Paso, with a height of 314 ft (96 m). The tower has 20 stories in total. Covering an entire city block, the tower has a ground-level park area, outdoor seating and dining, and about 262,000 square feet (24,300 m²) of Class A+ office space. Alongside this, it also has 13,000 square feet (1,200 m²) of office and retail space on the ground floor. On completion, the building was the first skyscraper above 300 feet built in El Paso for nearly 50 years.

== History ==
=== 2018 ===
==== June–December ====
- On June 20, 2018, Hunt Companies and WestStar announced the groundbreaking of a multi-level, multi-tenant Class A office high-rise skyscraper in Downtown El Paso. The land on which the tower would be built, formerly a parking lot between Mesa Street and Missouri Avenue, was cleared for building. The tower will become the new corporate headquarters for Hunt and WestStar.
- On December 20, 2018, construction went vertical on the tower.

=== 2019 ===
==== January–February ====
- The ground floor of the tower was completed in early February.

=== 2020 ===
==== January–April ====
- In early March, the estimated completion date of the tower was moved to winter 2020. This date was further changed to early 2021.

==== May ====
- On May 21, the last steel beam was placed on the tower.

== Tenants ==
- Corralito Steakhouse
  The first restaurant tenant to occupy space in the building will be Corralito Steakhouse, a local restaurant, occupying 4,000 of the about 13,000 square feet of retail space on the ground floor. Corralito has multiple other locations in El Paso and Ciudad Juárez.
- Hunt Companies (corporate headquarters)
  Hunt will move its corporate headquarters to the new WestStar Tower. The Hunt Family Foundation will also be located in the tower.
- WestStar (corporate headquarters)
  WestStar, the building's namesake, will operate a full service banking facility at the tower. The tower will also become the corporate headquarters for the company. WestStar is a local banking company that operates in Ciudad Juárez, Las Cruces, and El Paso.

== See also ==
- List of tallest buildings in El Paso

Preceded by Wells Fargo Plaza	Tallest Building in El Paso; 2021–present 96m	Succeeded by None
