= One San Jacinto Plaza (El Paso, Texas) =

Coordinates: 31.7608°N 106.4883°W

- Interactive map of the One San Jacinto Plaza area

General information
- Type: High-rise office building
- Location: 201 East Main Street; El Paso, Texas, U.S.
- Completed: 1962
- Height: 280 ft (85 m)

Technical details
- Floor count: 20

Design and construction
- Architects: George L. Dahl, Carroll & Daeuble
- Main contractor: Robert E. McKee, Inc.

One San Jacinto Plaza is a 20-story office high-rise building located at 201 East Main Street in downtown El Paso, Texas, United States.

It is a very prominent part of the El Paso skyline and is most visible heading eastbound on I-10. It is the second tallest skyscraper in El Paso, behind Wells Fargo Plaza. Currently, among its tenants are restaurants, healthcare groups, law offices, accounting firms, family offices, insurance companies, and financial institutions. It was built in the international style of architecture, which was very popular during the time period in which the building was constructed.

The building was originally named the El Paso National Bank Tower when it opened in 1962, it was also known as the Texas Commerce Bank Tower in the 1980s and early 1990s. By the mid-1990s, Chase Bank had acquired all Texas Commerce Bank locations and the tower's name was changed to Chase Tower.

In 2017, Chase Bank announced that it would be moving out and losing the naming rights to the tower. Jamie Gallagher, senior vice president of the Borderplex Realty Trust, which owns the building, said the El Paso real estate investment trust was working with a new tenant to possibly replace Chase, and she said, put its brand on the building.

In September 2018, Borderplex Realty announced that the tower's name would be changed to One San Jacinto Plaza. A new LED lighting system was added in late 2018 to bathe the building's exterior in light, which can be done in various colors at night.

| Preceded by Plaza Hotel (El Paso) | Tallest Building in El Paso; 1962—1971; 85m | Succeeded by Wells Fargo Plaza (El Paso) |
