= Luhr =

Luhr or Luhrs may refer to:

== People ==
- Fredrik Luhr Dietrichson (b. 1988), a Norwegian musician
- Grant Luhrs, an American musician and a member of the duo Luhrs & Crawford
- Henry E. Luhrs, former owner of the Beistle Company
- Jake Luhrs (b. 1985), an American musician
- Jorge Avendaño Lührs, a Mexican musician
- Katarina Luhr (born 1973), Swedish politician
- Lucas Luhr (b. 1979), a German factory racing driver
- Simon Luhrs (b. 1970), an Australian footballer
- William Luhr, an American author

== Places ==
- Luhrs Building, a historic building in Phoenix, Arizona
- Luhrs Tower, a skyscraper office building in Phoenix, Arizona
