= Hallway =

Room used to connect other rooms

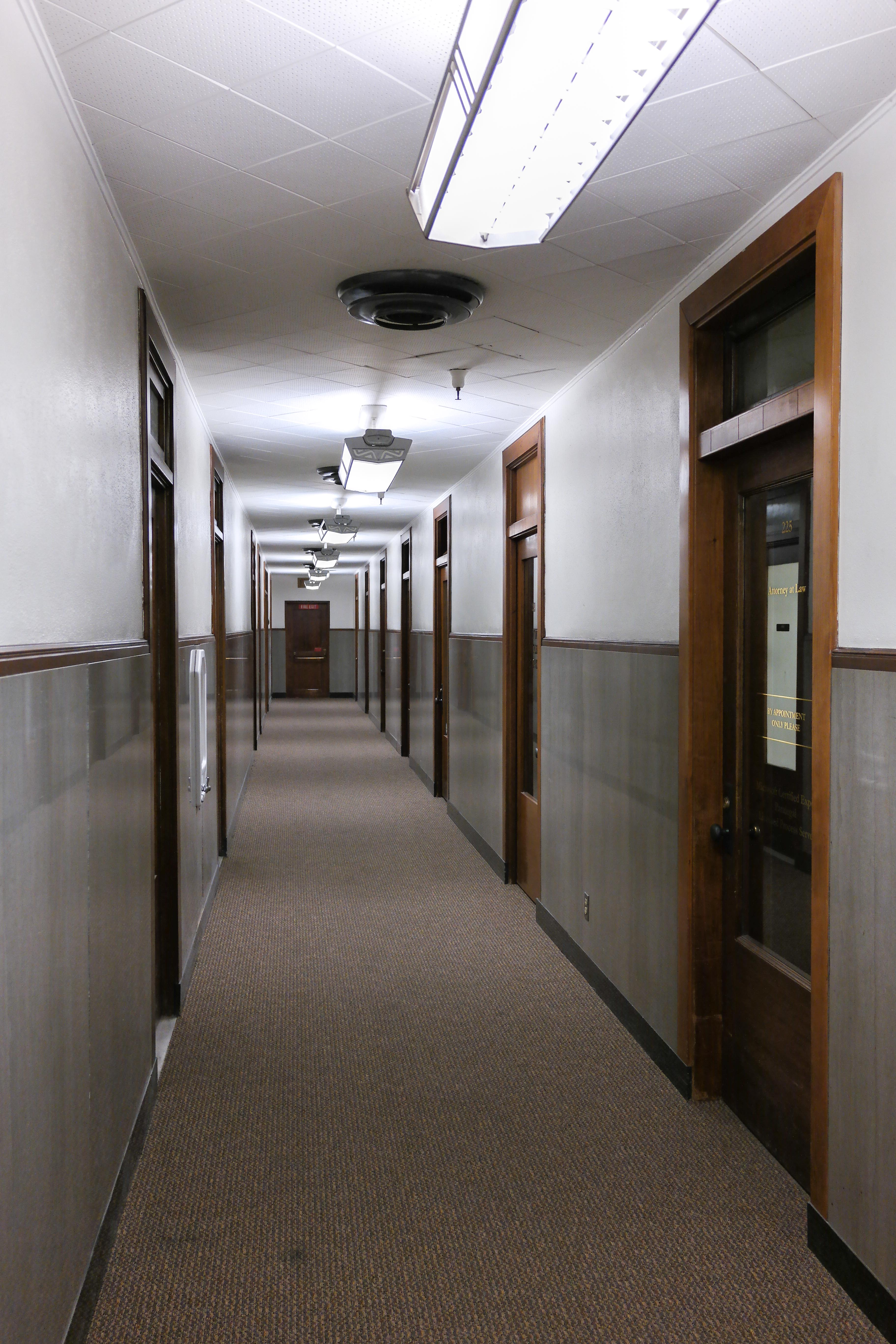
Hallway in Luhrs Tower, 1929 office building in Phoenix, Arizona

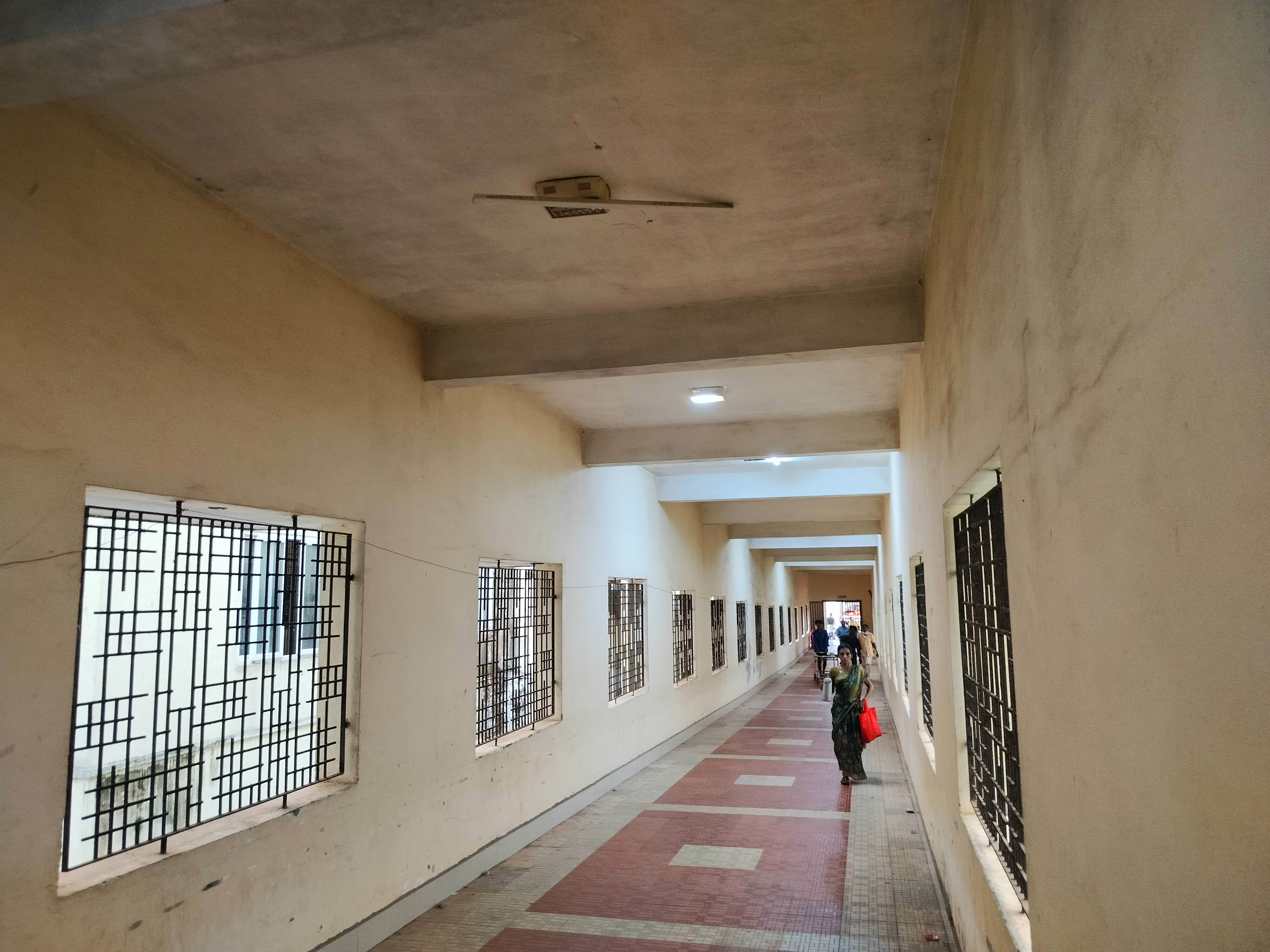
Corridor inside a Government Medical College in Kollam, India

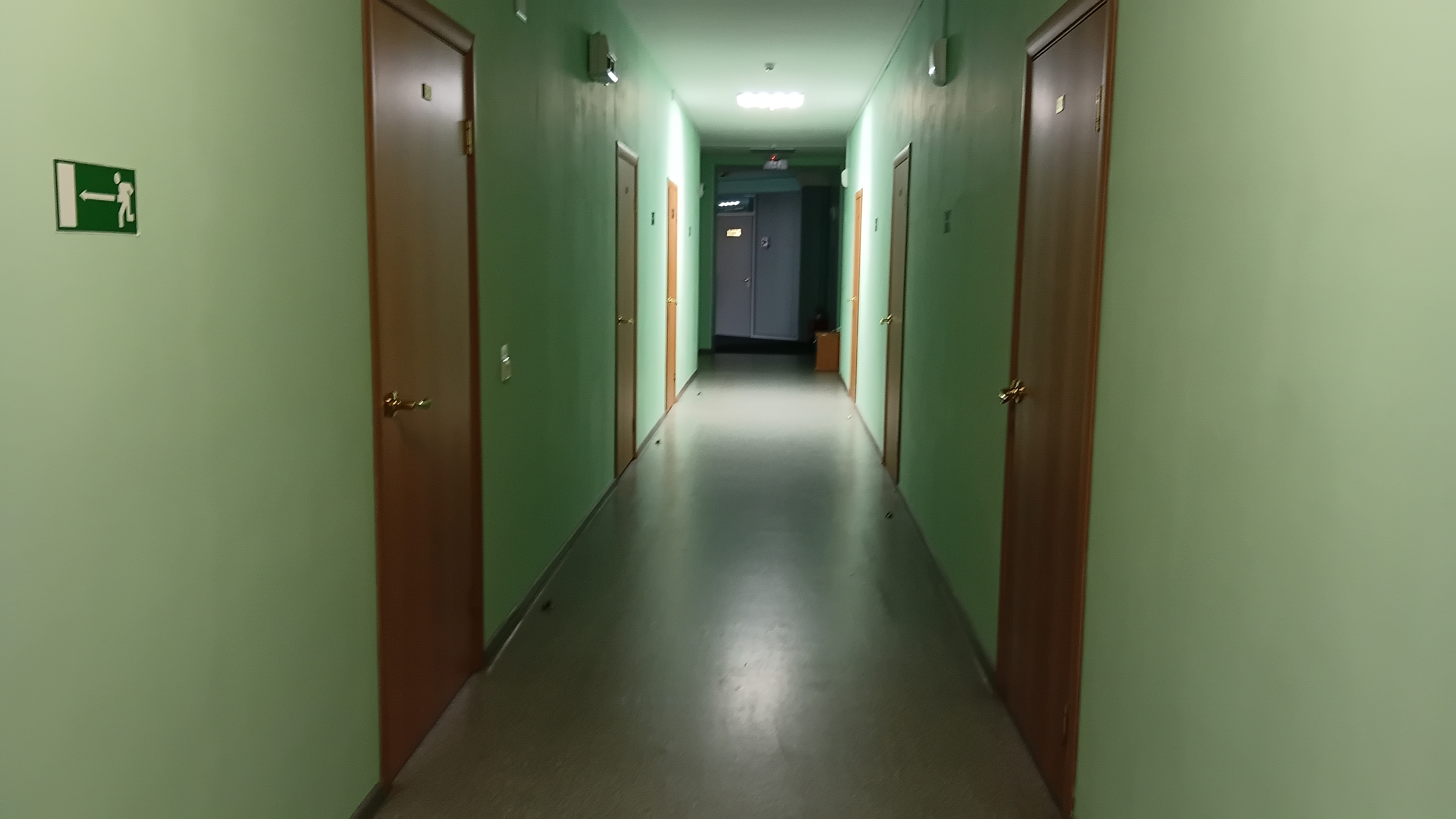
Hallway inside a motel in Sverdlovsk oblast, Russia

A hallway (also known as passage, passageway, corridor or hall) is an interior space in a building that is used to connect multiple rooms. They are generally long and narrow.

Hallways must be sufficiently wide to ensure buildings can be evacuated during a fire, and to allow people in wheelchairs to navigate them. The minimum width of a hallway is governed by building codes. The minimum width of hallways in residences of the United States is 36 inches (910 mm). Hallways are wider in higher-traffic settings, such as schools and hospitals.

== History ==
Prior to the 16th century, European aristocratic houses had a few great rooms used interchangeably as bedrooms, living rooms, and dining rooms. People walked through private spaces at any time. In 1597, John Thorpe was the first recorded architect to replace multiple connected rooms with rooms along a hallway, each accessed by a separate door.

The corridor allowed rooms to be reached without passing through neighboring spaces, still uncommon enough to need explanation in the 18th century. By the Victorian era, corridors divided space between family and servants.

== Layout ==
Single-loaded hallways have rooms facing in the same direction for sun exposure. Double-loaded hallways have rooms opening on both sides. The most efficient organization is to make back-to-back units enter from a double-loaded corridor.
