= William Ward Turney =

Texas politician

William Ward Turney (July 11, 1861 - March 23, 1939) was a lawyer, rancher, state representative, and state senator in Texas. His former home now houses the International Museum of Art in El Paso. The residence was designed by Trost and Trost and built in 1908. Turney moved to El Paso in 1892. A Democrat, he served in the Texas legislature from 1893 until January 13, 1903. He had an impressive mustache.
