= Alzina Orndorff DeGroff =

American businesswoman

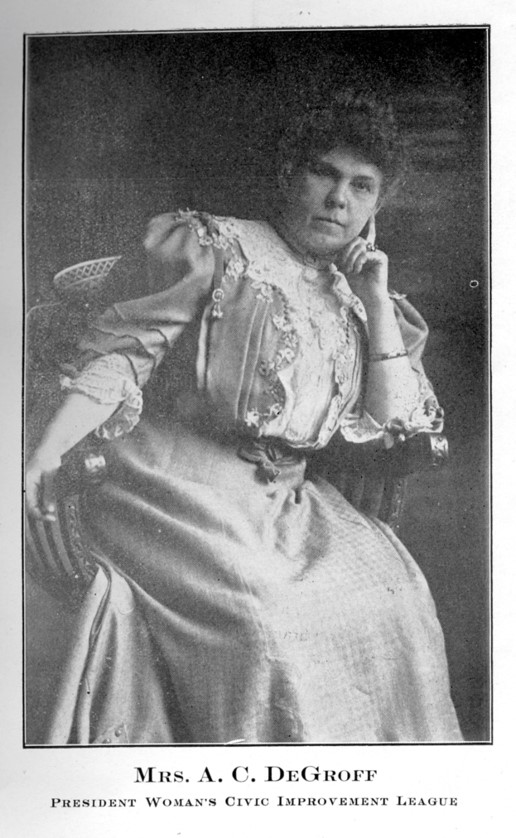
Alzina Orndorff DeGroff c. 1905

Alzina Orndorff DeGroff (1858/1859—August 10, 1926), born Alzina Caroline Allis, was an American businesswoman who was involved in civic causes in El Paso, Texas, and West Texas.

DeGroff was born as Alzina Caroline Allis in Washington, Louisiana. She married Lee H. Orndorff in 1876 and the couple had three sons. They moved to Tucson, Arizona. Lee Orndorff died after a railroad accident in 1887. Her husband's death propelled Alzina into the business world.

Alzina married Charles DeGroff in 1890 and the couple became involved in building hotels. In 1899, the family moved to El Paso, Texas, after Alzina decided to buy the Vendome hotel which she renamed Hotel Orndorff. The Hotel Orndorff was a huge success for Alzina and she went on to buy more real estate around the area and in the Lower Valley. In March 1925, she began work on a new hotel that is now known as Hotel Cortez. This hotel was designed by Henry C. Trost.

Alzina DeGroff became the first president of the El Paso Paso Civic Improvement League, which was associated with the El Paso Woman's Club, in 1905. She was also the first president of the El Paso Equal Franchise League, serving for a short time. The Franchise League was formed in January of 1915 and the first meeting was held at the Hotel Orndorff. She was appointed to the original board of the directors of the Texas Technological College in Lubbock by Governor Pat Morris Neff in 1923.

DeGroff died on August 10, 1926, aged 67, after a short illness. Her funeral was held outside of her home and flags of El Paso City Hall were lowered to half-staff after news of her death.
