= The Holland Hotel =

Hotel in Alpine, Texas, United States

Coordinates: 30°21′27″N 103°39′46″W

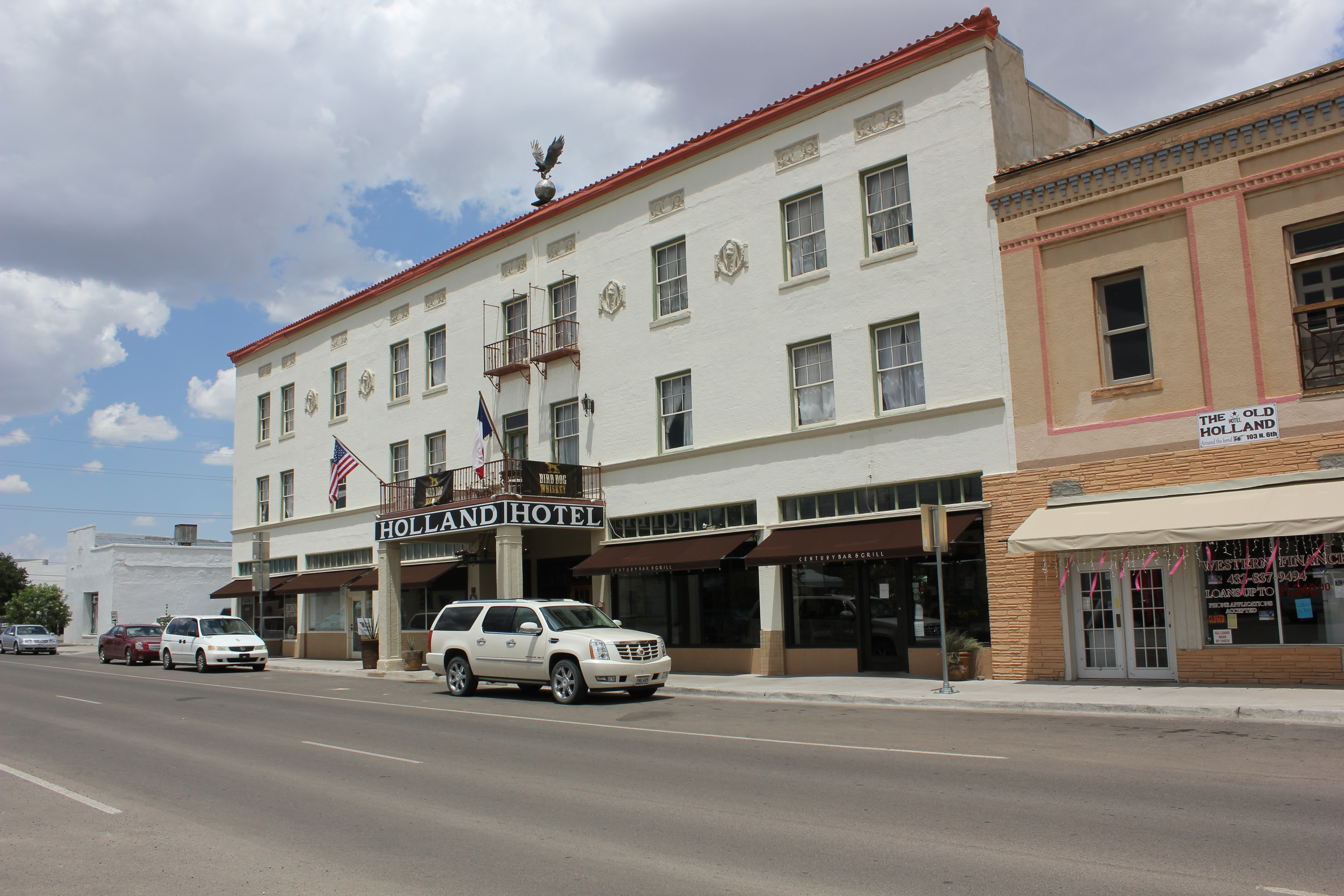

The Holland Hotel is a hotel in Alpine, Texas that has been operating since 1912. The hotel was built by Mr. John R. Holland, a prominent cattleman at the time. According to Mr. Holland, Alpine needed a place where the travelers of the booming mining industry could stay the night. The hotel was finished during the mercury-mining boom, therefore becoming very successful in the community as both a business and a social and civic center. After Mr. Holland’s death, his son Clay took over the hotel. In 1928, Clay Holland commissioned the architects Trost and Trost and built a new building a few store fronts away from the original Holland Hotel. It was built, in the Spanish Colonial Revival style for $250,000. Along with many of the Trost creations, The Holland Hotel was seen as a fairyland adorned with beautiful Spanish decorations and was eventually recognized as a Texas Historic Landmark in 1980. It was listed on the National Register of Historic Places in 2025.

== History ==
In 1946, Clay Holland sold the hotel to George Hotels, Inc. under the control of Lawrence George of Mount Pleasant, Texas. Mr. George ran the hotel for three years, and in 1949 sold it to Frank Hofues. In 1957, Mr. Hofues died. The trustees of the Mr. Hofues' estate sold the hotel in 1957 to James C. Henderson, who in turn, has financial difficulties, and in 1959, the facilities were deeded to I.C. Roark, who continued to operate the hotel for about 10 years. Then in 1969, the hotel was closed down. and all the equipment and furnishings were sold. The building remained empty for several years. Then in 1972, Gene Hendryx arranged to purchase the hotel from Mr. Roark's estate, with the stipulation that all the furnishing be removed from the building. Therefore an auction was held and Hendryx took control of the building and completed a renovation, changing it from a hotel to an office building.

In 1985, the McFarland family, Robert, Myra Jo, and their daughter Carla, purchased the Holland Hotel, with Carla McFarland as the general manager, and slowly turned it back to a hotel as tenants' leases expired. They opened an upscale restaurant called McFarland's that is still talked about. This was followed by a number of quality restaurants until the McFarlands sold the property in the first decade of the 21st century. The McFarland family, especially Carla, is the longest-standing owner to date of over 20 years. In the early 21st century, Carla McFarland hired Texas muralist, Style Read, along with other local artisans, to restore the Holland's lobby to the grandeur of the Trost and Trost original design. A surprising palette of color was discovered and the hotel took on a festive atmosphere. Much of that work was covered up by new owners. In September 2011, The Holland Hotel was acquired by Greenwich Hospitality Group, which restored the building to its former glory with 24 guest rooms and a full-service restaurant, The Century Bar and Grill.

== See also ==
- Recorded Texas Historic Landmarks in Brewster County
