= O. T. Bassett Tower =

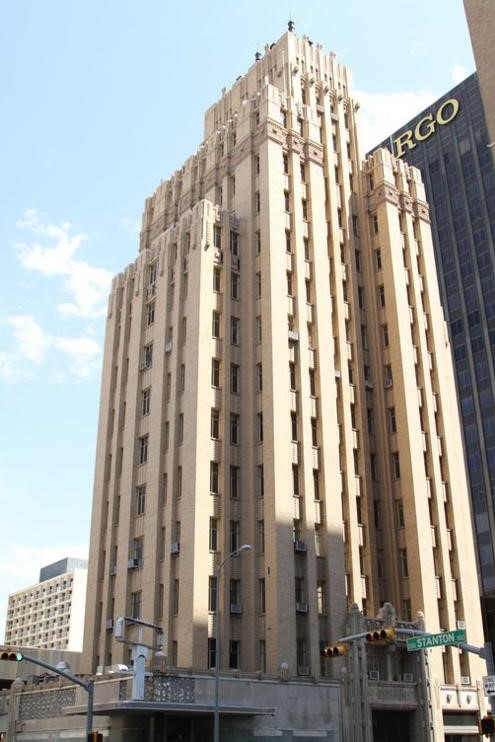
- The O. T. Bassett Tower

- Location within Texas Location within the United States

General information
- Status: open
- Architectural style: Moderne, Art Deco, Stepped skyscraper
- Location: 303 Texas Avenue; El Paso, Texas
- Coordinates: 31.7597°N 106.4862°W
- Construction started: 1929
- Completed: 1930

Technical details
- Floor count: 15

Design and construction
- Architect: Trost & Trost
- Main contractor: Robert E. McKee
- O. T. Bassett Tower
- U.S. National Register of Historic Places
- Area: less than one acre
- MPS: Commercial Structures of El Paso by Henry C. Trost TR
- NRHP reference No.: 80004101
- Added to NRHP: September 24, 1980

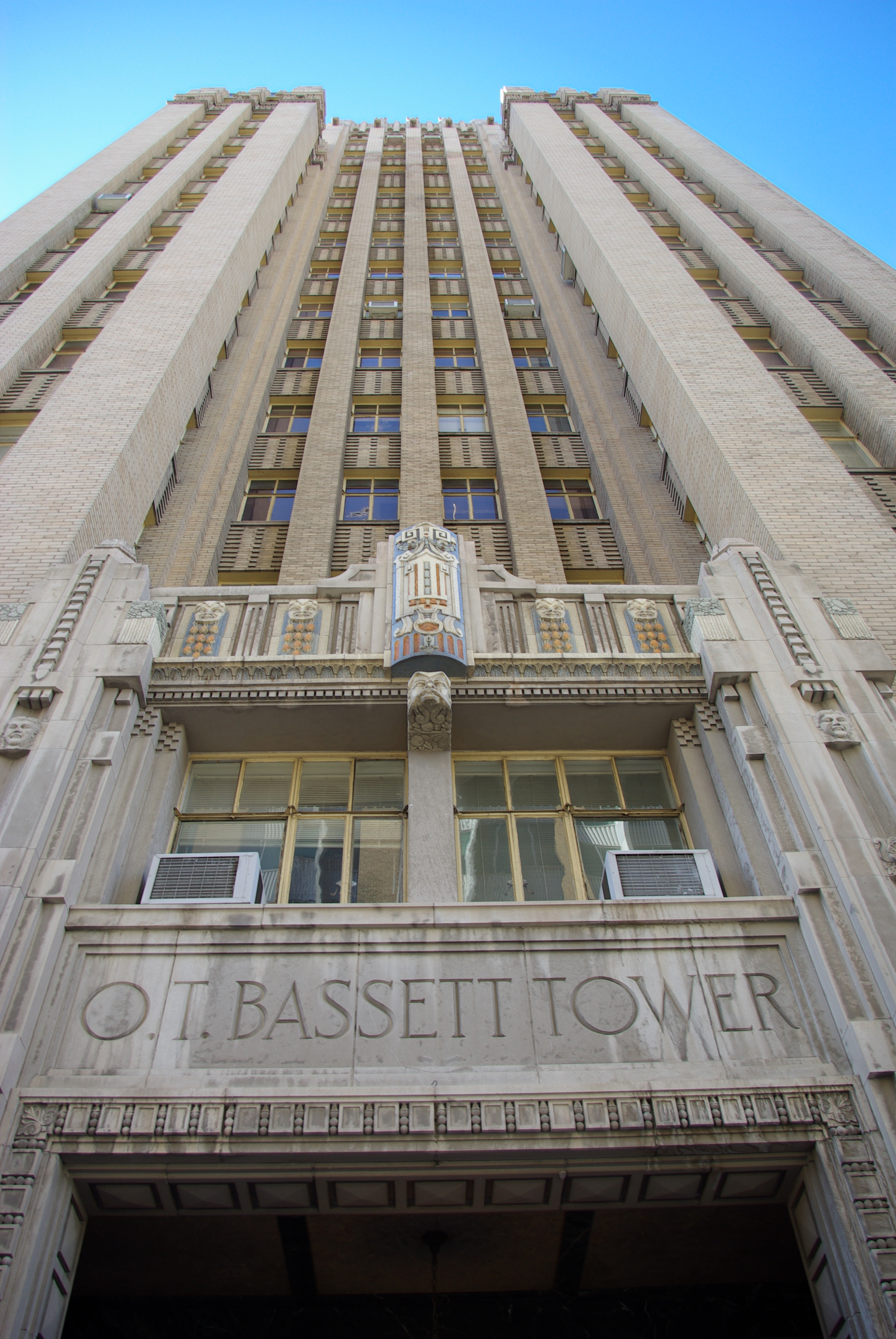
Front Facade

The O. T. Bassett Tower is an Art Deco skyscraper located at 303 Texas Avenue in Downtown El Paso, Texas. It was built by Charles N. Bassett, who named it in honor of his father. The tower was designed by Trost & Trost and completed in 1930, making it one of Henry Trost's last commissions. It was briefly the tallest building in the city but was surpassed later the same year by the Hilton Hotel. The Bassett Tower is 217 feet (66 m) tall and has 15 stories, with setbacks at the tenth and thirteenth floors. It is faced with tan brick veneer and adorned with stone and terra cotta decorative elements, including a sculpted face over the main entrance which is believed to be that of Trost himself.

The building was listed in the National Register of Historic Places in 1980.

== See also ==
- National Register of Historic Places listings in El Paso County, Texas

Preceded by Anson Mills Building	Tallest Building in El Paso; 1930; 114m	Succeeded by Plaza Hotel (El Paso)
