= Walter Douglas House =

- U.S. National Register of Historic Places
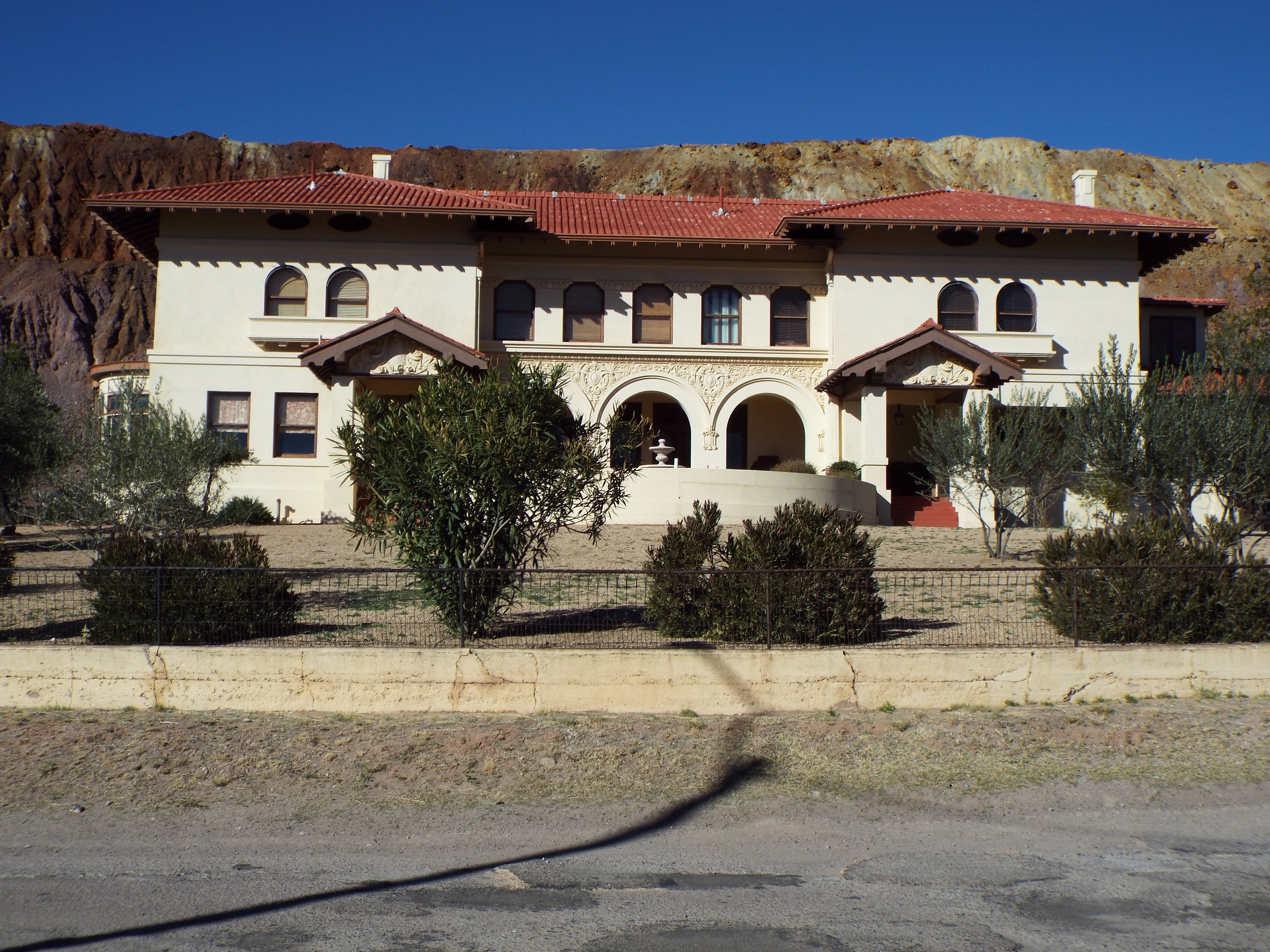
- The house in 2016

- Location within Arizona Location within the United States
- Location: 201 Cole Avenue, Bisbee, Arizona
- Coordinates: 31°25′05″N 109°52′37″W
- Area: 1.64 acres (0.66 ha)
- Built: 1908
- Architects: Trost & Trost
- NRHP reference No.: 00001125
- Added to NRHP: September 22, 2000

The Walter Douglas House, in Bisbee, Arizona, was built for Walter Douglas in 1908, who was the general manager for the Phelps-Dodge Company. It was the first house built in what was then Warren, Arizona, which was Arizona's first planned community, and was the largest home in the community. Designed by the architectural firm, Trost and Trost, it is a Crafts/Mission Revival Style house. The house has 11 bedrooms, a library, a billiards room, a basement, several school rooms, six fireplaces with Grueby tile, leaded-glass windowns and maple flooring. It also has three apartments (one of four rooms and two of six rooms); and 10,000 square feet (930 m^{2}) of patio space. Throughout the years, the house has served several different purposes. Initially it was a private residence for Douglas. Then it was carved into apartments and at one point served as a lodge. In the late 1900s it was renovated as a private residence once again.

== The house ==
The house is one of the largest and earliest homes made of cast-in concrete. Wall width varies from 14 to 18 inches, and are reinforced with steel. The house is just under 11,000 square feet, making it almost five times as large as the average house in Tucson. A wrought-iron surrounds the front and sides of the house, and two covered stairways are in the front (south side) of the house, rising to the house's veranda, which runs across its front. These stairways flank the main entrance, which looks out upon gardens and lily pond, as well as a courtyard with an L-shaped concrete pergola, and reflecting pool. The cast-place concrete structure has been covered with stucco plaster. The exterior walls have pre-formed Sullivanesque plaster tracery panels, and arched spandrels and plaster medallions. The pitched roof is covered with molding tin, crafted to look like mission tile. The walls decrease in thickness in each story, from 18 inches on the main floor down to 14 inches on the third-story. The east side of the house is dominated by a port cochere for a single vehicle. Stairs lead from port cochere up onto the veranda. The west side of the house has the kitchen entrance, entrance to the servants' quarters, and a basement entry. In the back of the house, the north side, there is a pergola over a rear patio with a central reflecting pool. In the 1930s an in-ground pool was added, as well as a jacuzzi.

== Interior ==
Including the basement, there are 42 rooms in the building, which includes 12 bedrooms, 10 bathrooms, billiards room, master bedroom suite, and servants' quarters. From the veranda, the main entrance consists of large double doors, flanked by windows. The foyer leads to a drawing room (or living room) to the left and the library to the right. The library has glass door bookcases and a fireplace with inlaid green tiles. The bookcases stop several fee below the ceiling. Leaded glass windows and doors have iron grills. Beyond the drawing room is the dining room, with a large bay window. Between each room are pocket double-doors. At the back of the foyer is a large semi-circular oak staircase leading to the second floor, with large leaded windows rising to the ceiling. To the right of the stairs are double doors with leaded glass windows lead to a center indoor patio. The patio has a pergola and fountain. The living room has a fireplace on the north wall, with leaded windows. Going through the living room leads to the dining, separated by large double pocket doors. It is a large dining room which could accommodate several dozen guests. There is a large bay window with a window seat. The kitchen lies off of the dining room, with a dumbwaiter to the upper floors. Beyond the kitchen are the servants' quarters. The interior maple floors are clear and unmarked.

At the top of the winding staircase on the second floor there is a large foyer, with hallways leading both to the east and west. There are several bedrooms off of the two hallways, some with an adjoining room, either for dressing or linen. Some of the bedrooms have their own fireplace. Down the east hallway, after passing several bedrooms, is the master bedroom suite. It has a private bathroom, as well as a private solarium, which was most likely a screened sleeping porch when the house was first built. Going down the west hallway, after several bedrooms are the classrooms, where the Douglas children were educated along with other selected children. These classrooms were not part of the original construction, but were added shortly after. There are several other bathrooms on the floor, as well as a large linen closet. Also on the second floor there is an apartment. The third floor is reached by a stairway off the foyer of the staircase leading to the ground floor. The billiards room is located here, with a wall of windows looking to the north. There is a full bathroom off of the billiards room. Another door off of the billiards room leads to a storage attic, which covers the remainder of the third floor, which includes a cedar closet for storing linen and clothing.

== Development and use ==
The house was designed by Henry Trost of the Trost and Trost architectural firm in El Paso, Texas. Trost had lived several years in southern Arizona before moving to Texas. He was commissioned to design and build the house in 1907, and had it finished on July 5, 1908, at the cost of $65,000. It is the largest residence ever built by Trost, who had been taught by Louis Sullivan, alongside Frank Lloyd Wright.

Over the years the house went through several owners and incarnations. The house was initially built by and owned by the Phelps-Dodge Corporation. Walter Douglas and his family owned the house from its construction through 1922. They lived their full-time until 1910, when Douglas was made president of the entire Phelps-Dodge Corporation, and the family moved their residence to New York City. However, they maintained the house in Douglas as a summer residence. In 1922, P. O. Becket, the general manager of the Copper Queen Mine occupied the house until 1929, when Colonel Hartzen and his family, who succeeded Becket as the G. M. at the Copper Queen, began living there, and remained until 1941. Phelps-Dodge sold the residence in 1941 to Frank Cunningham, who divided the house into apartments to house people working at nearby military bases during World War II. It remained an apartment building through a sequence of owners until it was sold to Marc McIntyre in 1976, who converted it back into an individual residence. A process which was continued by subsequent owners.
