= Hotel Paso del Norte =

Hotel in Texas, United States

- U.S. National Register of Historic Places
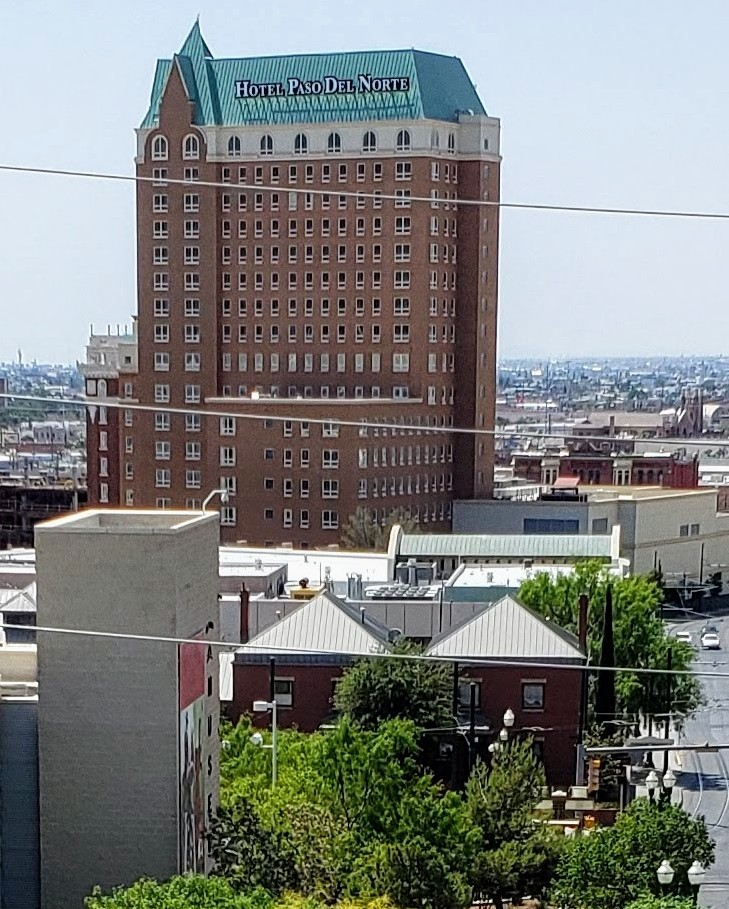
- Hotel Paso del Norte, 2019

- Location within Texas Location within the United States
- Location: 10 Henry Trost Court; El Paso, Texas
- Coordinates: 31°53′20″N 106°34′15″W
- Area: less than one acre
- Built: 1912
- Built by: J.E. Lewis
- Architect: Trost & Trost
- Architectural style: Chicago, Beaux Arts
- MPS: Commercial Structures of El Paso by Henry C. Trost TR
- NRHP reference No.: 79002933
- Added to NRHP: January 5, 1979

Hotel Paso del Norte is a historic 351-room hotel. It is located in El Paso, Texas, less than one mile north of the international border with Mexico. The hotel originally opened on Thanksgiving Day 1912, and was designed by Trost & Trost. The building was added to the National Register of Historic Places on January 5, 1979. In 2018, it closed temporarily and underwent a substantial renovation/restoration, reopening its doors as part of Marriott's Autograph Collection on October 8, 2020.

A wealthy El Paso businessman, Zack T. White, financed initial construction of the hotel. After witnessing a fire destroy another hotel in El Paso, White and architect Henry Charles Trost traveled to San Francisco, California to try to understand how some buildings there survived the earthquake and fire in 1906. The hotel cost $1.5 million to build in order to make it one of the sturdiest structures in El Paso and the most ornate. The large hotel lobby features a stained glass dome over forty-five feet in diameter designed in the Tiffany glass style.

During the 1914 Mexican Revolution, it was popular to watch firefights between the revolutionaries and the Mexican Army from the terraces on the roof of the hotel. Some of the most notable people who have stayed at the hotel over its 100+ year history include U.S. Presidents George H. W. Bush, George W. Bush, Lyndon Johnson, Richard Nixon, William Howard Taft, Herbert Hoover, and Franklin Delano Roosevelt. Other notables include Gloria Swanson, General John J. "Black Jack" Pershing, Pancho Villa, Will Rogers, Enrico Caruso, Amelia Earhart, Sandra Day O’Connor, Gregory Peck, Harrison Ford, Colin Powell, Charles Lindbergh, Clark Gable, John Wayne, Jack Dempsey, U2, Van Halen, Aerosmith, Peter Frampton, The Grateful Dead, Pink Floyd, Phish, The Rolling Stones, Dallas Cowboys, Golden State Warriors, George Strait, Kenny Rogers, Gloria Estefan, and a host of other well-known actors, musicians, celebrities, and government officials.

The hotel was sold several times during the 20th century. In 1986, a 17-story addition was constructed on the north side of the hotel. The Mexican hotel group Camino Real Hotels, who operated it as The Camino Real for 30 years, sold the building to The Meyers Group in October 2016.

The Meyers Group renovated the historically renamed Hotel Paso Del Norte with local El Paso development partner Two Sabes LLC.

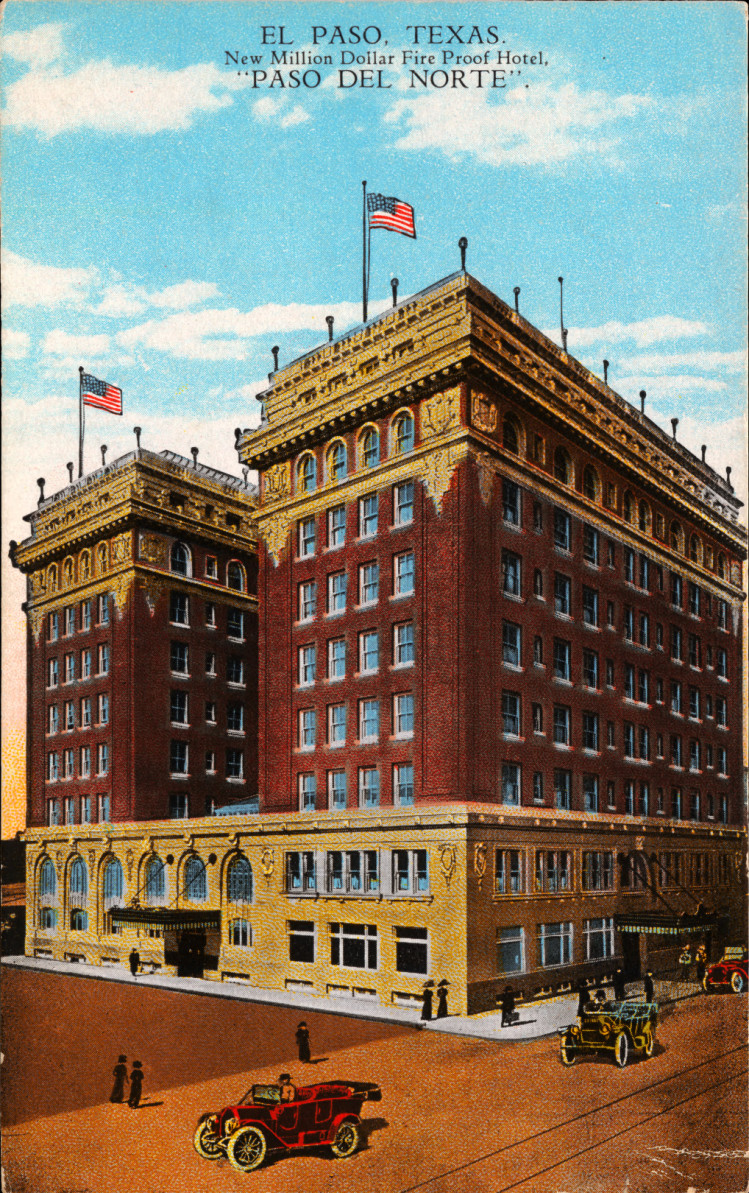
Paso Del Norte, El Paso, Texas (postcard, c. 1913)

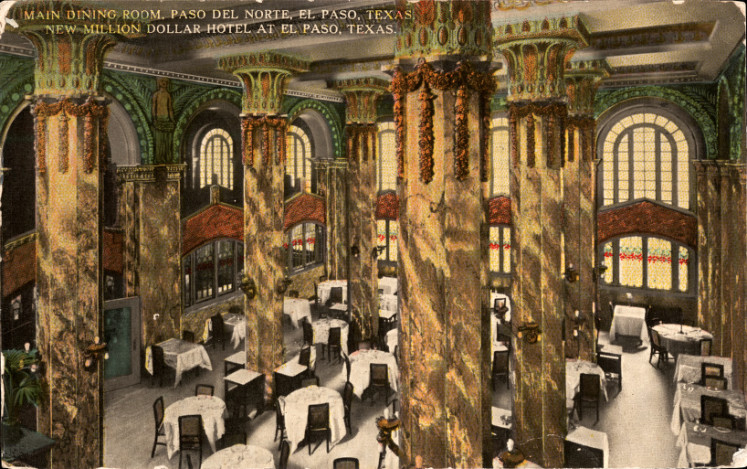
Main Dining Room, Hotel Paso Del Norte (postcard, c. 1913)

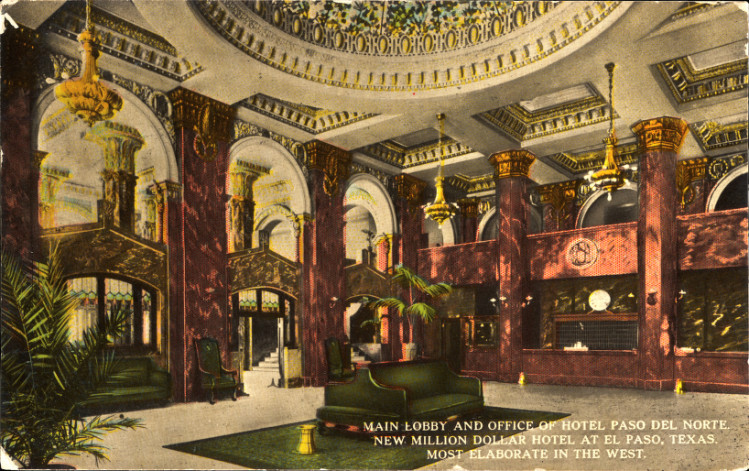
Main Lobby and Office, Hotel Paso Del Norte, El Paso, Texas (postcard, c. 1913)

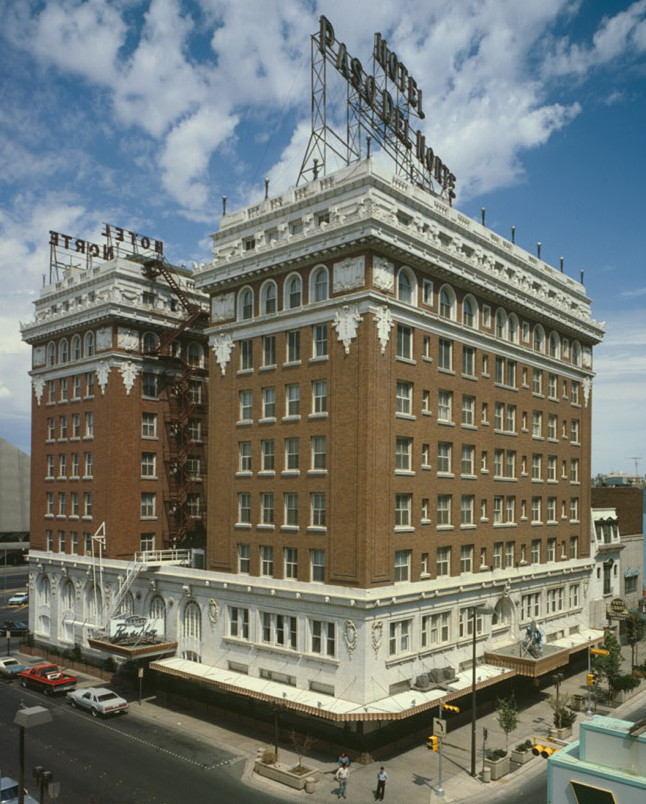
Hotel Paso del Norte, circa 1970s

== See also ==
- National Register of Historic Places listings in El Paso County, Texas
