= Luhrs Tower =

Art Deco building in Phoenix, Arizona

Coordinates: 33.4469°N 112.0748°W

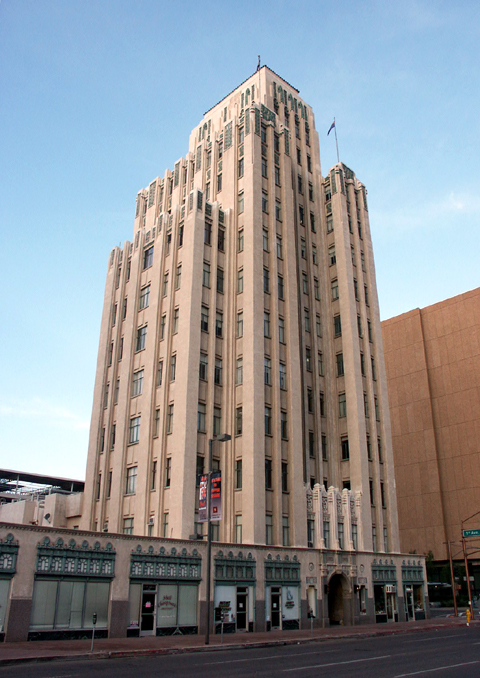
- Art Deco style Luhrs Tower in Phoenix, Arizona.

General information
- Architectural style: Art Deco
- Location: Phoenix, Arizona
- Address: 45 West Jefferson Street
- Groundbreaking: March 25, 1929
- Completed: December 1929
- Cost: $400,000
- Height: 185 ft (56 m)

Technical details
- Floor count: 14
- Lifts/elevators: 2

Design and construction
- Architect(s): Trost & Trost
- Developer: George Luhrs Jr.
- Main contractor: A. F. Wasielewski Company

Luhrs Tower is an Art Deco skyscraper office building in Downtown Phoenix, Arizona. It is located at the southeast corner of First Avenue and Jefferson Street, on the south side of the former Patriots Square Park.

== Architecture ==
The building was built in 1929 by George Luhrs Jr., a prominent local Phoenix native, Stanford Law School graduate, World War I US Army 2nd Lt., businessman, and son of George Luhrs Sr., Phoenix City Councilman from 1881 to 1885. The tower reaches a height of 185 ft (56 m). Luhrs Tower has 14 stories, with symmetrical setbacks at the 8th and 11th floors.

Luhrs Tower was designed in the Art Deco style by the architectural firm of Trost & Trost in El Paso, Texas. It bears a considerable resemblance to the firm's O. T. Bassett Tower located in El Paso. The design also features several elements of Eliel Saarinen's Tribune Tower design. A. F. Wasielewski Company of Phoenix was the general contractor.

== Popular culture ==
The Luhrs Tower appeared in the background of a scene from the 1960 film Psycho in which the character Marion Crane (played by Janet Leigh) crossed the street with the deposit she was supposed to make for her boss.

== See also ==
- Luhrs Building – built in 1924, adjacent to the Luhrs Tower.
- Art Deco architecture in Arizona
- Phoenix Historic Property Register
- List of historic properties in Phoenix

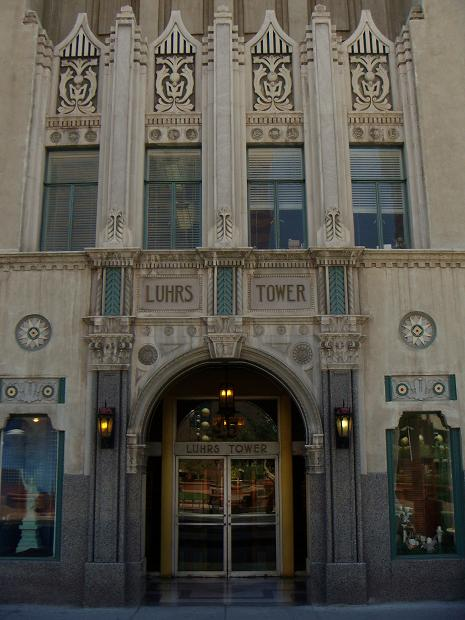
Luhrs Tower entry facade.
