= Edward DeGroff =

- Born: 1860; Richmond County, New York, U.S.
- Died: 1910 (aged 49–50); Sitka, Alaska, U.S.
- Occupation: Photographer

Edward DeGroff (1860 – April 1910) was a Sitka merchant and a noted photographer who contributed to the historical record of Sitka, Alaska in the late 19th century. Born in Staten Island, he arrived in the coastal town of Sitka, Alaska in 1880.

== Life and career ==
=== Career with the Northwest Trading Company ===
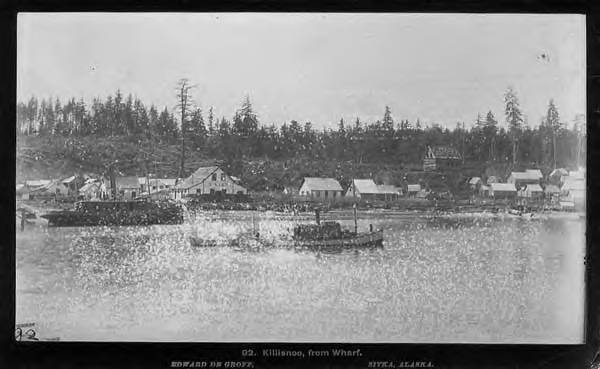
Northwest Trading Company

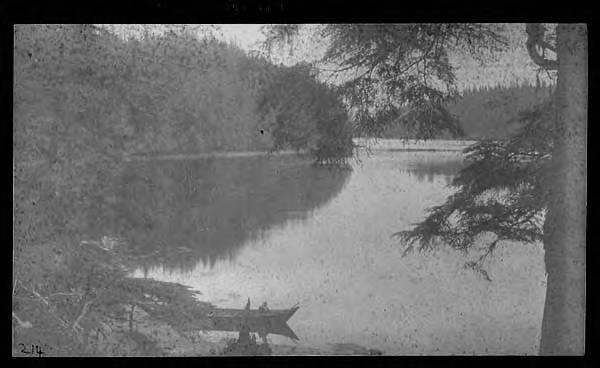
Photograph by Edward DeGroff

DeGroff began his career with the Northwest Trading Company at Killisnoo. He stayed there only briefly before moving on to the then-new town of Harrisburg (now state capital Juneau) to manage operations of the company store based there. He went on to become the town's first postmaster and deputy recorder of the Harris Mining District. DeGroff returned to Killisnoo in 1882 to act as the store's manager. Not all was well with the operations of the company, however. He wrote in a bitter letter in 1885 of the Northwest Trading Company's primary operator Paul Schulze:

"Schulze fairly cursed the country this time when the Steamer came up. Said he had lost his own and his Friends money in it. I wonder if any of those egotistical chaps ever think that a great many of their misfortunes are their own fault – they are careful not to tell anyone if they do."

=== Later life ===
By January 1886, had purchased the Northwest Trading Company store in Sitka, which he ran with his partner Captain John M. Vanderbilt (for whom Vanderbilt Reef is named). It was in this year that DeGroff began photographing the buildings and people of the island, a hobby which quickly became profitable as he sold prints of his photos at his store until 1890. Upon Vanderbilt's death in 1890, DeGroff married his business partner's widow.

In 1905, DeGroff grubstaked two Tlingit natives who discovered gold at Chichagoff Island, and thereafter became one of the principal stakeholders in the Chichagoff Mine, presiding as president of the Chichagoff Gold Mining Company. In addition to this title, DeGroff also went to Chicago in 1893 as Commissioner for Alaska to the Columbian Exposition and in 1900 he was appointed as U.S. Commissioner in Sitka. He died at Sitka in 1910.
