= Luhrs Building =

Historic building in Arizona

Coordinates: 33.4469°N 112.0741°W

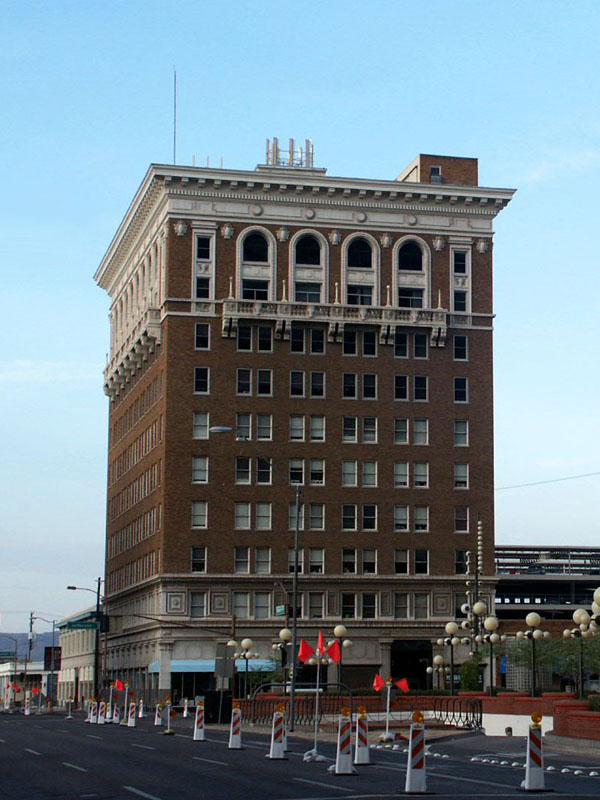
- Luhrs Building, 2006
- Interactive map of the Luhrs Building area

General information
- Architectural style: Beaux-Arts
- Location: Phoenix, Arizona, 11 West Jefferson Street
- Groundbreaking: 1923
- Completed: May 14, 1924
- Cost: $553,000

Height
- Height: 136 ft (41 m)

Technical details
- Floor count: 10
- Lifts/elevators: 3

Design and construction
- Architect: Trost & Trost
- Developer: George H. N. Luhrs
- Main contractor: Jay J. Garfield

The Moxy Phoenix Downtown is a hotel located in the Luhrs Building, a historic ten-story office building located at 11 West Jefferson in Downtown Phoenix, Arizona. It was listed on the Phoenix Historic Property Register in 1990, and on the National Register of Historic Places in 2024. It was built by local businessman George H. N. Luhrs, an original Phoenix City Council member from 1881–85, at a cost of US$553,000, and opened on May 17, 1924. At the time, it was the tallest building in Phoenix and was said to be the largest building between El Paso and Los Angeles. In 2009, the building was renovated with the help of a $500,000 historic preservation grant.

On May 30, 2014, Bitter & Twisted Cocktail Parlour, an award winning cocktail lounge, opened on the ground floor of the building.

On December 29, 2023, the Moxy Phoenix Downtown hotel opened in the converted and restored structure.

== Architecture ==
The L-shaped Luhrs Building was designed in the Beaux-Arts style by the El Paso architectural firm of Trost & Trost. The building is faced with brown brick, with elaborate marble ornamentation on the uppermost two floors, and a heavy cornice at the top. Jay J. Garfield, a well known local builder was the contractor for the building.

The building's ground floor was leased by the US Treasury Dept. from 1924–1935. The 7th–10th floors were the original location of the Arizona Club, including dining rooms, lounges, a library, and bedrooms for club members. When the Arizona Club moved out of the Luhrs Building in 1971, the upper floors were also converted to office floor space. The 6th floor was originally occupied by Standard Oil.

== See also ==
- Luhrs Tower – built in 1929, adjacent to the Luhrs Building.
- List of historic properties in Phoenix
- Phoenix Historic Property Register

Preceded by Arizona State Capitol	Tallest Building in Phoenix; 1924—1927; 42m	Succeeded by Westward Ho
