= Anson Mills Building =

- Mills Building
- U.S. National Register of Historic Places
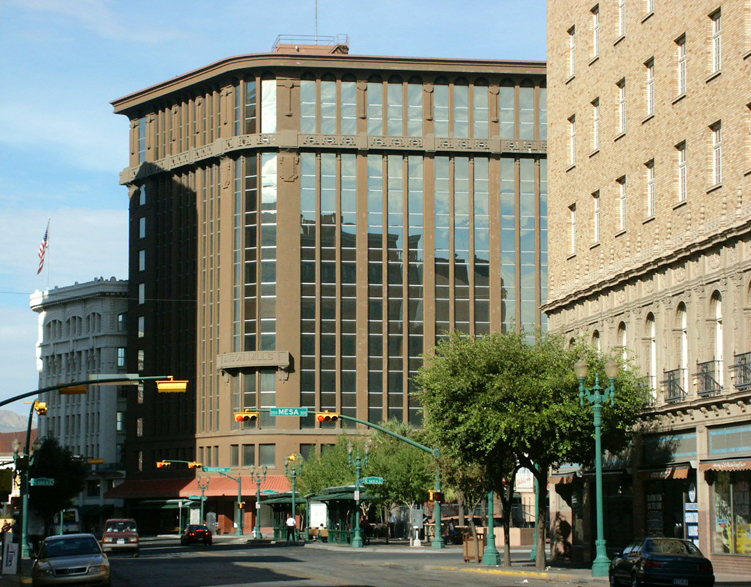
- Mills Building

- Location within Texas Location within the United States
- Location: 303 N. Oregon St., El Paso
- Coordinates: 31°45′33″N 106°29′21″W
- Built: 1911
- Architect: Henry C. Trost
- Architectural style: Early Commercial
- NRHP reference No.: 11000130
- Added to NRHP: March 21, 2011

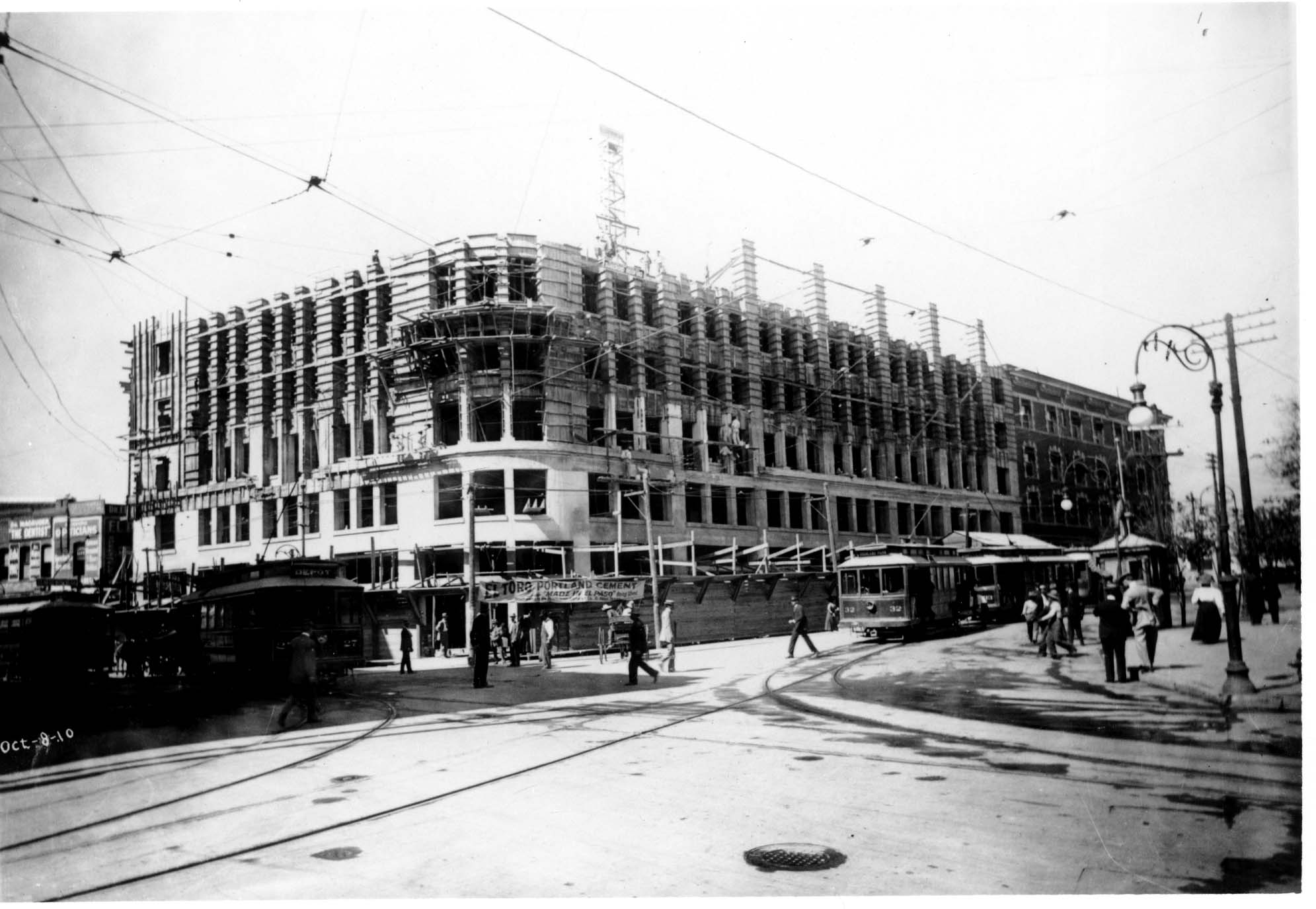
Mills Building under construction in 1910

The Anson Mills Building is a historic building located at 303 North Oregon Street in El Paso, Texas. The building stands on the original site of the 1832 Ponce de León ranch. Anson Mills hired Henry C. Trost of the Trost and Trost architectural firm to design and construct the building. Trost was the area's foremost pioneer in the use of reinforced concrete. Built in 1910–1911, the building was only the second concrete-frame skyscraper in the United States, and one of the largest all-concrete buildings. At 145 feet (44 m), the 12-story Mills Building was the tallest building in El Paso when completed. The architectural firm of Trost and Trost moved its offices to the building upon completion, where they remained until 1920. The Mills family sold the building in 1965. The building stands on a corner site opposite San Jacinto Plaza, with a gracefully curved street facade that wraps around the south and east sides. Like many of Trost's designs, the Anson Mills Building's overall form and strong verticality, as well as details of the ornamentation and cornice, are reminiscent of the Chicago School work of Louis Sullivan.

In 1974, the Mills Building's windows were replaced with vertical bands of mirrored glass, radically altering its appearance.

The Mills Building was designated as a Texas Historic Civil Engineering Landmark by the American Society of Civil Engineers in 1981.

== See also ==
- National Register of Historic Places listings in El Paso County, Texas

Preceded by Unknown	Tallest Building in El Paso; 1911—1930; 44m	Succeeded by Bassett Tower
