= Trost & Trost =

Architectural firm based in El Paso, Texas

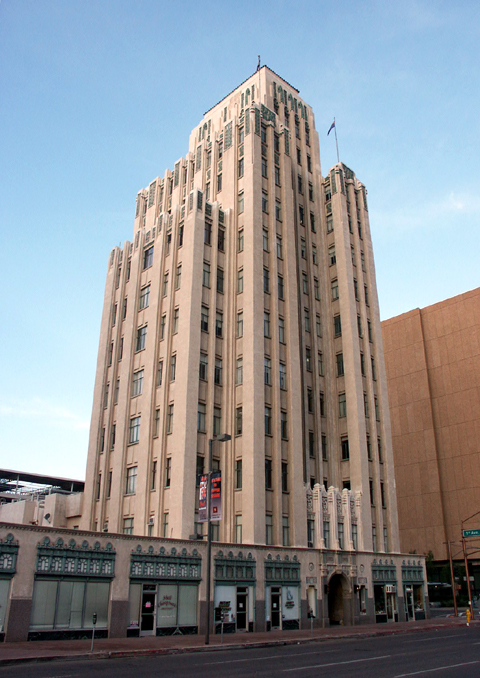
Luhrs Tower in Phoenix (built 1929)

Trost & Trost Architects & Engineers, often known as Trost & Trost, was an architectural firm based in El Paso, Texas. The firm's chief designer was Henry Charles Trost, who was born in Toledo, Ohio, in 1860. Trost moved from Chicago to Tucson, Arizona in 1899 and to El Paso in 1903. He partnered with Robert Rust to form Trost & Rust. Rust died in 1905 and later that year Trost formed the firm of Trost & Trost with his twin brother Gustavus Adolphus Trost, also an architect, who had joined the firm as a structural engineer. Between 1903 and Henry Trost's death on September 19, 1933, the firm designed hundreds of buildings in the El Paso area and in other Southwestern cities, including Albuquerque, Phoenix, Tucson, and San Angelo.

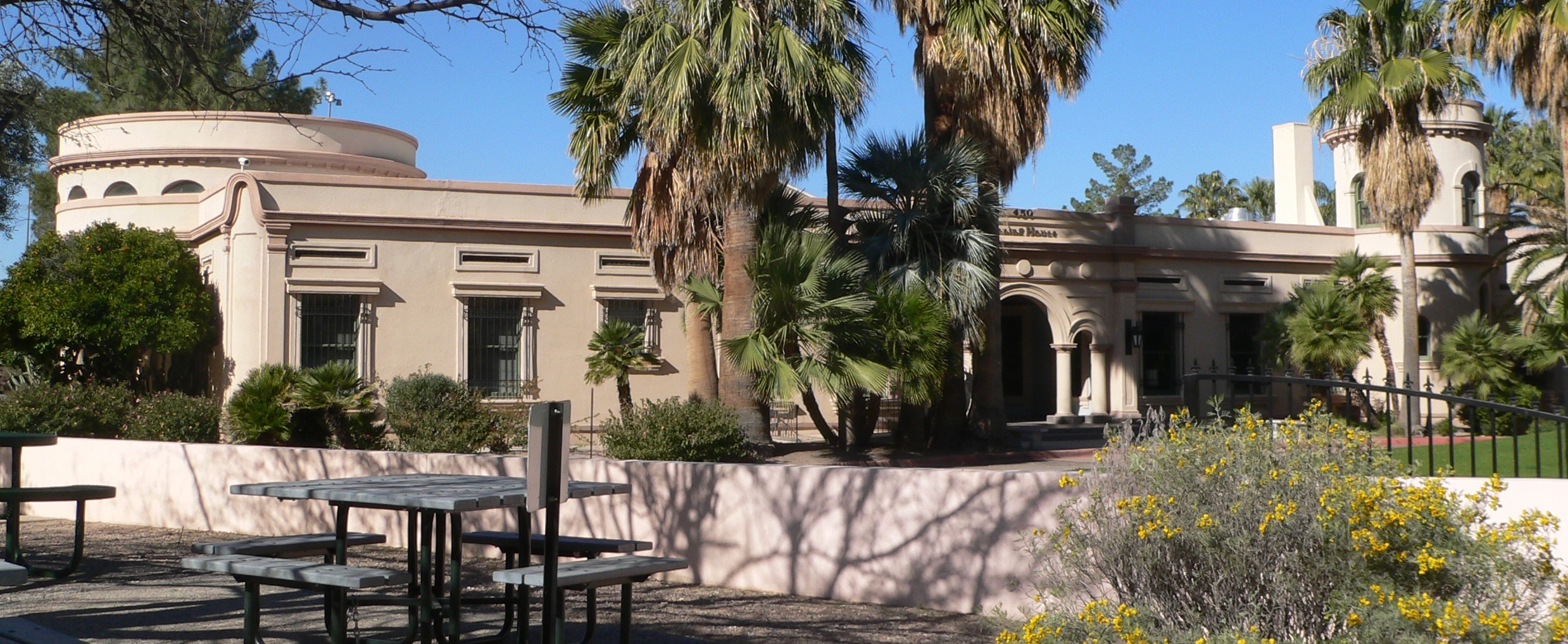
Manning House in Tucson designed by Henry Trost

Throughout his career, Henry Trost demonstrated his ability to work in a variety of styles, including Art Deco, Mission Revival, Prairie, Pueblo Revival, and Bhutanese Dzong architecture, at the University of Texas at El Paso. Many of the buildings designed by Trost & Trost display an influence from the Chicago School of architecture. Henry Trost had lived in Chicago between 1888 and 1896. In 1889, Henry started the American Art Metal Work Company with Emil Henry Seeman, which lasted about a year.

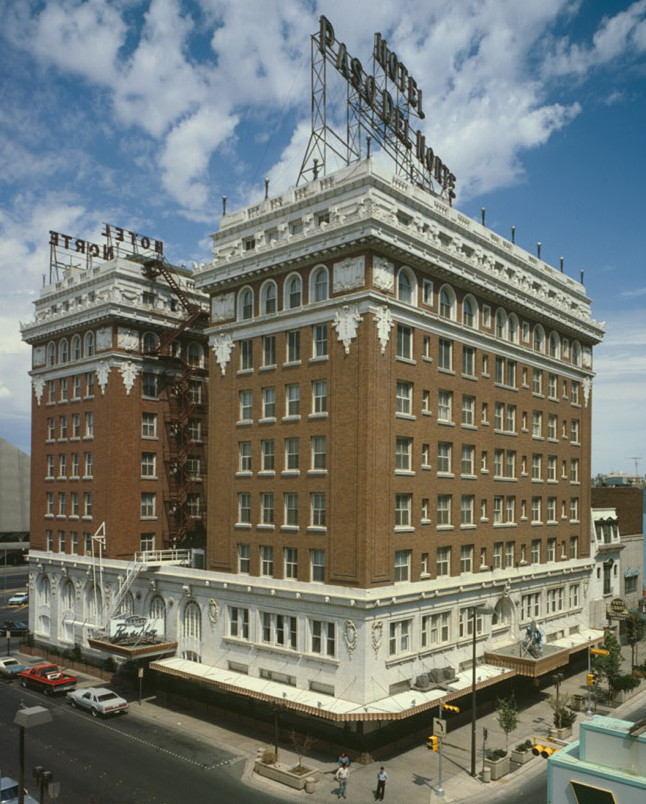
Hotel Paso del Norte in El Paso

From 1892 to 1896, Trost served as vice president of Chicago Ornamental Iron Company. The company is associated with metal ornament that formed the front railings of the boxes and balconies in the Lafayette Square Opera House in Washington, DC.

== Selected buildings ==
- Steinfeld Mansion (Tucson's First Owls Club), 1898 Tucson, Arizona; Henry C. Trost
- South Hall, 1898, University of Arizona, Tucson, Arizona; Henry C. Trost (demolished 1958)
- Schneider-Healy House, 1900–1902, Tucson, Arizona; Henry Trost
- Gardiner / Ramsey House 1900–1901, 144 E. University Blvd. Tucson, Arizona Trost & Trost
- Tucson's Second Owls Club, 1902-1903 Tucson, Arizona; Trost & Rust
- Carnegie Free Library in Tucson, 1900-1901 Arizona; Trost & Trost
- Willard Hotel (Pueblo Hotel and Apartments), 1902–1904, 145 S.6th Ave. Tucson, Arizona; Henry C. Trost
- Santa Rita Hotel, 1904, Tucson, Arizona Trost & Rust (demolished 1972)
- Ronstadt House, 1904, 607 North Sixth Avenue in Tucson, Arizona; Trost & Rust
- Bayless House, 1905, 145 East University Boulevard Tucson, Arizona; Trost & Rust
- Tucson Residence (721 E. University Blvd.), 1905, Tucson, Arizona; Henry C. Trost
- William Ward Turney residence (now the International Museum of Art), 1908, El Paso, Texas
- Young Men's Christian Association, 1906–1908; El Paso, Texas, Henry C. Trost (demolished in 1961)
- Manning House 1907 for Levi Manning at 450 W. Paseo Redondo in Tucson designed by Henry Trost

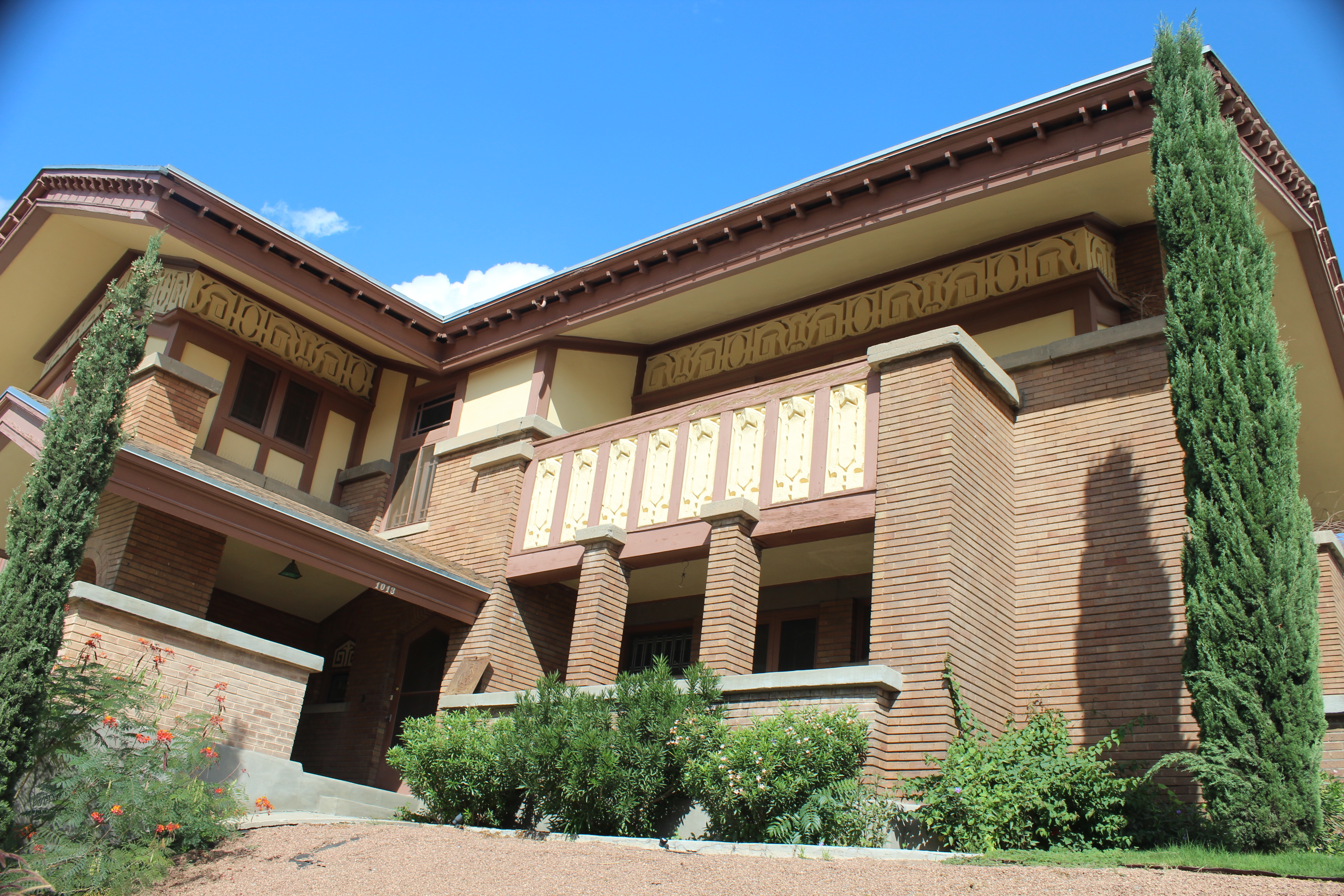
Henry C. Trost residence in El Paso

- Henry C. Trost residence, 1908, 1013 W. Yandell Dr. El Paso, Texas; Henry C. Trost

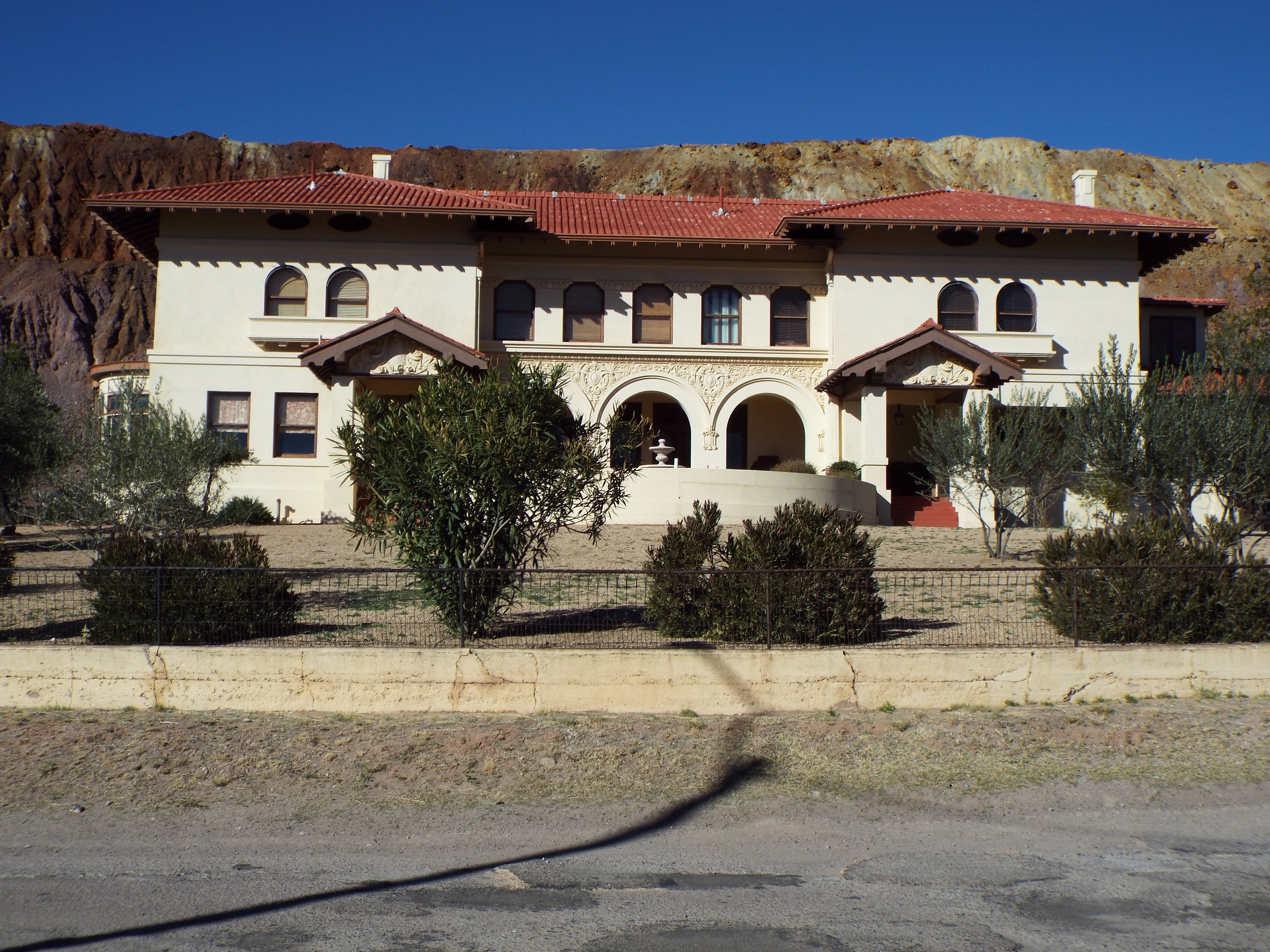
Walter Douglas house

- Walter Douglas House, 1908, Bisbee, Arizona; Trost & Trost
- Goodrich House, 1908, Tucson, Arizona; Henry C. Trost
- El Paso Country Club, 1908–1909, El Paso, Texas, Henry C. Trost (destroyed by fire in 1916)
- Caples Building, 1909, El Paso, Texas. Empty in 2015.
- New Mexico State University campus, 1909, Las Cruces, New Mexico
- Abdou Building, 1910, at 115 North Mesa Street at Texas Avenue in El Paso, Texas

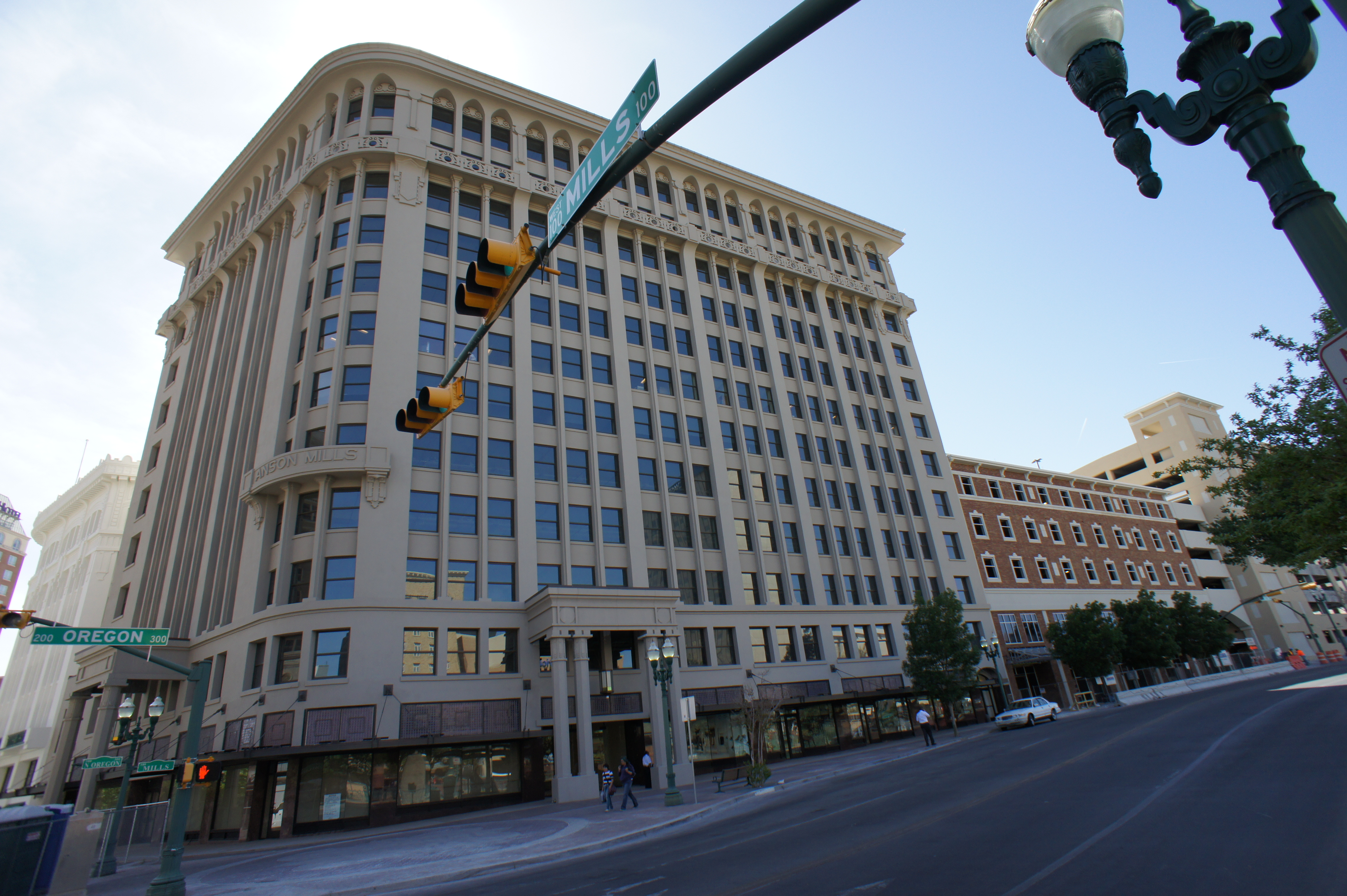
Anson Mills Building in El Paso, Texas 2011

- Anson Mills Building, 1911, El Paso, Texas
- Kerr Mercantile Building, 1927, Sanderson, Texas; Henry C. Trost
- Hotel Paso del Norte, 1912, El Paso, Texas; Henry C. Trost
- Popular Department Store (now 1 Union Fashion Center), 1912, El Paso, Texas
- White House Department Store (now The Centre), 1912, El Paso, Texas
- El Paso High School, 1913–1916, El Paso, Texas; Henry C. Trost
- Scottish Rite Cathedral, 1915; Tucson, Arizona; Trost & Trost
- El Paso Country Court House, 1915–1916, El Paso, Texas; Henry C. Trost (demolished in 1988)
- Arizona Eastern & Southern Pacific Railway Passenger Station, Globe, Arizona, 1916
- Occidental Life Building, 1917, Albuquerque, New Mexico
- Old Main Building at the University of Texas at El Paso, 1917, El Paso, Texas; Henry C. Trost
- Quinn Hall at the University of Texas at El Paso, 1917, El Paso, Texas; Henry C. Trost
- Graham Hall at the University of Texas at El Paso, 1917, El Paso, Texas; Henry C. Trost
- Geology Building at the University of Texas at El Paso, 1917
- Rosenwald Building, 1920, downtown Albuquerque, New Mexico
- Kelly Hall at the University of Texas at El Paso- Kelly Hall, 1920–1921, El Paso, Texas; Henry C. Trost
- First National Bank Building, 1922, Albuquerque, New Mexico
- Houston High School, 1922, El Paso, Texas; Henry C. Trost
- State National Building, 1922, El Paso, Texas; Henry C. Trost
- Hotel Cortez - Hotel Orndorff, 1922, El Paso, Texas; Henry C. Trost
- Loretto Academy, 1922–1936, El Paso, Texas; Gustavus A. Trost

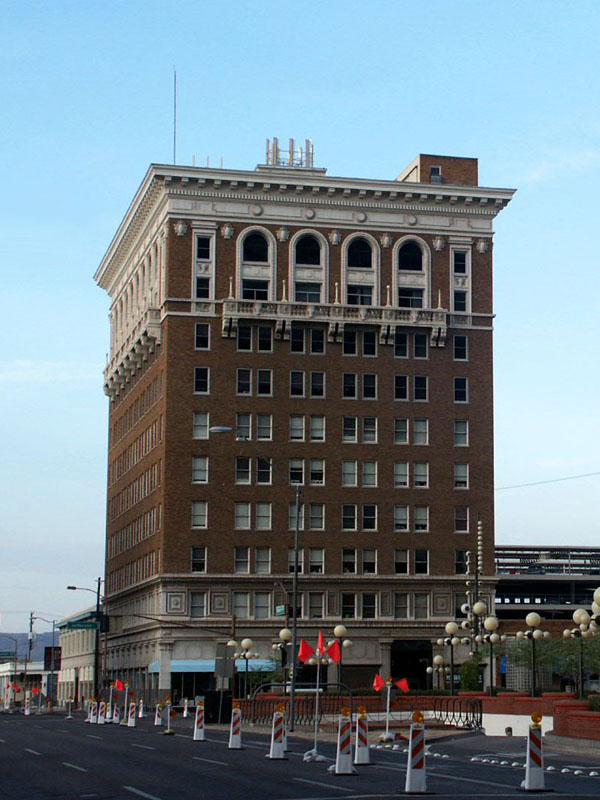
Luhrs Building in downtown Phoenix

- Luhrs Building, 1924, Phoenix, Arizona; Henry C. Trost
- Sunshine Building 1924 in Downtown Albuquerque, New Mexico
- El Paso Community College, 1925, El Paso, Texas; Henry C. Trost
- Hassayampa Inn, 1927, Prescott, Arizona; Trost & Trost
- Gage Hotel, 1927, Marathon, Texas
- The Holland Hotel, 1928, Alpine, Texas

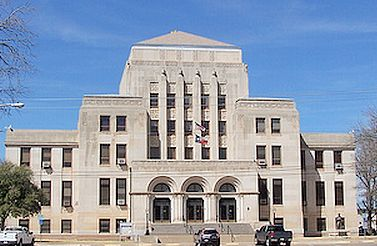
San Angelo City Hall

- San Angelo City Hall & Auditorium, 1929, San Angelo, Texas
- Gadsden Hotel, 1929, Douglas, Arizona
- Luhrs Tower, 1929, Phoenix, Arizona; Henry C. Trost
- Hotel Paisano, 1930, Marfa, Texas - Built by Charles Bassett: Gateway hotel chain
- Plaza Hotel - Plaza Motor Hotel, New Sheldon Hotel, Hilton Hotel amongst other names, 1929, El Paso, Texas; Henry C. Trost
- O. T. Bassett Tower, 1930, El Paso, Texas; Henry C. Trost
- Driskill Hotel, 1930 tower addition, Austin, Texas; Henry C. Trost
- University of Texas at El Paso- Worrell Hall, 1935–1937, El Paso, Texas; Gustavus A. Trost
- University of Texas at El Paso- Benedict, 1935–1937, El Paso, Texas; Gustavus A. Trost
- El Paso Country Club repairs (proposed 1920–1922), 1936, El Paso, Texas; Gustavus A. Trost
- University of Texas at El Paso- Holliday Hall, 1933, El Paso, Texas; Gustavus A. Trost

== References and notes ==
- Edgell, G.H., The American Architecture of Today Charles Scribner's Sons, New York. 1929
- Guide to the Architecture of Phoenix, Central Chapter of the American Institute of Architects. 1983
- Information gathered by Lloyd C. & June F. Engelbrecht under a grant from the National Endowment for the humanities for the El Paso Public Library, 1990.
- The Spirit of H.H. Richardson of the Midwest Prairies, ed. by Larson and Brown, University Art Museum, University of Minnesota, Iowa State University Press, Ames, IA, 1988
- A Photographic History of the University of Arizona 1885-1985 Phyllis Ball. Privately Printed. 1986
