= Downtown El Paso =

Central business district of El Paso, Texas

Coordinates: 31.7575°N 106.4950°W

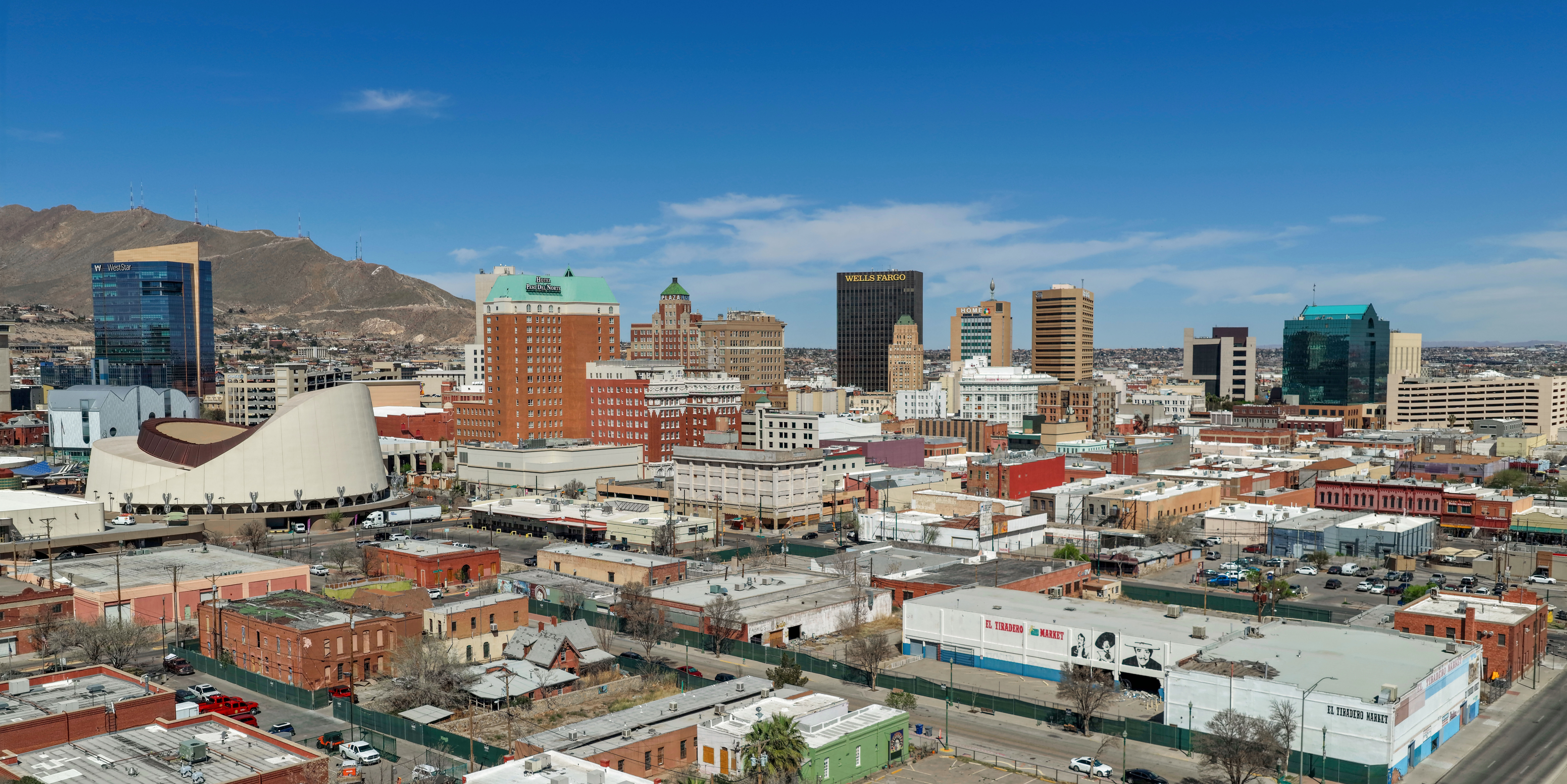
Skyline of Downtown El Paso

Downtown El Paso is the central business district of El Paso, Texas.

== Historical downtown ==
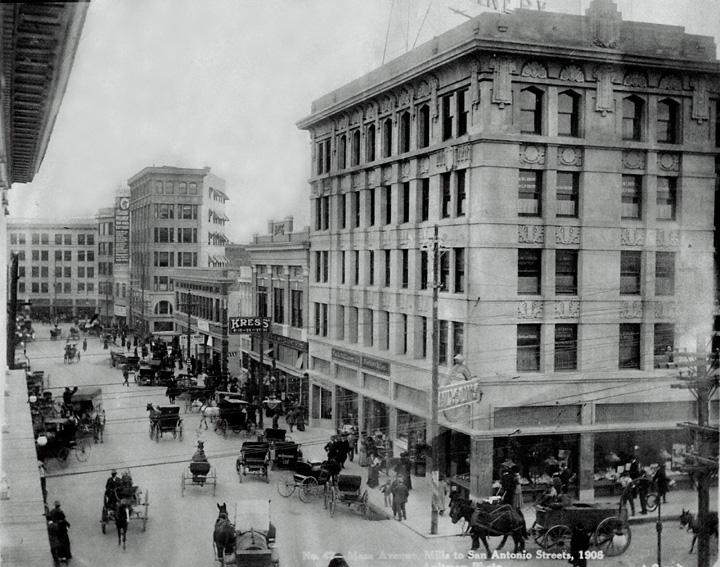
Downtown in 1908

James Day, an El Paso historian, said that downtown's main business area was originally centered between Second Street and San Francisco Street. At a later point, the main business area was centered on Stanton Street and Santa Fe. In the late 1800s, most white American residents lived directly to the north of the nonwhites in brick residences along Magoffin, Myrtle, and San Antonio streets. Hispanic American residents lived in an area called Chihuahuita ("little Chihuahua"), which was located south of Santa Fe and west of Second.

Several African Americans and around 300 Chinese Americans also lived in Chihuahuita. Many of the Chinese Americans built railroads in the El Paso area. El Segundo Barrio is another historic neighborhood in the downtown area.

== Government and infrastructure ==
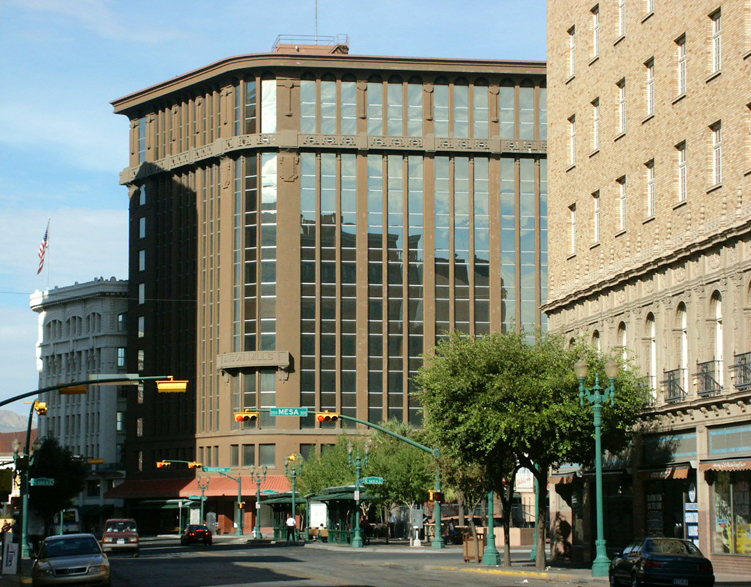
Anson Mills Building

The Texas Eighth Court of Appeals is located in downtown El Paso. The United States District Court for the Western District of Texas, sitting in El Paso, is located in downtown. The years 2011–2012 mark the first survey–census ever conducted for Downtown El Paso, which identified key demographics and now benchmarks to move downtown revitalization forward.

The key census type information targeted employers, employees, and households in the downtown area about who eats, shops, and plays in downtown El Paso. This information was shared with entrepreneurs and companies evaluating business investment opportunities in the downtown area and property owners seeking new tenants to better target their marketing, recruitment and outreach efforts. Downtown El Paso is part of District 8. Currently, the district is represented by Cissy Lizarraga.

== Education ==
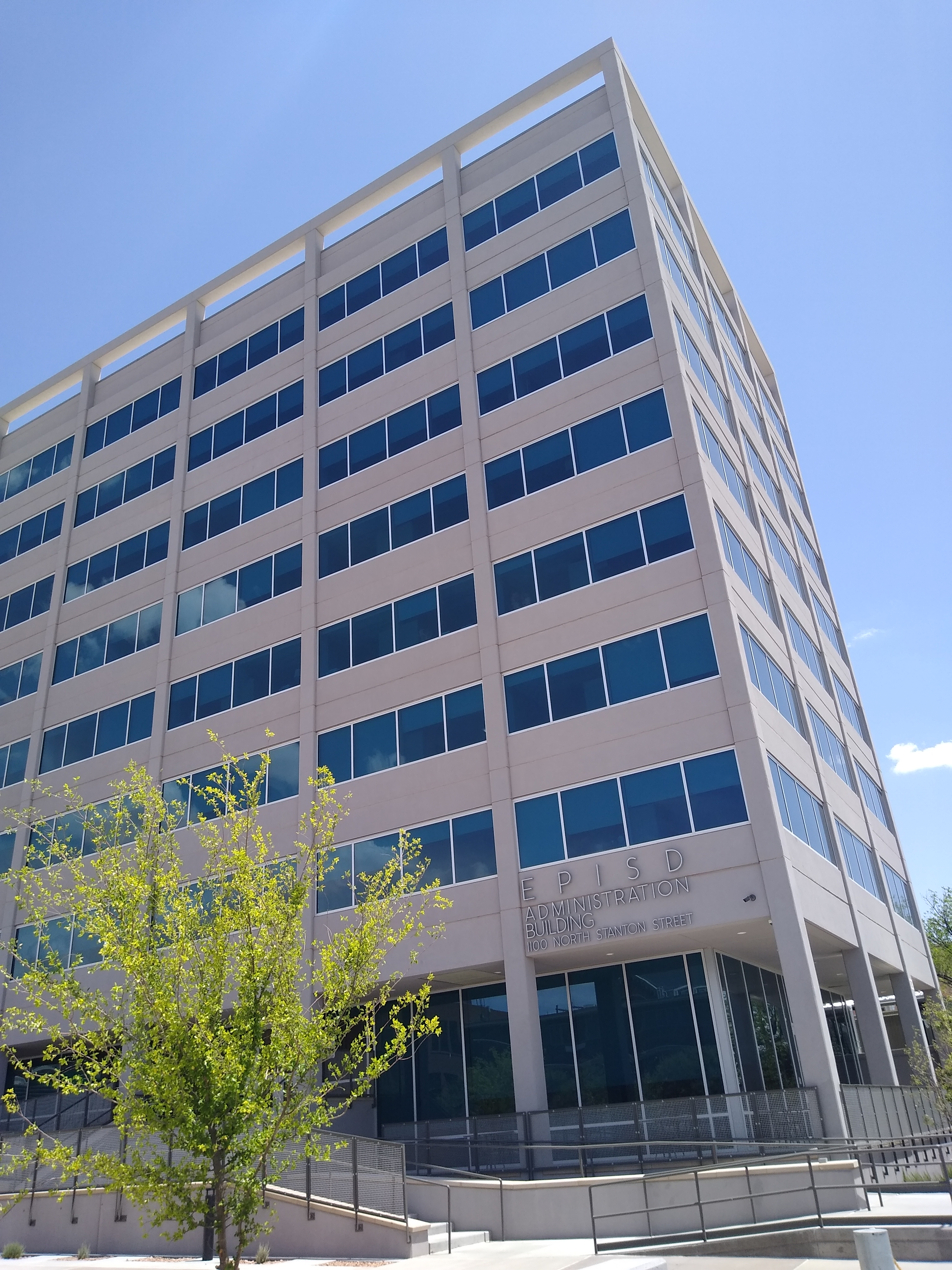
EPISD headquarters

El Paso Independent School District provides K-12 educational services. It has its headquarters in Downtown, moving there in 2021. The headquarters were previously on the grounds of El Paso International Airport.

El Paso Public Library operates the Main Library in Downtown.

== Diplomatic missions ==
The Consulate-General of Mexico in El Paso is located in downtown.

== Geography ==
See Also: History of Chinese American in Texas
