= National Register of Historic Places listings in the Upper Rio Grande region of Texas =

This is a list of the National Register of Historic Places listings in Texas' Upper Rio Grande.

The Upper Rio Grande region is an area of six counties defined by the Texas Comptroller for economic reporting in 2022, as mapped here. The region included 2020 population of nearly 890,000, or three percent of the state’s total population, with El Paso County having 97.4 percent of the Upper Rio Grande's population.

The six county area has 0 places listed on the National Register.

To see all locations together in a map, click on "Map all coordinates using OpenSourceMap" at right.

Brewster

	Name on the Register	Image	Date listed	Location	City or town	Description
1	Brewster County Courthouse and Jail	Brewster County Courthouse and Jail	July 17, 1978 (#78002899)	Courthouse Sq. 30°21′30″N 103°39′48″W	Alpine	State Antiquities Landmark; Recorded Texas Historic Landmark
2	Burro Mesa Archeological District	Burro Mesa Archeological District	September 11, 1985 (#85002309)	Address restricted	Panther Junction	
3	Castolon Historic District	Castolon Historic District	September 6, 1974 (#74000276)	Along Rio Grande at jct. of Park Rtes. 5, 9, and 35; 29°08′03″N 103°30′51″W	Big Bend National Park	
4	Daniels Farm House	Daniels Farm House	October 20, 1989 (#89001627)	W of Rio Grande Village in Big Bend National Park; 29°11′08″N 102°58′18″W	Rio Grande Village	
5	Gage Hotel	Gage Hotel	December 4, 2020 (#100005910)	102 NW 1st St. (US 90 West); 30°12′24″N 103°14′46″W	Marathon	
6	Hot Springs	Hot Springs	September 17, 1974 (#74000278)	W of Rio Grande Village; 29°10′39″N 102°59′56″W	Big Bend National Park	
7	Luna Jacal	Luna Jacal	November 8, 1974 (#74000282)	At base of Pena Mountain in Big Bend National Park; 29°12′56″N 103°32′05″W	Big Bend National Park	
8	Mariscal Mine	Mariscal Mine	September 13, 1974 (#74000279)	River Rd. 29°05′42″N 103°11′17″W	Big Bend National Park	
9	Nolte-Rooney House	Nolte-Rooney House	April 17, 1997 (#97000360)	307 E. Sul Ross Ave. 30°21′37″N 103°39′35″W	Alpine	Recorded Texas Historic Landmark
10	Panther Junction Mission 66 Historic District	Panther Junction Mission 66 Historic District	September 19, 2014 (#14000626)	P.O. Box 129; 29°19′40″N 103°12′21″W	Big Bend National Park	
11	Rancho Estelle	Rancho Estelle	September 3, 1974 (#74000280)	On the Rio Grande; 29°09′20″N 103°34′35″W	Big Bend National Park	
12	Terlingua Historic District	Terlingua Historic District	March 10, 1996 (#96000132)	7 mi. W of jct. of TX 118 and TX 170; 29°19′15″N 103°36′57″W	Terlingua	
13	Homer Wilson Ranch	Homer Wilson Ranch	April 14, 1975 (#75000153)	8 mi. S of Santa Elena Junction on Park Rte. 5, Big Bend National Park; 29°12′50″N 103°22′00″W	Santa Elena Junction	

Culberson

	Name on the Register	Image	Date listed	Location	City or town	Description
1	Butterfield Overland Mail Corridor	Butterfield Overland Mail Corridor	August 27, 2014 (#14000524)	400 Pine Canyon Road. (Guadalupe Mountains National Park); 31°53′36″N 104°48′57″W	Salt Flat vicinity	Extends into Hudspeth County.
2	Clark Hotel	Clark Hotel	July 19, 1979 (#79002929)	112 Broadway St. 31°02′24″N 104°49′55″W	Van Horn	Recorded Texas Historic Landmark
3	First Presbyterian Church	First Presbyterian Church	December 1, 1978 (#78002912)	Fannin and 3rd Sts. 31°02′33″N 104°50′05″W	Van Horn	Recorded Texas Historic Landmark
4	Granado Cave	Granado Cave	March 25, 1977 (#77001436)	Address restricted	Toyah	
5	Guadalupe Ranch	Guadalupe Ranch	November 21, 1978 (#78000259)	Northeast of Salt Flat in Guadalupe Mountains National Park; 31°54′27″N 104°48′00″W	Salt Flat	Frijole Ranch, also known as Guadalupe Ranch, Spring Hill Ranch and the Rader-Smith Ranch.
6	Lobo Valley Petroglyph Site	Lobo Valley Petroglyph Site	October 25, 1988 (#88002012)	Address restricted	Lobo	
7	McKittrick Canyon Archeological District, Guadalupe Mountains National Park	McKittrick Canyon Archeological District, Guadalupe Mountains National Park	September 26, 1991 (#91001381)	Guadalupe Mountains National Park; 31°58′45″N 104°45′17″W	Salt Flat	
8	Pinery Station	Pinery Station	October 9, 1974 (#74000281)	Off US 62 / US 180; 31°53′38″N 104°49′01″W	Guadalupe Mountains National Park	
9	Wallace E. Pratt House	Wallace E. Pratt House	December 15, 2011 (#11000927)	Pratt Dr. at McKittrick Rd. 31°57′29″N 104°45′32″W	Salt Flat vicinity	
10	Wallace Pratt Lodge	Wallace Pratt Lodge	March 26, 1975 (#75000154)	At junction of north and south branch of McKittrick Canyon; 31°59′01″N 104°46′50″W	Guadalupe Mountains National Park	

El Paso

	Name on the Register	Image	Date listed	Location	City or town	Description
1	Abdou Building	Abdou Building	September 24, 1980 (#80004100)	115 N. Mesa St. 31°45′30″N 106°29′13″W	El Paso	Commercial Structures of El Paso by Henry C. Trost Thematic Resources
2	O. T. Bassett Tower	O. T. Bassett Tower	September 24, 1980 (#80004101)	301 Texas Ave. 31°45′35″N 106°29′11″W	El Paso	Commercial Structures of El Paso by Henry C. Trost Thematic Resources
3	Richard Caples Building	Richard Caples Building	September 24, 1980 (#80004102)	300 E. San Antonio Ave. 31°45′29″N 106°29′12″W	El Paso	Commercial Structures of El Paso by Henry C. Trost Thematic Resources
4	Castner Range Archeological District	Castner Range Archeological District	April 22, 1976 (#76002021)	Address restricted	El Paso	At Castner Range National Monument
5	Chamizal National Memorial	Chamizal National Memorial	February 4, 1974 (#74002069)	Paisano Dr. 31°45′35″N 106°29′58″W	El Paso	
6	Sgt. Doyle Site	Sgt. Doyle Site	April 11, 1977 (#77001439)	Address restricted	El Paso	
7	El Paso County Water Improvement District No. 1		August 25, 1997 (#97000885)	Starting at the jct. of US 80 and US 85, along TX 20 to Alamo Alto; 31°33′58″N 106°14′18″W	El Paso	
8	El Paso High School	El Paso High School	November 17, 1980 (#80004103)	1600 N. Virginia St. 31°46′21″N 106°29′23″W	El Paso	Recorded Texas Historic Landmark
9	El Paso Natural Gas Company (Blue Flame) Building	El Paso Natural Gas Company (Blue Flame) Building	February 13, 2018 (#100002129)	120 N Stanton; 31°45′33″N 106°29′10″W	El Paso	
10	El Paso Union Passenger Station	El Paso Union Passenger Station	April 3, 1975 (#75001970)	SW corner of Coldwell at San Francisco St. 31°45′26″N 106°29′45″W	El Paso	Recorded Texas Historic Landmark
11	El Paso US Courthouse	El Paso US Courthouse	April 25, 2001 (#01000434)	511 W. San Antonio Ave. 31°45′33″N 106°29′00″W	El Paso	
12	Elephant Butte Irrigation District		August 8, 1997 (#97000822)	Roughly along U.S. Route 85 between its junction with New Mexico State Road 90 and the El Paso city limits 32°12′58″N 106°57′31″W	Las Cruces	Extends into Doña Ana County, New Mexico and Sierra County, New Mexico
13	First Mortgage Company Building	First Mortgage Company Building	June 13, 1978 (#78002925)	109 N. Oregon St. 31°45′29″N 106°29′17″W	El Paso	
14	Fort Bliss Main Post Historic District	Fort Bliss Main Post Historic District	May 7, 1998 (#98000427)	Fort Bliss; 31°48′26″N 106°25′56″W	El Paso	
15	Fort Bliss National Cemetery	Fort Bliss National Cemetery	March 8, 2016 (#16000066)	5200 Fred Wilson Boulevard; 31°49′22″N 106°25′25″W	El Paso	
16	Franklin Canal	Franklin Canal	June 19, 1992 (#92000696)	Roughly, S of the Texas and Pacific-Southern Pacific RR tracks from western El Paso to Fabens; 31°40′21″N 106°22′35″W	El Paso	
17	Fusselman Canyon Rock Art District	Fusselman Canyon Rock Art District	June 3, 1976 (#76002022)	Address restricted	El Paso	At Castner Range National Monument
18	W. S. Hills Commercial Structure	W. S. Hills Commercial Structure	September 24, 1980 (#80004104)	215-219 San Antonio Ave. 31°45′29″N 106°29′13″W	El Paso	
19	Hot Well Archeological Site	Hot Well Archeological Site	April 30, 1976 (#76002023)	Address restricted	El Paso	
20	Hotel Cortez	Hotel Cortez	September 24, 1980 (#80004105)	300 N. Mesa St. 31°45′35″N 106°29′14″W	El Paso	Commercial Structures of El Paso by Henry C. Trost Thematic Resources, Recorded Texas Historic Landmark
21	Hotel Paso del Norte	Hotel Paso del Norte	January 5, 1979 (#79002933)	115 El Paso St. 31°53′20″N 106°34′15″W	El Paso	Commercial Structures of El Paso by Henry C. Trost Thematic Resources
22	House at 912 Magoffin Avenue	House at 912 Magoffin Avenue	June 23, 2003 (#03000557)	912 Magoffin Ave; 31°45′41″N 106°28′43″W	El Paso	
23	Hueco Tanks	Hueco Tanks	July 14, 1971 (#71000930)	East of El Paso; 31°55′13″N 106°02′19″W	El Paso	State Historic Site (TPWD); designated a National Historic Landmark in 2021.
24	Kress Building	Kress Building	October 17, 2022 (#100008275)	211 North Mesa St. 31°45′33″N 106°29′15″W	El Paso	
25	Magoffin Historic District		October 11, 2016 (#16000717)	Roughly bounded by San Antonio, Virginia, Myrtle, and Cotton Sts. 31°45′45″N 106°28′36″W	El Paso	179 contributing buildings.
26	Magoffin Homestead	Magoffin Homestead	March 31, 1971 (#71000931)	1120 Magoffin Ave. 31°45′45″N 106°28′36″W	El Paso	State Historic Site (THC); State Antiquities Landmark; Recorded Texas Historic Landmark
27	Manhattan Heights Historic District	Manhattan Heights Historic District	September 27, 1980 (#80004107)	Roughly bounded by Grant, Louisiana and Richmond Aves. 31°47′26″N 106°27′32″W	El Paso	
28	Martin Building	Martin Building	August 8, 1984 (#84001655)	215 N. Stanton St. 31°45′35″N 106°29′11″W	El Paso	Recorded Texas Historic Landmark
29	Mesa Pump Plant		June 19, 2009 (#09000450)	4901 Fred Wilson Avenue; 31°49′35″N 106°25′43″W	El Paso	Recorded Texas Historic Landmark
30	Mills Building	Mills Building	March 21, 2011 (#11000130)	303 N. Oregon St. 31°45′33″N 106°29′21″W	El Paso	Described, but not included in Commercial Structures of El Paso by Henry C. Trost Thematic Resources due to alterations
31	Mission Socorro Archeological Site	Mission Socorro Archeological Site	January 22, 1993 (#92001741)	Address restricted	Socorro	
32	Montana Avenue Historic District	Montana Avenue Historic District	November 13, 2004 (#04001232)	1000 through 1500 Blocks of Montana Ave. 31°46′21″N 106°28′52″W	El Paso	
33	Na Hlu Hli Tui (Old Village)		September 5, 2023 (#100009300)	Address Restricted	El Paso vicinity	
34	J. J. Newberry Company	J. J. Newberry Company	September 24, 1980 (#80004108)	201-205 N. Stanton St. 31°45′33″N 106°29′10″W	El Paso	Commercial Structures of El Paso by Henry C. Trost Thematic Resources
35	Northgate Site	Northgate Site	March 16, 1972 (#72001356)	Address restricted	El Paso	At Castner Range National Monument
36	Old Bnai Zion Synagogue	Old Bnai Zion Synagogue	August 16, 1984 (#84001658)	906 N. El Paso St. 31°45′37″N 106°29′22″W	El Paso	State Antiquities Landmark; Recorded Texas Historic Landmark
37	Old Fort Bliss	Old Fort Bliss	February 23, 1972 (#72001357)	1800 block of Doniphan St. 31°45′47″N 106°30′33″W	El Paso	Recorded Texas Historic Landmark
38	Old San Francisco Historic District	Old San Francisco Historic District	May 21, 1985 (#85001132)	Missouri St. between No. 325 and 527; 31°45′33″N 106°29′39″W	El Paso	
39	Palace Theatre	Palace Theatre	September 24, 1980 (#80004109)	209 S. El Paso St. 31°45′25″N 106°29′19″W	El Paso	Alhambra Theatre, Commercial Structures of El Paso by Henry C. Trost Thematic Resources
40	Patterson Apartments		January 19, 2022 (#100007381)	1217 North Mesa St. 31°46′00″N 106°29′39″W	El Paso	
41	Plaza Hotel	Plaza Hotel	September 24, 1980 (#80004110)	Oregon and Mills Sts. 31°45′31″N 106°29′18″W	El Paso	Commercial Structures of El Paso by Henry C. Trost Thematic Resources
42	Plaza Theatre	Plaza Theatre	June 4, 1987 (#87000902)	125 Pioneer Plaza; 31°45′31″N 106°29′11″W	El Paso	
43	Popular Department Store	Popular Department Store	September 24, 1980 (#80004111)	102 N. Mesa St. 31°45′30″N 106°29′10″W	El Paso	Commercial Structures of El Paso by Henry C. Trost Thematic Resources
44	Presidio Chapel of San Elizario	Presidio Chapel of San Elizario	September 14, 1972 (#72001358)	S side of plaza 31°35′05″N 106°16′22″W	San Elizario	Recorded Texas Historic Landmark
45	Quarters Number 1	Quarters Number 1	April 9, 1987 (#87000484)	228 Sheridan Rd. 31°48′29″N 106°26′15″W	Fort Bliss	
46	Rio Grande Avenue Historic District		September 9, 1999 (#99001140)	Roughly bounded by Rio Grande, Navada, Kansas, and Campbell Sts. 31°46′10″N 106°29′14″W	El Paso	
47	Rio Vista Bracero Reception Center	Rio Vista Bracero Reception Center	December 11, 2023 (#100009831)	800-860 and 901 North Rio Vista Road; 31°39′41″N 106°15′59″W	Socorro	A subset of the Rio Vista Farm Historic District.
48	Rio Vista Farm Historic District	Rio Vista Farm Historic District	February 22, 1996 (#96000131)	800-801 Rio Vista Rd. 31°39′41″N 106°15′52″W	Socorro	
49	Roberts-Banner Building	Roberts-Banner Building	September 24, 1980 (#80004112)	215 N. Mesa St. 31°45′32″N 106°29′14″W	El Paso	Commercial Structures of El Paso by Henry C. Trost Thematic Resources
50	San Elizario Historic District	San Elizario Historic District	February 27, 1997 (#97000205)	Roughly bounded by Rio Grande St., Socorro and Convent Rds., and the San Elizario Lateral; 31°35′07″N 106°16′21″W	San Elizario	
51	Segundo Barrio Historic District		November 3, 2021 (#100006994)	Roughly Bounded by South Santa Fe St., South Oregon St., East 9th Ave., Cotton St., Paisano Dr., and East Father Rahm Ave. 31°45′14″N 106°28′52″W	El Paso	
52	Ray Sherman Place		March 25, 2019 (#100003534)	4528 Blanco Ave. 31°45′55″N 106°26′11″W	El Paso	
53	Silver Dollar Cafe	Silver Dollar Cafe	August 14, 1986 (#86002618)	1021 S. Mesa; 31°44′58″N 106°29′02″W	El Paso	
54	Singer Sewing Company	Singer Sewing Company	September 24, 1980 (#80004113)	211 Texas Ave. 31°45′33″N 106°29′12″W	El Paso	Commercial Structures of El Paso by Henry C. Trost Thematic Resources, Recorded Texas Historic Landmark
55	Socorro Mission	Socorro Mission	March 16, 1972 (#72001359)	Moon Rd. and TX 258; 31°39′30″N 106°18′09″W	Socorro	State Antiquities Landmark; Recorded Texas Historic Landmark
56	State National Bank	State National Bank	September 24, 1980 (#80004114)	114 E. San Antonio Ave. 31°45′27″N 106°29′15″W	El Paso	Commercial Structures of El Paso by Henry C. Trost Thematic Resources
57	Sunset Heights Historic District	Sunset Heights Historic District	December 8, 1988 (#88002672)	Roughly bounded by Heisig Ave., River Ave., N. El Paso St., and I-10; 31°45′47″N 106°29′53″W	El Paso	
58	Tays Place		March 25, 2019 (#100003535)	2114 E. Magoffin Ave. 31°46′11″N 106°27′52″W	El Paso	
59	Toltec Club	Toltec Club	March 12, 1979 (#79002934)	602 Magoffin Ave. 31°45′33″N 106°28′56″W	El Paso	
60	Henry C. Trost House	Henry C. Trost House	July 12, 1976 (#76002024)	1013 W. Yandell Dr. 31°45′52″N 106°29′58″W	El Paso	
61	U.S. Post Office	U.S. Post Office	July 19, 1984 (#84001662)	219 Mills Ave. 31°45′36″N 106°29′13″W	El Paso	
62	White House Department Store and Hotel McCoy	White House Department Store and Hotel McCoy	September 24, 1980 (#80004115)	109 Pioneer Plaza; 31°45′32″N 106°29′19″W	El Paso	Commercial Structures of El Paso by Henry C. Trost Thematic Resources
63	Women's Club	Women's Club	July 22, 1979 (#79002935)	1400 N. Mesa St. 31°46′02″N 106°29′40″W	El Paso	Recorded Texas Historic Landmark
64	Ysleta Mission	Ysleta Mission	July 31, 1972 (#72001360)	TX 20 near jct. with Zaragosa Rd. 31°41′27″N 106°19′38″W	Ysleta	Recorded Texas Historic Landmark

Hudspeth

	Name on the Register	Image	Date listed	Location	City or town	Description
1	Alamo Canyon-Wilkey Ranch Discontiguous Archeological District		October 28, 1988 (#88002151)	Address restricted	Fort Hancock	
2	Archeological Site No. 41 HZ 1		January 11, 1991 (#90002015)	Address restricted	Sierra Blanca	Indian Hot Springs MPS
3	Archeological Site No. 41 HZ 7		January 11, 1991 (#90002016)	Address restricted	Sierra Blanca	Indian Hot Springs MPS
4	Archeological Site No. 41 HZ 181		January 11, 1991 (#90002017)	Address restricted	Sierra Blanca	Indian Hot Springs MPS
5	Archeological Site No. 41 HZ 182		January 11, 1991 (#90002018)	Address restricted	Sierra Blanca	Indian Hot Springs MPS
6	Archeological Site No. 41 HZ 183		January 11, 1991 (#90002019)	Address restricted	Sierra Blanca	Indian Hot Springs MPS
7	Archeological Site No. 41 HZ 184		January 11, 1991 (#90002020)	Address restricted	Sierra Blanca	Indian Hot Springs MPS
8	Archeological Site No. 41 HZ 190		January 11, 1991 (#90002021)	Address restricted	Sierra Blanca	Indian Hot Springs MPS
9	Archeological Site No. 41 HZ 200		January 11, 1991 (#90002022)	Address restricted	Sierra Blanca	Indian Hot Springs MPS
10	Archeological Site No. 41 HZ 220		January 11, 1991 (#90002023)	Address restricted	Sierra Blanca	Candelilla wax camp; Indian Hot Springs MPS
11	Archeological Site No. 41 HZ 227	Archeological Site No. 41 HZ 227	January 11, 1991 (#90002024)	Address restricted	Sierra Blanca	Likely a location of a 10th Cavalry camp site near Indian Hot Springs that was ambushed on October 28, 1880; Indian Hot Springs MPS
12	Archeological Site No. 41 HZ 228	Archeological Site No. 41 HZ 228	January 11, 1991 (#90002025)	Address restricted	Sierra Blanca	Gravesite near Indian Hot Springs of seven 10th Cavalry members who were killed in an ambush on October 28, 1880; Indian Hot Springs MPS
13	Archeological Site No. 41 HZ 283		January 11, 1991 (#90002026)	Address restricted	Sierra Blanca	Indian Hot Springs MPS
14	Archeological Site No. 41 HZ 284		January 11, 1991 (#90002027)	Address restricted	Sierra Blanca	Indian Hot Springs MPS
15	Archeological Site No. 41 HZ 285		January 11, 1991 (#90002028)	Address restricted	Sierra Blanca	Indian Hot Springs MPS
16	Archeological Site No. 41 HZ 286		January 11, 1991 (#90002029)	Address restricted	Sierra Blanca	Indian Hot Springs MPS
17	Archeological Site No. 41 HZ 287		January 11, 1991 (#90002030)	Address restricted	Sierra Blanca	Indian Hot Springs MPS
18	Archeological Site No. 41 HZ 288		January 11, 1991 (#90002031)	Address restricted	Sierra Blanca	Indian Hot Springs MPS
19	Archeological Site No. 41 HZ 289		January 11, 1991 (#90002032)	Address restricted	Sierra Blanca	Indian Hot Springs MPS
20	Archeological Site No. 41 HZ 290		January 11, 1991 (#90002033)	Address restricted	Sierra Blanca	Indian Hot Springs MPS
21	Archeological Site No. 41 HZ 291		January 11, 1991 (#90002034)	Address restricted	Sierra Blanca	Indian Hot Springs MPS
22	Archeological Site No. 41 HZ 292		January 11, 1991 (#90002035)	Address restricted	Sierra Blanca	Indian Hot Springs MPS
23	Archeological Site No. 41 HZ 293		January 11, 1991 (#90002036)	Address restricted	Sierra Blanca	Indian Hot Springs MPS
24	Archeological Site No. 41 HZ 294		January 11, 1991 (#90002037)	Address restricted	Sierra Blanca	Indian Hot Springs MPS
25	Archeological Site No. 41 HZ 295		January 11, 1991 (#90002038)	Address restricted	Sierra Blanca	Indian Hot Springs MPS
26	Archeological Site No. 41 HZ 296		January 11, 1991 (#90002039)	Address restricted	Sierra Blanca	Indian Hot Springs MPS
27	Archeological Site No. 41 HZ 297		January 11, 1991 (#90002040)	Address restricted	Sierra Blanca	Indian Hot Springs MPS
28	Archeological Site No. 41 HZ 298		January 11, 1991 (#90002041)	Address restricted	Sierra Blanca	Indian Hot Springs MPS
29	Archeological Site No. 41 HZ 299		January 11, 1991 (#90002042)	Address restricted	Sierra Blanca	Indian Hot Springs MPS
30	Archeological Site No. 41 HZ 300		January 11, 1991 (#90002043)	Address restricted	Sierra Blanca	Indian Hot Springs MPS
31	Archeological Site No. 41 HZ 301		January 11, 1991 (#90002044)	Address restricted	Sierra Blanca	Indian Hot Springs MPS
32	Archeological Site No. 41 HZ 302		January 11, 1991 (#90002045)	Address restricted	Sierra Blanca	Indian Hot Springs MPS
33	Archeological Site No. 41 HZ 303		January 11, 1991 (#90002046)	Address restricted	Sierra Blanca	Indian Hot Springs MPS
34	Archeological Site No. 41 HZ 304-305		January 11, 1991 (#90002047)	Address restricted	Sierra Blanca	Indian Hot Springs MPS
35	Archeological Site No. 41 HZ 306		January 11, 1991 (#90002048)	Address restricted	Sierra Blanca	Indian Hot Springs MPS
36	Archeological Site No. 41 HZ 307		January 11, 1991 (#90002049)	Address restricted	Sierra Blanca	Indian Hot Springs MPS
37	Archeological Site No. 41 HZ 308		January 11, 1991 (#90002050)	Address restricted	Sierra Blanca	Indian Hot Springs MPS
38	Archeological Site No. 41 HZ 309		January 11, 1991 (#90002051)	Address restricted	Sierra Blanca	Indian Hot Springs MPS
39	Archeological Site No. 41 HZ 311	Archeological Site No. 41 HZ 311	January 11, 1991 (#90002052)	Address restricted	Sierra Blanca	Indian Hot Springs MPS
40	Archeological Site No. 41 HZ 312	Archeological Site No. 41 HZ 312	January 11, 1991 (#90002053)	Address restricted	Sierra Blanca	Indian Hot Springs MPS
41	Archeological Site No. 41 HZ 313		January 11, 1991 (#90002054)	Address restricted	Sierra Blanca	Indian Hot Springs MPS
42	Archeological Site No. 41 HZ 339		January 11, 1991 (#90002055)	Address restricted	Sierra Blanca	Indian Hot Springs MPS
43	Archeological Site No. 41 HZ 340		January 11, 1991 (#90002056)	Address restricted	Sierra Blanca	Indian Hot Springs MPS
44	Archeological Site No. 41 HZ 409		January 11, 1991 (#90002057)	Address restricted	Sierra Blanca	Indian Hot Springs MPS
45	Archeological Site No. 41 HZ 410		January 11, 1991 (#90002058)	Address restricted	Sierra Blanca	Indian Hot Springs MPS
46	Archeological Site No. 41 HZ 411		January 11, 1991 (#90002059)	Address restricted	Sierra Blanca	Indian Hot Springs MPS
47	Archeological Site No. 41 HZ 412		January 11, 1991 (#90002060)	Address restricted	Sierra Blanca	Indian Hot Springs MPS
48	Archeological Site No. 41 HZ 413		January 11, 1991 (#90002061)	Address restricted	Sierra Blanca	Indian Hot Springs MPS
49	Archeological Site No. 41 HZ 414		January 11, 1991 (#90002062)	Address restricted	Sierra Blanca	Indian Hot Springs MPS
50	Archeological Site No. 41 HZ 415		January 11, 1991 (#90002063)	Address restricted	Sierra Blanca	Candelilla-wax camp; Indian Hot Springs MPS
51	Archeological Site No. 41 HZ 416		January 11, 1991 (#90002064)	Address restricted	Sierra Blanca	Indian Hot Springs MPS
52	Archeological Site No. 41 HZ 417		January 11, 1991 (#90002065)	Address restricted	Sierra Blanca	Indian Hot Springs MPS
53	Archeological Site No. 41 HZ 418		January 11, 1991 (#90002066)	Address restricted	Sierra Blanca	Indian Hot Springs MPS
54	Archeological Site No. 41 HZ 419		January 11, 1991 (#90002067)	Address restricted	Sierra Blanca	Indian Hot Springs MPS
55	Archeological Site No. 41 HZ 420		January 11, 1991 (#90002068)	Address restricted	Sierra Blanca	Indian Hot Springs MPS
56	Archeological Site No. 41 HZ 421		January 11, 1991 (#90002069)	Address restricted	Sierra Blanca	Indian Hot Springs MPS
57	Archeological Site No. 41 HZ 422		January 11, 1991 (#90002070)	Address restricted	Sierra Blanca	Indian Hot Springs MPS
58	Archeological Site No. 41 HZ 423		January 11, 1991 (#90002071)	Address restricted	Sierra Blanca	Candelilla-wax camp; Indian Hot Springs MPS
59	Archeological Site No. 41 HZ 424		January 11, 1991 (#90002072)	Address restricted	Sierra Blanca	Indian Hot Springs MPS
60	Archeological Site No. 41 HZ 425	Archeological Site No. 41 HZ 425	January 11, 1991 (#90002073)	Address restricted	Sierra Blanca	Indian Hot Springs MPS
61	Archeological Site No. 41 HZ 426		January 11, 1991 (#90002074)	Address restricted	Sierra Blanca	Indian Hot Springs MPS
62	Archeological Site No. 41 HZ 427		January 11, 1991 (#90002075)	Address restricted	Sierra Blanca	Indian Hot Springs MPS
63	Archeological Site No. 41 HZ 428		January 11, 1991 (#90002076)	Address restricted	Sierra Blanca	Indian Hot Springs MPS
64	Archeological Site No. 41 HZ 429		January 11, 1991 (#90002077)	Address restricted	Sierra Blanca	Indian Hot Springs MPS
65	Archeological Site No. 41 HZ 430		January 11, 1991 (#90002078)	Address restricted	Sierra Blanca	Indian Hot Springs MPS
66	Archeological Site No. 41 HZ 431		January 11, 1991 (#90002079)	Address restricted	Sierra Blanca	Indian Hot Springs MPS
67	Archeological Site No. 41 HZ 432		January 11, 1991 (#90002080)	Address restricted	Sierra Blanca	Indian Hot Springs MPS
68	Archeological Site No. 41 HZ 433		January 11, 1991 (#90002081)	Address restricted	Sierra Blanca	Indian Hot Springs MPS
69	Archeological Site No. 41 HZ 434		January 11, 1991 (#90002082)	Address restricted	Sierra Blanca	Indian Hot Springs MPS
70	Archeological Site No. 41 HZ 435		January 11, 1991 (#90002083)	Address restricted	Sierra Blanca	Indian Hot Springs MPS
71	Archeological Site No. 41 HZ 436		January 11, 1991 (#90002084)	Address restricted	Sierra Blanca	Indian Hot Springs MPS
72	Archeological Site No. 41 HZ 437		January 11, 1991 (#90002085)	Address restricted	Sierra Blanca	Indian Hot Springs MPS
73	Archeological Site No. 41 HZ 438	Archeological Site No. 41 HZ 438	January 11, 1991 (#90002086)	Address restricted	Sierra Blanca	Indian Hot Springs MPS
74	Archeological Site No. 41 HZ 439		January 11, 1991 (#90002087)	Address restricted	Sierra Blanca	Tenth Cavalry campsite; Indian Hot Springs MPS
75	Archeological Site No. 41 HZ 440		January 11, 1991 (#90002088)	Address restricted	Sierra Blanca	Indian Hot Springs MPS
76	Archeological Site No. 41 HZ 441		January 11, 1991 (#90002089)	Address restricted	Sierra Blanca	Indian Hot Springs MPS
77	Archeological Site No. 41 HZ 442		January 11, 1991 (#90002090)	Address restricted	Sierra Blanca	Indian Hot Springs MPS
78	Archeological Site No. 41 HZ 443		January 11, 1991 (#90002091)	Address restricted	Sierra Blanca	Indian Hot Springs MPS
79	Archeological Site No. 41 HZ 445	Archeological Site No. 41 HZ 445	January 11, 1991 (#90002093)	Address restricted	Sierra Blanca	Indian Hot Springs MPS
80	Archeological Site No. 41 HZ 448		January 11, 1991 (#90002094)	Address restricted	Sierra Blanca	Indian Hot Springs MPS
81	Archeological Site No. 41 HZ 464		January 11, 1991 (#90002095)	Address restricted	Sierra Blanca	Indian Hot Springs MPS
82	Archeological Site No. 41 HZ 465		January 11, 1991 (#90002096)	Address restricted	Sierra Blanca	Indian Hot Springs MPS
83	Butterfield Overland Mail Corridor	Butterfield Overland Mail Corridor	August 27, 2014 (#14000524)	400 Pine Canyon Road. (Guadalupe Mountains National Park); 31°53′36″N 104°48′57″W	Salt Flat vicinity	Extends into Culberson County.
84	Hudspeth County Courthouse	Hudspeth County Courthouse	May 21, 1975 (#75001993)	Millican St. 31°10′47″N 105°21′25″W	Sierra Blanca	State Antiquities Landmark; Recorded Texas Historic Landmark
85	Indian Hot Springs Health Resort Historic District	Indian Hot Springs Health Resort Historic District	January 11, 1991 (#90002092)	Along the Rio Grande south of Sierra Blanca; 30°49′31″N 105°19′32″W	Sierra Blanca	Indian Hot Springs MPS
86	Rod Johnson Site		November 1, 1979 (#79002979)	Address restricted	Sierra Blanca	
87	Red Rock Archeological Complex	Red Rock Archeological Complex	May 2, 1977 (#77001454)	Address restricted	Allamore	
88	Tinaja de las Palmas Battle Site		November 7, 1979 (#79002980)	Address restricted	Sierra Blanca	

Jeff Davis

	Name on the Register	Image	Date listed	Location	City or town	Description
1	Fort Davis National Historic Site	Fort Davis National Historic Site	October 15, 1966 (#66000045)	Junction of State Highways 17 and 118; 30°35′55″N 103°53′40″W	Fort Davis	National Historic Landmark; frontier Army fort established in 1854
2	Grierson-Sproul House	Grierson-Sproul House	August 11, 1982 (#82004508)	Court Ave. 30°35′26″N 103°54′17″W	Fort Davis	Recorded Texas Historic Landmark
3	Hotel Limpia	Hotel Limpia	March 3, 2025 (#100011474)	101 Memorial Square; 30°35′21″N 103°53′39″W	Fort Davis	
4	Jeff Davis County Courthouse	Jeff Davis County Courthouse	July 11, 2002 (#02000728)	Bounded by Court St., Front St., Woodward Ave., and State St. (SH 17 / SH 118); 30°35′18″N 103°53′42″W	Fort Davis	Recorded Texas Historic Landmark; State Antiquities Landmark; erected 1910-1911
5	Phantom Lake Spring Site		May 10, 1995 (#95000501)	Address restricted	Toyahvale	
6	Henry M. and Annie V. Trueheart House	Henry M. and Annie V. Trueheart House	September 12, 1996 (#96001014)	Madrone St. between Court Ave. and Woodward Ave. 30°35′20″N 103°54′08″W	Fort Davis	Recorded Texas Historic Landmark

Presidio

	Name on the Register	Image	Date listed	Location	City or town	Description
1	Blackwell School	Blackwell School	December 4, 2019 (#100004751)	501 South Abbot St. 30°18′21″N 104°01′20″W	Marfa	
2	Building 98, Fort D.A. Russell	Building 98, Fort D.A. Russell	February 25, 2004 (#04000100)	W. Bonnie St. 30°18′11″N 104°01′39″W	Marfa	Recorded Texas Historic Landmark
3	Central Marfa Historic District		April 18, 2022 (#100007597)	Roughly bounded by Washington, Dallas, Dean, Russell, Austin and Abbott Sts. 29°51′43″N 104°20′01″W	Marfa	
4	El Fortin del Cibolo Historic District	El Fortin del Cibolo Historic District	April 6, 1995 (#95000366)	Approximately 4 mi (6.4 km) northwest of Shafter, west of US 67; 29°51′43″N 104°20′01″W	Shafter	Recorded Texas Historic Landmark; now part of Cibolo Creek Ranch
5	El Paisano Hotel	El Paisano Hotel	August 1, 1978 (#78002973)	N. Highland St. and W. Texas St. 30°18′44″N 104°01′19″W	Marfa	Recorded Texas Historic Landmark
6	Fort D.A. Russell Historic District	Fort D.A. Russell Historic District	December 14, 2006 (#06001152)	Roughly bounded by Ridge, El Paso, Kelly streets, US 67, and RM 2810; 30°17′46″N 104°01′47″W	Marfa	Now the Chinati Foundation
7	Fort Leaton	Fort Leaton	June 18, 1973 (#73001972)	4 mi (6.4 km) east of Presidio on FM 170; 29°32′30″N 104°19′36″W	Presidio	State Historic Site (TPWD)
8	Fortin de la Cienega	Fortin de la Cienega	October 8, 1976 (#76002059)	15 mi (24 km) northeast of Shafter on Cienega Creek; 29°48′13″N 104°12′41″W	Shafter	Now part of Cibolo Creek Ranch
9	La Junta de los Rios Archeological District	La Junta de los Rios Archeological District	February 14, 1978 (#78002974)	Address restricted	Presidio	
10	La Morita Historic District		April 6, 1995 (#95000367)	Approximately 5 mi (8.0 km) southwest of Shafter, east of US 67; 29°46′51″N 104°15′16″W	Shafter	Now part of Cibolo Creek Ranch
11	Presidio County Courthouse	Presidio County Courthouse	December 20, 1977 (#77001467)	Public Square; 30°18′48″N 104°01′20″W	Marfa	State Antiquities Landmark; Recorded Texas Historic Landmark
12	Shafter Historic Mining District	Shafter Historic Mining District	May 17, 1976 (#76002058)	20 mi (32 km) north of Presidio on US 67; 29°48′50″N 104°18′24″W	Shafter	
13	Tapalcomes	Tapalcomes	March 25, 1977 (#77001468)	Address restricted	Redford	Polvo site (41PS21)
