= List of Trost & Trost works =

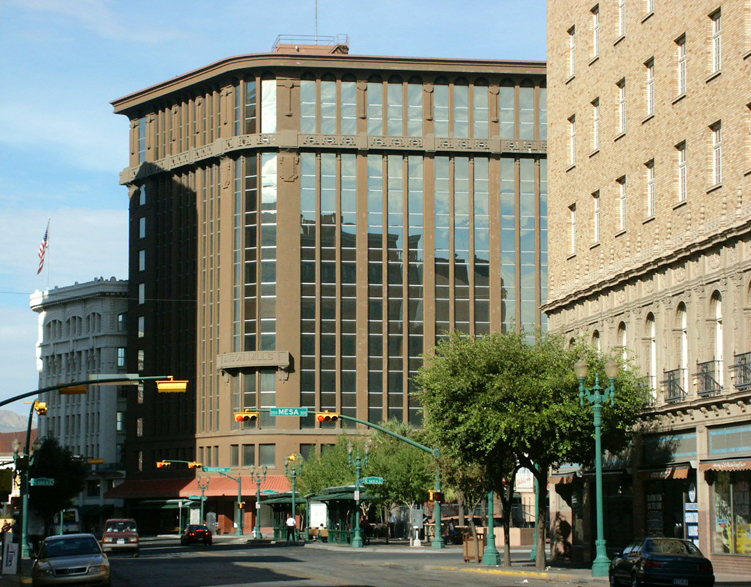
Three Trost-designed buildings in downtown El Paso, Texas; left to right: The Centre, the Anson Mills Building, and the Cortez Building

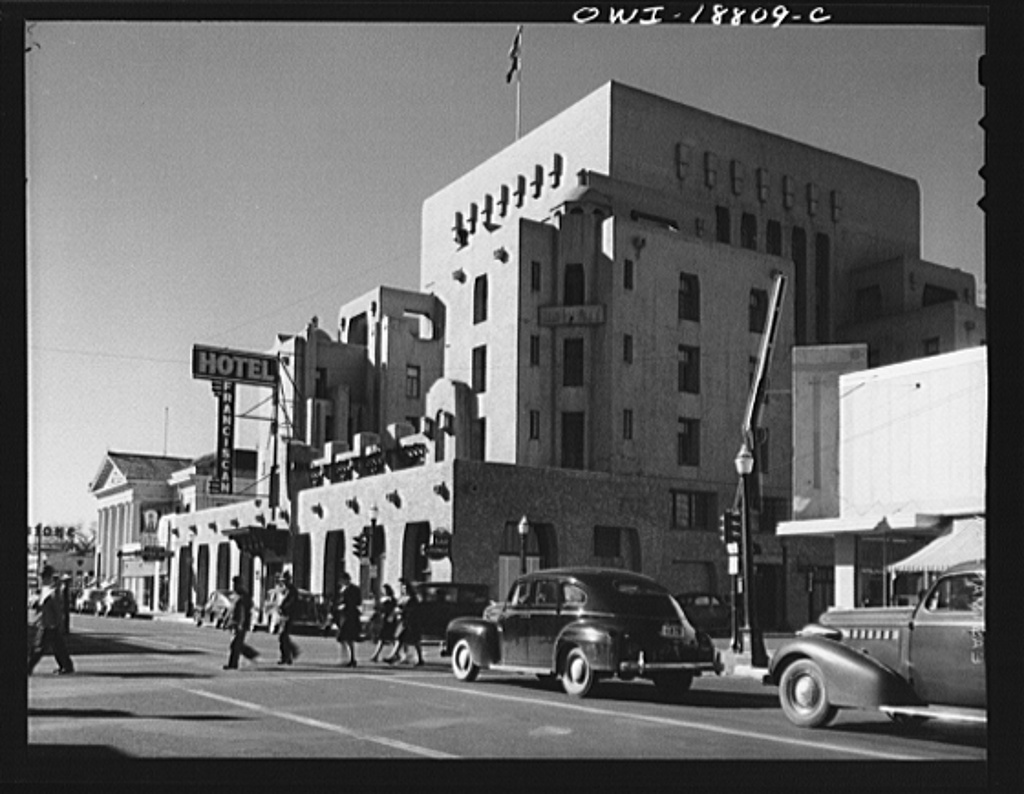
Franciscan Hotel, Albuquerque, New Mexico

This is a list of houses, commercial buildings, and other works by the Trost & Trost Architects & Engineers firm.

== List ==
List of houses, commercial buildings, and other works by Trost & Trost
Building	Year built	Location	Alternate name(s)	Structure Change, Date	Designer; Notes
University of Arizona – South Hall	1898	Tucson, Arizona		Demolished; 1958	Solo planning by Henry C. Trost
Gardiner / Ramsey House	1901	Tucson, Arizona			Henry C. Trost
Morenci Club	1902	Morenci, Arizona		Demolished; early 1980s	
Hotel Morenci	1902	Morenci, Arizona		Demolished; early 1980s	
St. Josephs Academy	1903	El Paso, Texas		Demolished, year unk	Henry C. Trost; 700-704 N El Paso St.
Henry C. Trost residence	1903	El Paso, Texas			Henry C. Trost
Santa Cruz County Court House	1904	Nogales, Arizona			Trost & Rust
W.W. Turney residence	1906	El Paso, Texas	International Museum of Art		
El Paso YMCA	1906–1908	El Paso, Texas		Demolished; 1961	Designed by Henry C. Trost
First Presbyterian Church	1906–1908	El Paso, Texas		Demolished (year unknown)	Henry C. Trost
Manning House	1907–1908	El Presidio neighborhood; Tucson, Arizona	Mayoral Mansion		Henry C. Trost
James S. Douglas House	1908	Douglas, Arizona	Douglas Historical Society Museum		
W.W. Turney residence	1908	El Paso	El Paso Museum of Art; International Museum of Art		Trost & Trost
Vilas School	1908–1909	El Paso, Texas			Henry C. Trost
Old El Paso Country Club	1908–1909			Destroyed by fire; 1916	Henry C. Trost; on Club Road, west of Ft. Bliss
Henry C. Trost House	1908–1909	El Paso, Texas			Trost & Trost; NRHP July 12, 1976
Richard Caples Building	1909	El Paso, Texas			Henry C. Trost; NRHP
El Paso Military Institute – Dormitory	1909	El Paso, Texas			Henry C. Trost
New Mexico State University at Las Cruces campus	1909	Las Cruces, New Mexico			
Abdou Building	1910	El Paso, Texas	Formerly the Rio Grande Valley Bank		Henry C. Trost; listed on NRHP, September 1980
Roberts-Banner Building	1910	El Paso, Texas			Henry C. Trost; listed on NRHP, September 24, 1980
Rosenwald Building	1910	Albuquerque, New Mexico			Henry C. Trost; listed on NRHP, 1978; First reinforced concrete building constructed in Albuquerque
Berthold Spitz House	1910	Albuquerque, New Mexico			Henry C. Trost; Listed on NRHP, 1977
YWCA of El Paso	1910	El Paso, Texas		Demolished (year unk)	Henry C. Trost
Southern Pacific/Arizona Eastern Railway Depot – restaurant, freight office, and station	1910–1916	Globe, Arizona			Henry C. Trost
Mills Building	1911	El Paso, Texas			Henry C. Trost; listed on NRHP, March 21, 2011
Alta Vista School	1912	El Paso, Texas		Demolished, 1968	Henry C. Trost; 3500 La Luz
Masonic Temple	1912	El Paso, Texas		Demolished, 1968	Henry C. Trost
Hotel Oregon	1912	El Paso, Texas		Demolished (year unk)	Henry C. Trost
Hotel Paso del Norte,	1912	El Paso, Texas	Marriott's Hotel Paso del Norte		Henry C. Trost; listed on NRHP, January 5, 1979
Popular Dry Goods Department Store	1912	El Paso, Texas	1 Union Fashion Center		Henry C. Trost; NRHP
White House Department Store and Hotel McCoy	1912	El Paso, Texas	The Centre		Henry C. Trost; NRHP
The Wigwam Theater – remodel	1912	El Paso, Texas		Built,	Henry C. Trost; remodeling project
Hotel Worth	1912	El Paso, Texas	Hotel Adalante; Raler Hotel; Baker Hotel; others		Henry C. Trost
Korricks' Department Store	1912–13	Phoenix, Arizona			Henry C. Trost
Lydia Patterson Institute	1913	El Paso, Texas		Demolished, 1963-64	Trost & Trost; 503 South Florence St.
El Paso High School	1913–1916	El Paso, Texas			Henry C. Trost, NRHP
Temple San Ignacio de Loyola – addition	1913–1922	El Paso, Texas		Built, 1905; Remodeled, 1913–1922	Gustavus A. Trost
Old Albuquerque High School – main building	1914	Albuquerque, New Mexico	Loft apartments	Abandoned, 1974; Renovated early 2000s	Henry C. Trost; on Albuquerque Historic Landmark list
The Palace Theater	1914	El Paso, Texas	Formerly the Alhambra Theater		Henry C. Trost
Texas State School of Mines and Metallurgy – Assay Office	1914	El Paso, Texas		Demolished, year unk	Henry C. Trost
Frank Courtney Mellard Residence	1915	Marfa			Trost & Trost; 401 N. Summer Ave.
Deming Armory	1915–16	Deming, New Mexico	Deming Luna Mimbres Museum		Henry C. Trost; listed on NRHP, 1983
El Paso County Court House	1915–1916	El Paso, Texas		Demolished,1988	Henry C. Trost
Texas Grand Theater Building – Renovation	1916	El Paso, Texas		Demolished, 1952	Henry C. Trost; Renovation project
Independent Order of Odd Fellows Lodge #284	1916	El Paso, Texas		Demolished, year unk	Henry C. Trost
Occidental Life Building	1917	Albuquerque, New Mexico			Trost & Trost; Its style is inspired by the Doge's Palace in Venice
University of Texas at El Paso – old Main building	1917	El Paso, Texas			Henry C. Trost
University of Texas at El Paso – Quinn Hall	1917	El Paso, Texas			Henry C. Trost
University of Texas at El Paso – Graham Hall	1917	El Paso, Texas			Henry C. Trost
University of Texas at El Paso – Geology Building	1917	El Paso, Texas			Henry C. Trost
Liberty Hall Theater	1918	El Paso, Texas		Demolished, 1987	Henry C. Trost
University of Texas at El Paso – Kelly Hall	1920–1921	El Paso, Texas			Henry C. Trost
State National Bank Building	1921	El Paso, Texas			Henry C. Trost; NRHP
First National Bank Building	1922	Albuquerque, New Mexico			Henry C. Trost; Albuquerque's first skyscraper
Houston High School,	1922	El Paso, Texas			Henry C. Trost; 2851 Grant Ave.
Union High School	1922	Tombstone, Arizona			Henry C. Trost
Morehead School Addition	1922	El Paso, Texas		Demolished, year unk	Henry C. Trost; on Arizona, between Campbell and Kansas streets
Hotel Cortez – Hotel Orndorff	1922	El Paso, Texas			Henry C. Trost
Castle Apartments	1922	Albuquerque, New Mexico		Burned down 2009	Henry C. Trost
Eller Apartments	1922	Albuquerque, New Mexico			Henry C. Trost; Listed on NRHP, 1984
Loretto Academy	1922–1936	El Paso, Texas			Gustavus A. Trost; 4600 Hueco Ave. (at Hardaway St.)
Franciscan Hotel	1923	Albuquerque, New Mexico		Demolished, 1972	Henry C. Trost
New Luhrs Building	1924	Phoenix, Arizona;			Henry C. Trost; Phoenix Historic Landmark
Sunshine Building	1924	Downtown Albuquerque, New Mexico			Trost & Trost; On the list of historic landmarks in Albuquerque, New Mexico
Mieland Hotel		El Paso, Texas			Trost & Trost
El Paso Community College Building	1925	El Paso, Texas			Henry C. Trost; 103 West Rio Grande
Allen Marshall McCabe House	1925	Marfa, Texas			Trost & Trost; 309 E. Salarosa St.
Fort Hancock High School	1925	Fort Hancock			Trost & Trost
Fabens High School	1925	Fabens	O'Donnell Intermediate School		Trost & Trost
First National Bank Building	1925	Fabens, Texas		Demolished, 2016	Trost & Trost
Hotel Dieu School of Nursing	1925	El Paso, Texas		Demolished, year unk	Henry C. Trost; 1103 North Kansas
Congregation B' Naizion	1925	El Paso, Texas		Destroyed by arson, October 13, 1984	Henry C. Trost
Gage Hotel	1927	Marathon, Texas			Trost & Trost; RTHL
Kerr Mercantile Building	1927	Sanderson			Trost & Trost
Gateway Hotel – remodel	1927	El Paso, Texas			Henry C. Trost; remodel project
Kerr Mercantile Building	1927	Sanderson, Texas			Henry C. Trost
Crawford Hotel	1927-1928	Big Spring, Texas		Demolished, year unk	Trost & Trost; W. 3rd St. at Scurry
Lester Fisher Building	1927-1928	Big Spring, Texas			Trost & Trost; 106 W. 3rd St.
Gadsden High School	1928	Anthony, New Mexico			Henry C. Trost
The new The Holland Hotel	1928	Alpine, Texas; 209 W. Holland Ave.		Built 1912	Henry C. Trost; Recorded Texas Historic Landmark (RTHL); 1980; Original hotel built 1912
NAN Ranch headquarters expansion	1928	Dwyer, New Mexico;		Founded 1868	Henry C. Trost; Listed on NRHP, 1988; The project included: a new house; swimming pool; a slaughterhouse; powerhouse; and other residential and ranch buildings
St. Joseph's Sanatorium	1928	El Paso, Texas		Demolished, October 1972	Henry C. Trost; 700-704 North El Paso St.
Old Big Spring High School	1928-1929	Big Spring			Trost & Trost; 200 E. 10th St.
First Baptist Church	1928	Fabens, Texas			Trost & Trost
Luhrs Tower	1929	Downtown Phoenix, Arizona			Henry C. Trost; Building is adjacent to the Luhrs Building
New Gadsden Hotel	1929	Historic downtown Douglas, Arizona		Built, 1907; Burned down, 1929; Rebuilt 1929	Trost & Trost; Listed on NRHP, 1976
Zach White School	1929	El Paso, Texas			Gustavus A. Trost; 4864 Doniphan
Old Pecos Hospital	1929	Pecos			Trost & Trost; 601 S. Hickory St.
Plaza Hotel	1929	El Paso, Texas	New Sheldon Hotel; Hilton Hotel; Plaza Motor Hotel; others		Henry C. Trost
Sul Ross State University – Library	1929–1930	Alpine, Texas	Morelock Academic Building		
El Paso County Hospital remodel	1929–1934	El Paso, Texas		Demolished, year unk	Gustavus A. Trost; additions & replacement building
Hotel El Capitan	1930	Van Horn, Texas			Henry C. Trost
Driskill Hotel – Tower addition	1930	Austin, Texas		Built 1886	Henry C. Trost; oldest operating hotel in Austin
El Paisano Hotel	1930	Marfa, Texas			Henry C. Trost; Listed on NRHP, RTHL; August 1, 1978.
Fire Station #10	1930	El Paso, Texas			Gustavus A. Trost
Fire Station #11	1930	El Paso, Texas			Gustavus A. Trost
O. T. Bassett Tower	1930	El Paso, Texas			Henry C. Trost; NRHP; one of Henry Trost's last commissions
Coldwell School	1930	El Paso, Texas			Gustavus A. Trost; 4101 Altura Ave.
E. B. Jones School	1930	El Paso, Texas		Demolished, year unk	Gustavus A. Trost
Las Cruces Country Club clubhouse	1930	Las Cruces, New Mexico		Demolished, 2023	
Federal Correctional Institution, La Tuna (FCI, La Tuna)	1931–1932	Anthony, Texas			Trost & Trost
University of Texas at El Paso – Holliday Hall	1933	El Paso, Texas			Gustavus A. Trost
University of Texas at El Paso – Worrell Hall,	1935–1937	El Paso, Texas			Gustavus A. Trost
University of Texas at El Paso – Benedict Hall	1935–1937	El Paso, Texas			Gustavus A. Trost
El Paso Country Club – repairs	1936	El Paso, Texas			Gustavus A. Trost; 400 Camino Real; Originally proposed in 1920-1922
The Clint School	1936	Clint, Texas	Clint Junior High School		Trost & Trost; 13100 Alameda Ave.
Old Pecos Hospital – Addition	1937	Pecos, Texas			Trost & Trost
Reeves County Courthouse	1937	Pecos, Texas			Trost & Trost; 100 E. 4th St., 1937
FCI, La Tuna – Staff residences	c.1938	Anthony, Texas			Gustavus A. Trost;
Cooley School – Addition	1941	El Paso, Texas		Demolished, 1987	Gustavus A. Trost; 134 North Awbrey
J. J. Newberry Company		El Paso, Texas			Trost & Trost; NRHP
Singer Sewing Company		El Paso, Texas			Trost & Trost; NRHP, RTHL
