= National Register of Historic Places listings in El Paso County, Texas =

Location of El Paso County in Texas

This is a list of the National Register of Historic Places listings in El Paso County, Texas.

This is intended to be a complete list of properties and districts listed on the National Register of Historic Places in El Paso County, Texas. There are 15 districts, two National Historic Landmarks, 55 individual properties, and one former property listed on the National Register in the county. Two of these sites are State Historic Sites. Nine sites are also listed as Recorded Texas Historic Landmarks including three that are State Antiquities Landmarks.

This National Park Service list is complete through NPS recent listings posted August 29, 2025.

== Current listings ==
The publicly disclosed locations of National Register properties and districts may be seen in a mapping service provided.

	Name on the Register	Image	Date listed	Location	City or town	Description
1	Abdou Building	Abdou Building	September 24, 1980 (#80004100)	115 N. Mesa St. 31°45′30″N 106°29′13″W	El Paso	Commercial Structures of El Paso by Henry C. Trost Thematic Resources
2	O. T. Bassett Tower	O. T. Bassett Tower	September 24, 1980 (#80004101)	301 Texas Ave. 31°45′35″N 106°29′11″W	El Paso	Commercial Structures of El Paso by Henry C. Trost Thematic Resources
3	Richard Caples Building	Richard Caples Building	September 24, 1980 (#80004102)	300 E. San Antonio Ave. 31°45′29″N 106°29′12″W	El Paso	Commercial Structures of El Paso by Henry C. Trost Thematic Resources
4	Castner Range Archeological District	Castner Range Archeological District	April 22, 1976 (#76002021)	Address restricted	El Paso	At Castner Range National Monument
5	Chamizal National Memorial	Chamizal National Memorial	February 4, 1974 (#74002069)	Paisano Dr. 31°45′35″N 106°29′58″W	El Paso	
6	Damacio Colmenero Site		June 27, 2025 (#100008126)	Address restricted	El Paso	
7	Sgt. Doyle Site	Sgt. Doyle Site	April 11, 1977 (#77001439)	Address restricted	El Paso	
8	El Paso County Water Improvement District No. 1		August 25, 1997 (#97000885)	Starting at the jct. of US 80 and US 85, along TX 20 to Alamo Alto; 31°33′58″N 106°14′18″W	El Paso	
9	El Paso High School	El Paso High School	November 17, 1980 (#80004103)	1600 N. Virginia St. 31°46′21″N 106°29′23″W	El Paso	Recorded Texas Historic Landmark
10	El Paso Natural Gas Company (Blue Flame) Building	El Paso Natural Gas Company (Blue Flame) Building	February 13, 2018 (#100002129)	120 N Stanton; 31°45′33″N 106°29′10″W	El Paso	
11	El Paso Union Passenger Station	El Paso Union Passenger Station	April 3, 1975 (#75001970)	SW corner of Coldwell at San Francisco St. 31°45′26″N 106°29′45″W	El Paso	Recorded Texas Historic Landmark
12	El Paso US Courthouse	El Paso US Courthouse	April 25, 2001 (#01000434)	511 W. San Antonio Ave. 31°45′33″N 106°29′00″W	El Paso	
13	Elephant Butte Irrigation District		August 8, 1997 (#97000822)	Roughly along U.S. Route 85 between its junction with New Mexico State Road 90 and the El Paso city limits 32°12′58″N 106°57′31″W	Las Cruces	Extends into Doña Ana County, New Mexico and Sierra County, New Mexico
14	First Mortgage Company Building	First Mortgage Company Building	June 13, 1978 (#78002925)	109 N. Oregon St. 31°45′29″N 106°29′17″W	El Paso	
15	Fort Bliss Main Post Historic District	Fort Bliss Main Post Historic District	May 7, 1998 (#98000427)	Fort Bliss; 31°48′26″N 106°25′56″W	El Paso	
16	Fort Bliss National Cemetery	Fort Bliss National Cemetery	March 8, 2016 (#16000066)	5200 Fred Wilson Boulevard; 31°49′22″N 106°25′25″W	El Paso	
17	Franklin Canal	Franklin Canal	June 19, 1992 (#92000696)	Roughly, S of the Texas and Pacific-Southern Pacific RR tracks from western El Paso to Fabens; 31°40′21″N 106°22′35″W	El Paso	
18	Fusselman Canyon Rock Art District	Fusselman Canyon Rock Art District	June 3, 1976 (#76002022)	Address restricted	El Paso	At Castner Range National Monument
19	Trinidad Granillo Site		July 8, 2025 (#100008127)	Address restricted	El Paso	
20	W. S. Hills Commercial Structure	W. S. Hills Commercial Structure	September 24, 1980 (#80004104)	215-219 San Antonio Ave. 31°45′29″N 106°29′13″W	El Paso	
21	Hot Well Archeological Site	Hot Well Archeological Site	April 30, 1976 (#76002023)	Address restricted	El Paso	
22	Hotel Cortez	Hotel Cortez	September 24, 1980 (#80004105)	300 N. Mesa St. 31°45′35″N 106°29′14″W	El Paso	Commercial Structures of El Paso by Henry C. Trost Thematic Resources, Recorded Texas Historic Landmark
23	Hotel Paso del Norte	Hotel Paso del Norte	January 5, 1979 (#79002933)	115 El Paso St. 31°53′20″N 106°34′15″W	El Paso	Commercial Structures of El Paso by Henry C. Trost Thematic Resources
24	House at 912 Magoffin Avenue	House at 912 Magoffin Avenue	June 23, 2003 (#03000557)	912 Magoffin Ave; 31°45′41″N 106°28′43″W	El Paso	
25	Hueco Tanks	Hueco Tanks	July 14, 1971 (#71000930)	East of El Paso; 31°55′13″N 106°02′19″W	El Paso	State Historic Site (TPWD); designated a National Historic Landmark in 2021.
26	Kress Building	Kress Building	October 17, 2022 (#100008275)	211 North Mesa St. 31°45′33″N 106°29′15″W	El Paso	
27	Magoffin Historic District		October 11, 2016 (#16000717)	Roughly bounded by San Antonio, Virginia, Myrtle, and Cotton Sts. 31°45′45″N 106°28′36″W	El Paso	179 contributing buildings.
28	Magoffin Homestead	Magoffin Homestead	March 31, 1971 (#71000931)	1120 Magoffin Ave. 31°45′45″N 106°28′36″W	El Paso	State Historic Site (THC); State Antiquities Landmark; Recorded Texas Historic Landmark
29	Manhattan Heights Historic District	Manhattan Heights Historic District	September 27, 1980 (#80004107)	Roughly bounded by Grant, Louisiana and Richmond Aves. 31°47′26″N 106°27′32″W	El Paso	
30	Martin Building	Martin Building	August 8, 1984 (#84001655)	215 N. Stanton St. 31°45′35″N 106°29′11″W	El Paso	Recorded Texas Historic Landmark
31	Marrujo House		July 8, 2025 (#100008128)	Address restricted	El Paso	
32	Mesa Pump Plant		June 19, 2009 (#09000450)	4901 Fred Wilson Avenue; 31°49′35″N 106°25′43″W	El Paso	Recorded Texas Historic Landmark
33	Mills Building	Mills Building	March 21, 2011 (#11000130)	303 N. Oregon St. 31°45′33″N 106°29′21″W	El Paso	Described, but not included in Commercial Structures of El Paso by Henry C. Trost Thematic Resources due to alterations
34	Mission Socorro Archeological Site	Mission Socorro Archeological Site	January 22, 1993 (#92001741)	Address restricted	Socorro	
35	Montana Avenue Historic District	Montana Avenue Historic District	November 13, 2004 (#04001232)	1000 through 1500 Blocks of Montana Ave. 31°46′21″N 106°28′52″W	El Paso	
36	Na Hlu Hli Tui (Old Village)		September 5, 2023 (#100009300)	Address Restricted	El Paso vicinity	
37	J. J. Newberry Company	J. J. Newberry Company	September 24, 1980 (#80004108)	201-205 N. Stanton St. 31°45′33″N 106°29′10″W	El Paso	Commercial Structures of El Paso by Henry C. Trost Thematic Resources
38	Northgate Site	Northgate Site	March 16, 1972 (#72001356)	Address restricted	El Paso	At Castner Range National Monument
39	Old Bnai Zion Synagogue	Old Bnai Zion Synagogue	August 16, 1984 (#84001658)	906 N. El Paso St. 31°45′37″N 106°29′22″W	El Paso	State Antiquities Landmark; Recorded Texas Historic Landmark
40	Old Fort Bliss	Old Fort Bliss	February 23, 1972 (#72001357)	1800 block of Doniphan St. 31°45′47″N 106°30′33″W	El Paso	Recorded Texas Historic Landmark
41	Old San Francisco Historic District	Old San Francisco Historic District	May 21, 1985 (#85001132)	Missouri St. between No. 325 and 527; 31°45′33″N 106°29′39″W	El Paso	
42	Palace Theatre	Palace Theatre	September 24, 1980 (#80004109)	209 S. El Paso St. 31°45′25″N 106°29′19″W	El Paso	Alhambra Theatre, Commercial Structures of El Paso by Henry C. Trost Thematic Resources
43	Patterson Apartments		January 19, 2022 (#100007381)	1217 North Mesa St. 31°46′00″N 106°29′39″W	El Paso	
44	Plaza Hotel	Plaza Hotel	September 24, 1980 (#80004110)	Oregon and Mills Sts. 31°45′31″N 106°29′18″W	El Paso	Commercial Structures of El Paso by Henry C. Trost Thematic Resources
45	Plaza Theatre	Plaza Theatre	June 4, 1987 (#87000902)	125 Pioneer Plaza; 31°45′31″N 106°29′11″W	El Paso	
46	Popular Department Store	Popular Department Store	September 24, 1980 (#80004111)	102 N. Mesa St. 31°45′30″N 106°29′10″W	El Paso	Commercial Structures of El Paso by Henry C. Trost Thematic Resources
47	Presidio Chapel of San Elizario	Presidio Chapel of San Elizario	September 14, 1972 (#72001358)	S side of plaza 31°35′05″N 106°16′22″W	San Elizario	Recorded Texas Historic Landmark
48	Quarters Number 1	Quarters Number 1	April 9, 1987 (#87000484)	228 Sheridan Rd. 31°48′29″N 106°26′15″W	Fort Bliss	
49	Rio Grande Avenue Historic District		September 9, 1999 (#99001140)	Roughly bounded by Rio Grande, Navada, Kansas, and Campbell Sts. 31°46′10″N 106°29′14″W	El Paso	
50	Rio Vista Bracero Reception Center	Rio Vista Bracero Reception Center	December 11, 2023 (#100009831)	800-860 and 901 North Rio Vista Road; 31°39′41″N 106°15′59″W	Socorro	A subset of the Rio Vista Farm Historic District.
51	Rio Vista Farm Historic District	Rio Vista Farm Historic District	February 22, 1996 (#96000131)	800-801 Rio Vista Rd. 31°39′41″N 106°15′52″W	Socorro	
52	Roberts-Banner Building	Roberts-Banner Building	September 24, 1980 (#80004112)	215 N. Mesa St. 31°45′32″N 106°29′14″W	El Paso	Commercial Structures of El Paso by Henry C. Trost Thematic Resources
53	Salida de los Santos Site		July 8, 2025 (#100008130)	Address restricted	El Paso	
54	San Elizario Historic District	San Elizario Historic District	February 27, 1997 (#97000205)	Roughly bounded by Rio Grande St., Socorro and Convent Rds., and the San Elizario Lateral; 31°35′07″N 106°16′21″W	San Elizario	
55	Segundo Barrio Historic District		November 3, 2021 (#100006994)	Roughly Bounded by South Santa Fe St., South Oregon St., East 9th Ave., Cotton St., Paisano Dr., and East Father Rahm Ave. 31°45′14″N 106°28′52″W	El Paso	
56	Ray Sherman Place		March 25, 2019 (#100003534)	4528 Blanco Ave. 31°45′55″N 106°26′11″W	El Paso	
57	Silver Dollar Cafe	Silver Dollar Cafe	August 14, 1986 (#86002618)	1021 S. Mesa; 31°44′58″N 106°29′02″W	El Paso	
58	Singer Sewing Company	Singer Sewing Company	September 24, 1980 (#80004113)	211 Texas Ave. 31°45′33″N 106°29′12″W	El Paso	Commercial Structures of El Paso by Henry C. Trost Thematic Resources, Recorded Texas Historic Landmark
59	Socorro Mission	Socorro Mission	March 16, 1972 (#72001359)	Moon Rd. and TX 258; 31°39′30″N 106°18′09″W	Socorro	State Antiquities Landmark; Recorded Texas Historic Landmark
60	State National Bank	State National Bank	September 24, 1980 (#80004114)	114 E. San Antonio Ave. 31°45′27″N 106°29′15″W	El Paso	Commercial Structures of El Paso by Henry C. Trost Thematic Resources
61	Sunset Heights Historic District	Sunset Heights Historic District	December 8, 1988 (#88002672)	Roughly bounded by Heisig Ave., River Ave., N. El Paso St., and I-10; 31°45′47″N 106°29′53″W	El Paso	
62	Tays Place		March 25, 2019 (#100003535)	2114 E. Magoffin Ave. 31°46′11″N 106°27′52″W	El Paso	
63	Toltec Club	Toltec Club	March 12, 1979 (#79002934)	602 Magoffin Ave. 31°45′33″N 106°28′56″W	El Paso	
64	Henry C. Trost House	Henry C. Trost House	July 12, 1976 (#76002024)	1013 W. Yandell Dr. 31°45′52″N 106°29′58″W	El Paso	
65	U.S. Post Office	U.S. Post Office	July 19, 1984 (#84001662)	219 Mills Ave. 31°45′36″N 106°29′13″W	El Paso	
66	White House Department Store and Hotel McCoy	White House Department Store and Hotel McCoy	September 24, 1980 (#80004115)	109 Pioneer Plaza; 31°45′32″N 106°29′19″W	El Paso	Commercial Structures of El Paso by Henry C. Trost Thematic Resources
67	Women's Club	Women's Club	July 22, 1979 (#79002935)	1400 N. Mesa St. 31°46′02″N 106°29′40″W	El Paso	Recorded Texas Historic Landmark
68	Ysleta del Sur Pueblo Hueco Mountain Property		July 9, 2025 (#100008133)	Address restricted	El Paso	
69	Ysleta del Sur Pueblo Iye-Kitu (Corn Village) Housing District		July 9, 2025 (#100008132)	Address restricted	El Paso	
70	Ysleta del Sur Pueblo Tuhla District		July 8, 2025 (#100008129)	Address restricted	El Paso	
71	Ysleta Mission	Ysleta Mission	July 31, 1972 (#72001360)	TX 20 near jct. with Zaragosa Rd. 31°41′27″N 106°19′38″W	Ysleta	Recorded Texas Historic Landmark

== Former listings ==
	Name on the Register	Image	Date listed	Date removed	Location	City or town	Description
1	1800s Mexican Consulate		May 23, 1975 (#75001969)	December 3, 2013	612 E. San Antonio St. 31°45′33″N 106°28′58″W	El Paso	Demolished.

== See also ==
- National Register of Historic Places listings in Texas
- List of Texas State Historic Sites
- Recorded Texas Historic Landmarks in El Paso County
