= Temple San Ignacio de Loyola =

El Paso, TX church designed by Trost & Trost

Coordinates: 31°45′27″N 106°28′32″W

Temple San Ignacio de Loyola is a Catholic church building that is in El Paso, Texas. The current church was designed and executed from 1913 to 1922 by Gustavus A. Trost, of the Trost & Trost architectural and engineering company. The building is still in use, as of late 2023, and is part of the Diocese of El Paso.

== History ==
The project was headed by Gustavus A. Trost, under the mentorship of Henry C. Trost, both employed at the award-winning Trost & Trost firm. It was one of Gustavus' first endeavors for the firm as a practicing architect. The original church had been constructed in 1905. It underwent a remodel with final design planning approved in 1912, and with an initial annual budget of $22,000 starting in 1913. Over the ensuing decade—beginning in 1913—Trost & Trost built additions to the church, and remodeled the existing facade and towers, completing the project in 1922. The new design featured external brick walls, the installation of a heating system; expanded wooden towers with metal-clad cupolas, and tin roofing. The remodeled church was dedicated on April 2, 1922.

The central portion of the facade contains a general resemblance to the foundling hospital in Florence, Italy. Gustavus Trost had traveled extensively to Italy and had made detailed sketches of the hospital's interior for later study and use. (Note: The Florence foundling hospital was founded and construction begun on it in 1419. It was designed by the architect, Filippo Brunelleschi.)

== Parish details ==
Today, the parish offers weekend bilingual and Spanish services held in the church. It is part of the Roman Catholic St. Ignatius de Loyola parish of El Paso.

== See also ==
- List of Trost & Trost works
- St. Ignatius de Loyola
