= J. J. Newberry Company =

- Newberry, J. J., Company
- U.S. National Register of Historic Places
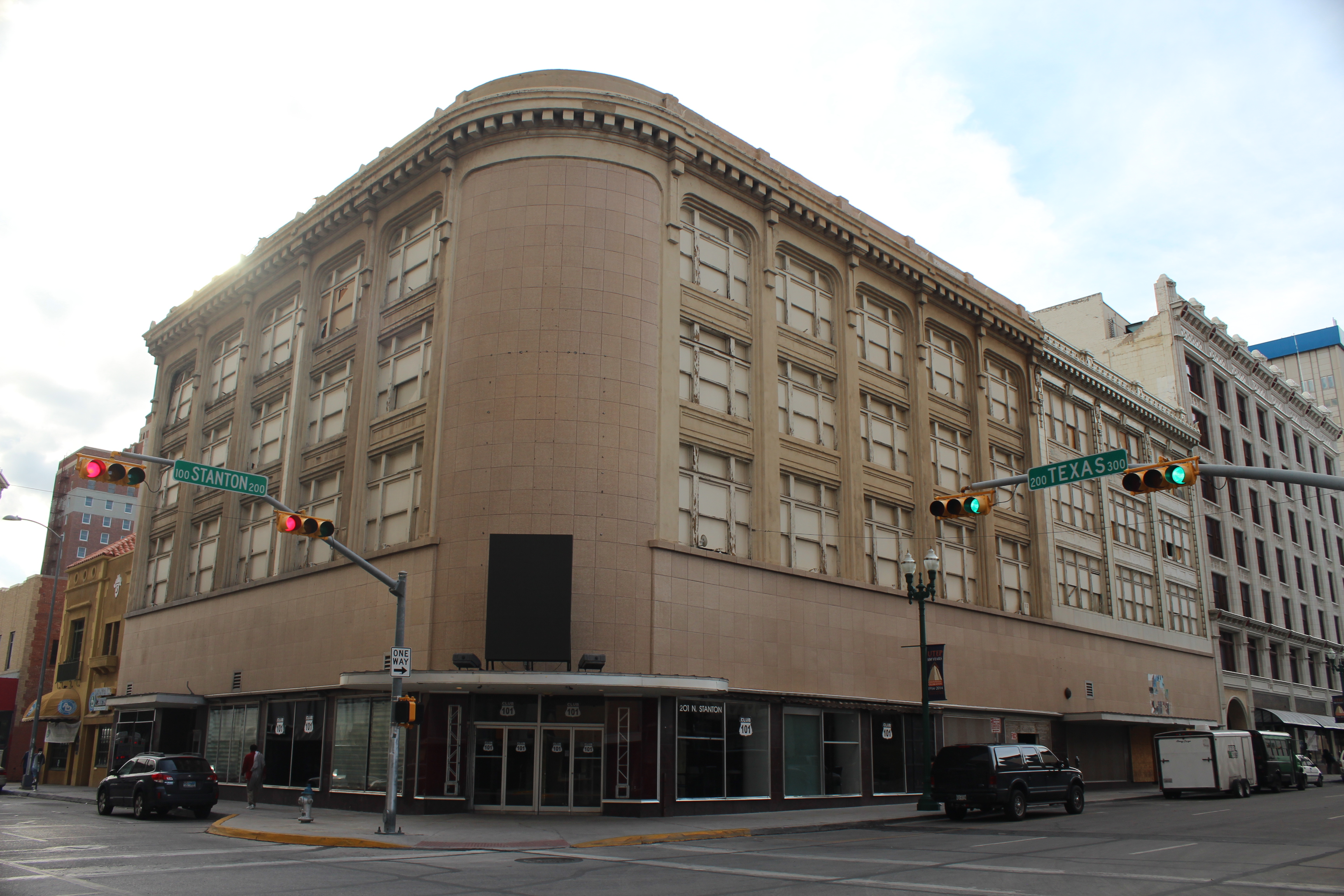
- The building in 2014

- Location within Texas Location within the United States
- Location: 201--205 North Stanton Street, El Paso, Texas
- Coordinates: 31°45′33″N 106°29′10″W
- Area: less than one acre
- Built: 1911
- Built by: J. Calisher Realty Company
- Architect: Trost & Trost
- Architectural style: Chicago Style
- MPS: Commercial Structures of El Paso by Henry C. Trost TR
- NRHP reference No.: 80004108
- Added to NRHP: September 24, 1980

J. J. Newberry Company is a historic five-story building in El Paso, Texas, United States. It was built by the J. Calisher Realty Company in 1911, and it was known as Calisher's. The Calisher company was a store first opened in El Paso in 1881. Early tenants included the YMCA (on the two top floors) and the Border National Bank. It was later renamed for the J.J. Newberry, a five and dime store chain. The building was designed in the Chicago School architectural style by Trost & Trost. It has been listed on the National Register of Historic Places since September 24, 1980.
