= Singer Sewing Company Building =

Historic building in El Paso, Texas

- Singer Sewing Company
- U.S. National Register of Historic Places
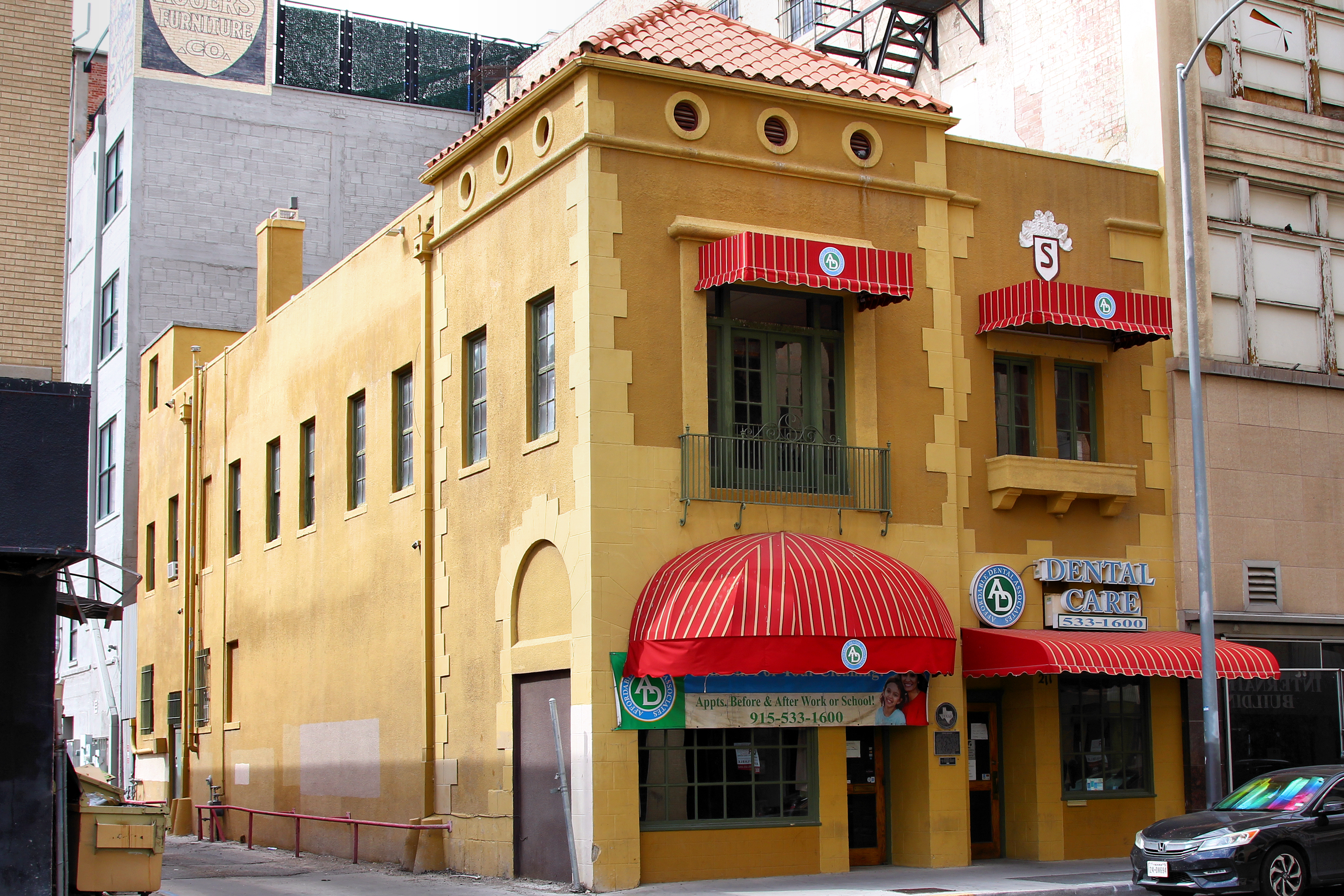

- Location within Texas Location within the United States
- Location: 211 Texas Avenue, El Paso, Texas
- Coordinates: 31°45′33″N 106°29′12″W
- Area: less than one acre
- Built: 1928
- Built by: H.T. Pons Ford & Sons
- Architect: Trost & Trost
- Architectural style: Spanish Colonial Revival
- MPS: Commercial Structures of El Paso by Henry C. Trost TR
- NRHP reference No.: 80004113
- Added to NRHP: September 24, 1980

The Singer Sewing Company Building is a historic building in El Paso, Texas. It was built in 1928 for the Singer Corporation on land formerly owned by Ervin H. Schwartz, Manuel Schwartz, and I. Weiss. It was designed in the Spanish Colonial Revival architectural style by Trost & Trost. It has been on the National Register of Historic Places since September 24, 1980.
