= Alhambra Theatre (El Paso, Texas) =

- Palace Theatre
- U.S. National Register of Historic Places
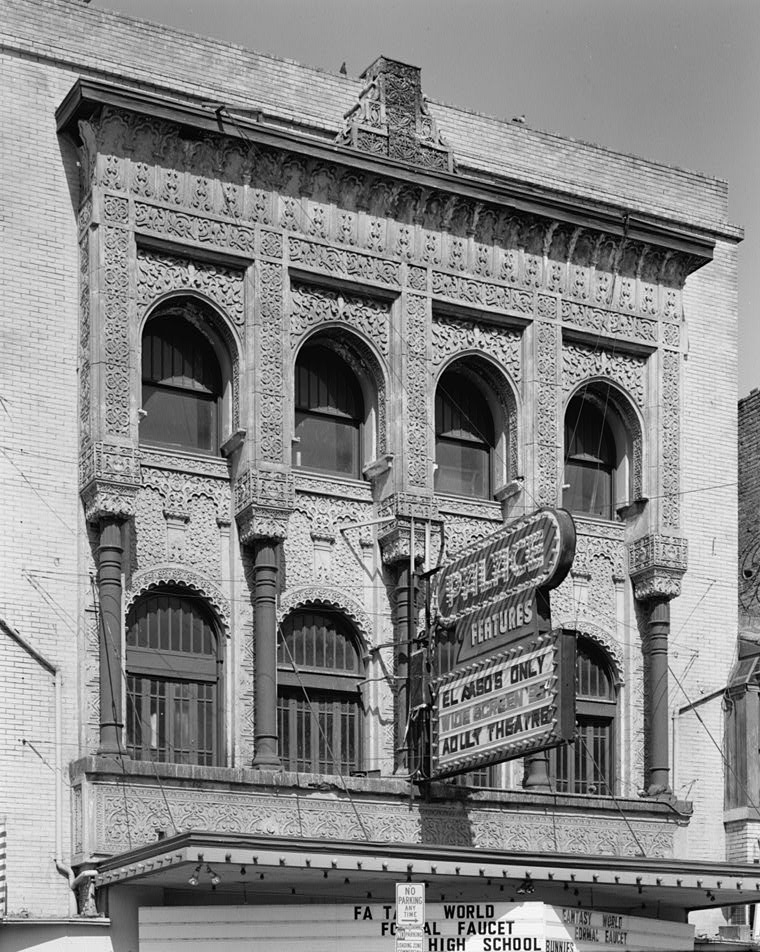
- Photo of the Alhambra Theatre taken as part of the Historic American Buildings Survey

- Location within Texas Location within the United States
- Location: 209 S. El Paso St., El Paso, Texas
- Coordinates: 31°45′25″N 106°29′19″W
- Area: less than one acre
- Built: 1914
- Architect: Trost & Trost
- Architectural style: Spanish Colonial Revival
- MPS: Commercial Structures of El Paso by Henry C. Trost TR
- NRHP reference No.: 80004109
- Added to NRHP: September 24, 1980

The Alhambra Theatre, also known as the Palace Theatre, is a building in El Paso, Texas. Opened on August 1, 1914, the building was designed by architect Henry C. Trost in the Spanish Colonial Revival style with a Moorish theme, preceding spread of the Moorish Revival style of the 1920s. The building cost $150,000. It was prepared to serve either as a playhouse for live theater or as a movie house, and included a large organ to be played with silent movies of the day.

== See also ==
- National Register of Historic Places listings in El Paso County, Texas
