= Rio Vista Bracero Reception Center =

Historic Landmark in Texas, United States

- U.S. National Register of Historic Places
- U.S. National Historic Landmark
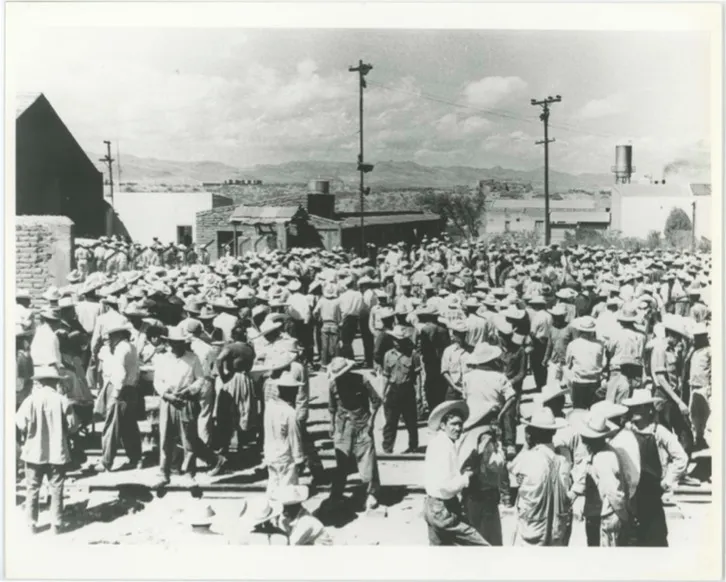
- Mexican Braceros at the Rio Vista Reception Center
- Location: 800-860 and 901 North Rio Vista Road, Socorro, Texas
- Area: 14 acres (5.7 ha)
- NRHP reference No.: 100009831
- Added to NRHP: December 11, 2023

Rio Vista Bracero Reception Center is a historic farm site in Socorro, Texas, that served orphaned children and homeless adults of mostly Hispanic descent. The farm was created in 1915, as the El Paso Poor Farm. During the Great Depression the population grew and a variety of public welfare programs became available to farm residents. During this time through World War II, the farm was renamed Rio Vista and large numbers of neglected children were housed there. From 1950 to 1964 the farm served as a processing center for the Bracero Program which brought Mexicans to the United States as guest agricultural workers. The site was the first permanent reception center for braceros.

Rio Vista Farm took on a new role when part of it became a training academy for the El Paso County Sheriff's Office. After that time, the building which had been the farm's main building became The Rio Vista Recreation Center while most of the rest of the farm went unused and its buildings began to deteriorate. In 2015, it was added to the Preservation Texas' list of endangered places.

It was named a National Historic Landmark by U.S. Secretary of the Interior Deb Haaland, on December 11, 2023. The Rio Vista Farm buildings and surrounding fields in Socorro, TX are included in the Historic Landmark district. In September 2024, Socorro’s City Council approved funding to build a bracero museum on the site. Along with building a museum facility, the city plans to raise $35 million to complete the restoration project to restore buildings on the site which have fallen into disrepair. This project has already received about $1 million from Congress and a $750,000 Mellon Foundation grant.

== See also ==
- List of National Historic Landmarks in Texas
- List of Texas State Historic Sites
- National Register of Historic Places in El Paso County, Texas
- Recorded Texas Historic Landmarks in El Paso County
