= Popular Department Store =

- U.S. National Register of Historic Places
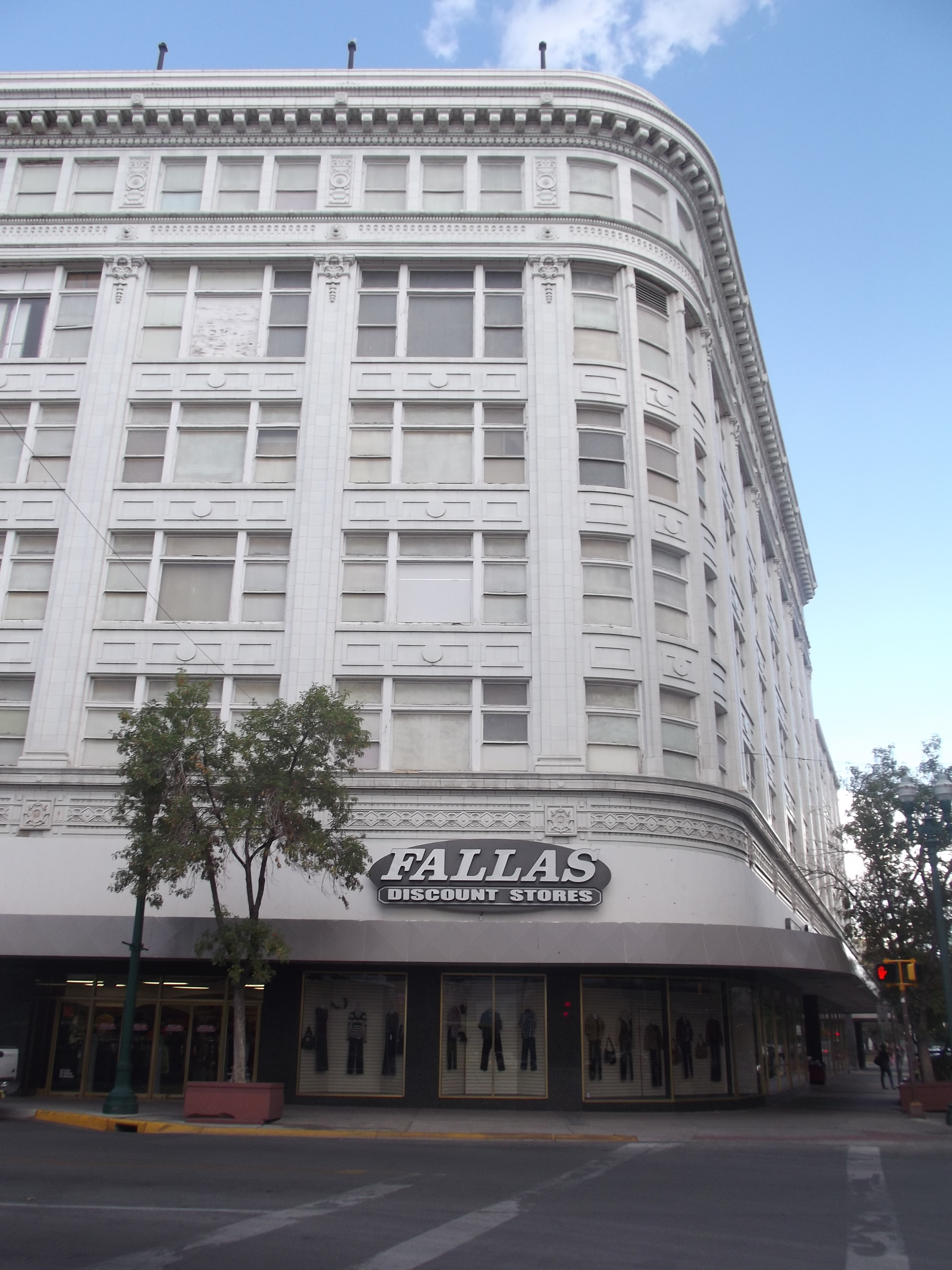
- The building in 2012

- Location within Texas Location within the United States
- Location: 102 North Mesa Street, El Paso, Texas
- Coordinates: 31°45′30″N 106°29′10″W
- Area: less than one acre
- Built: 1917
- Architect: Trost & Trost
- Architectural style: Chicago
- MPS: Commercial Structures of El Paso by Henry C. Trost TR
- NRHP reference No.: 80004111
- Added to NRHP: September 24, 1980

The Popular Department Store is a historic building in El Paso, Texas. It was built in 1917 for The Popular, a chain of department stores founded by Adolph Schwartz in El Paso in 1902. His heirs inherited the building, and they sold it in 1995; it later became the Fallas Department Store. The building was designed in the Chicago School architectural style by Trost & Trost. It has been listed on the National Register of Historic Places since September 24, 1980.
