= U.S. Post Office (El Paso) =

- U.S. National Register of Historic Places
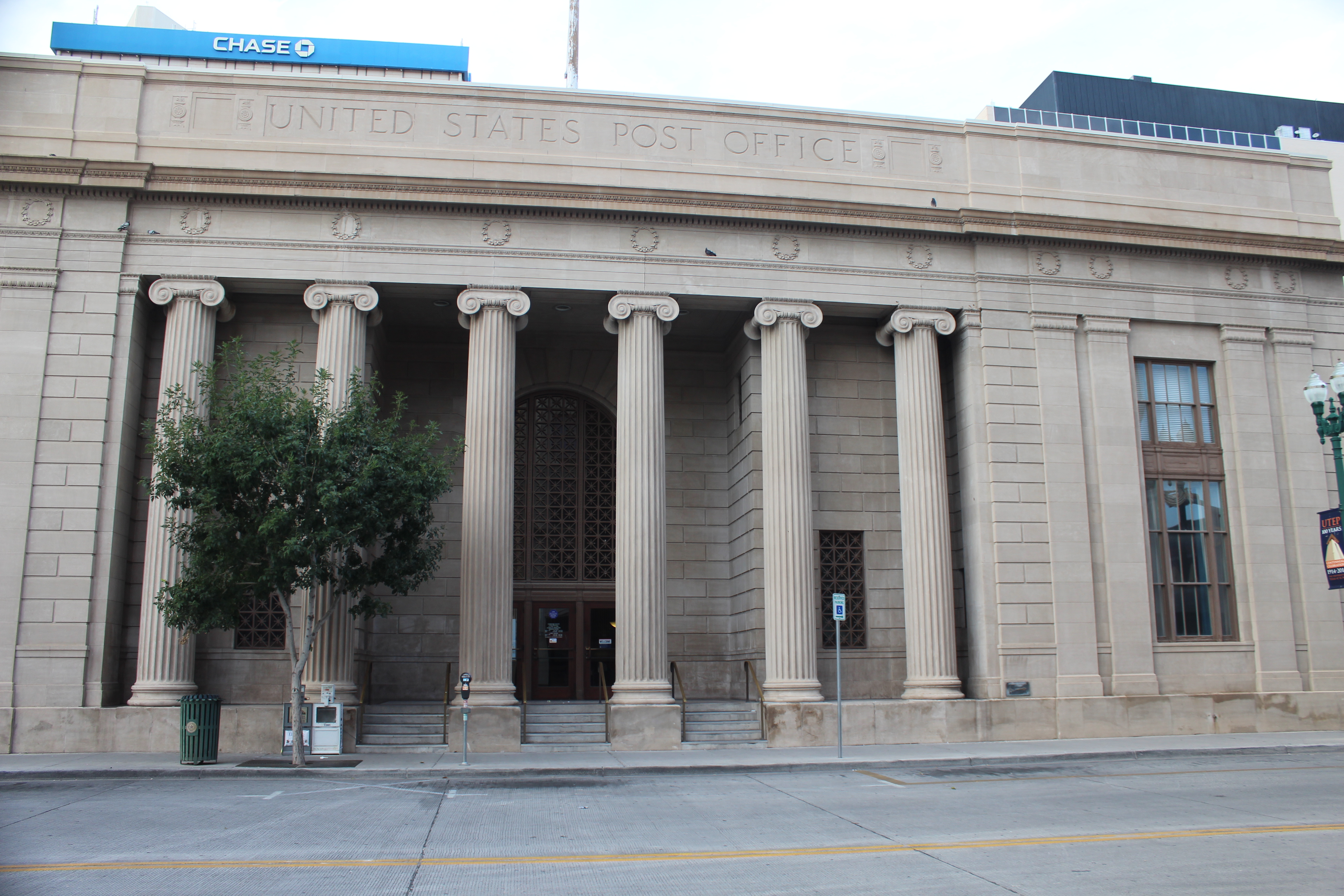
- The building in 2014

- Location within Texas Location within the United States
- Location: 219 Mills Avenue, El Paso, Texas
- Coordinates: 31°45′36″N 106°29′13″W
- Area: less than one acre
- Built: 1916
- Built by: Rowland Gilchrist
- Architectural style: Beaux Arts
- NRHP reference No.: 84001662
- Added to NRHP: July 19, 1984

The U.S. Post Office is a historic building in El Paso, Texas. It was built in 1916, and designed in the Beaux Arts architectural style. The lobby is "topped by a massive, paneled, saucer-shaped dome", and the rest of the lobby includes "polished marble" and "huge, rounded, ornamental grills of bronze." The building has been listed on the National Register of Historic Places since July 19, 1984.
