= House at 912 Magoffin Avenue =

- U.S. National Register of Historic Places
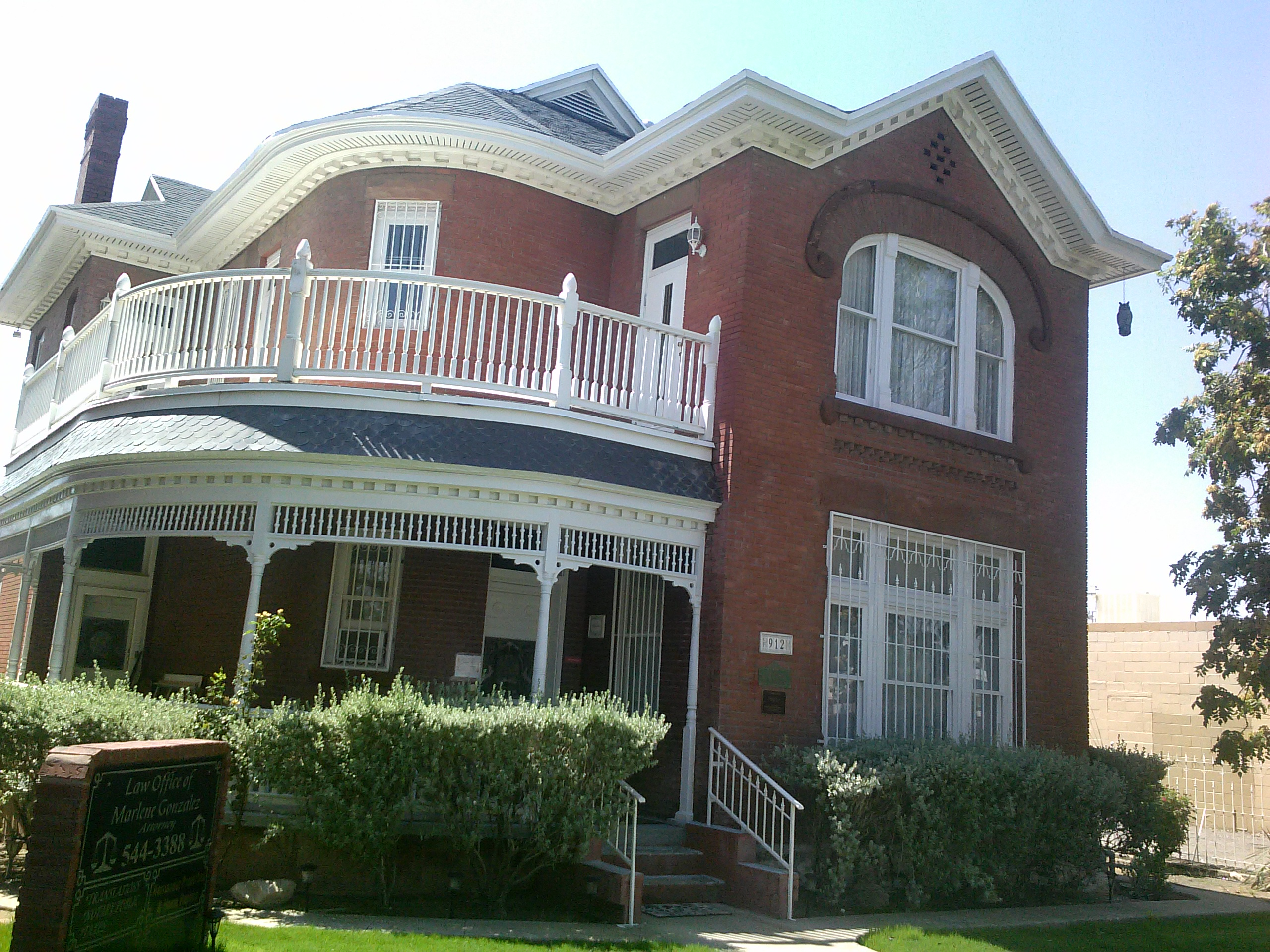
- The house in 2015

- Location within Texas Location within the United States
- Location: 912 Magoffin Avenue, El Paso, Texas
- Coordinates: 31°45′41″N 106°28′43″W
- Area: less than one acre
- Built: 1904
- Architectural style: Queen Anne
- NRHP reference No.: 03000557
- Added to NRHP: June 23, 2003

The House at 912 Magoffin Avenue is a historic house in El Paso, Texas. It was built first built as a two-story house in 1898 where a one-story house once stood. It was redesigned in 1903–1905 in the Queen Anne architectural style. It was the home of Margaret Conerton, an Irish immigrant who died in the house in 1908. By 1935, it belonged to the Stubbs family. It has been listed on the National Register of Historic Places since June 23, 2003.
