= Old Fort Bliss =

- Old Fort Bliss (Camp Bliss)
- U.S. National Register of Historic Places
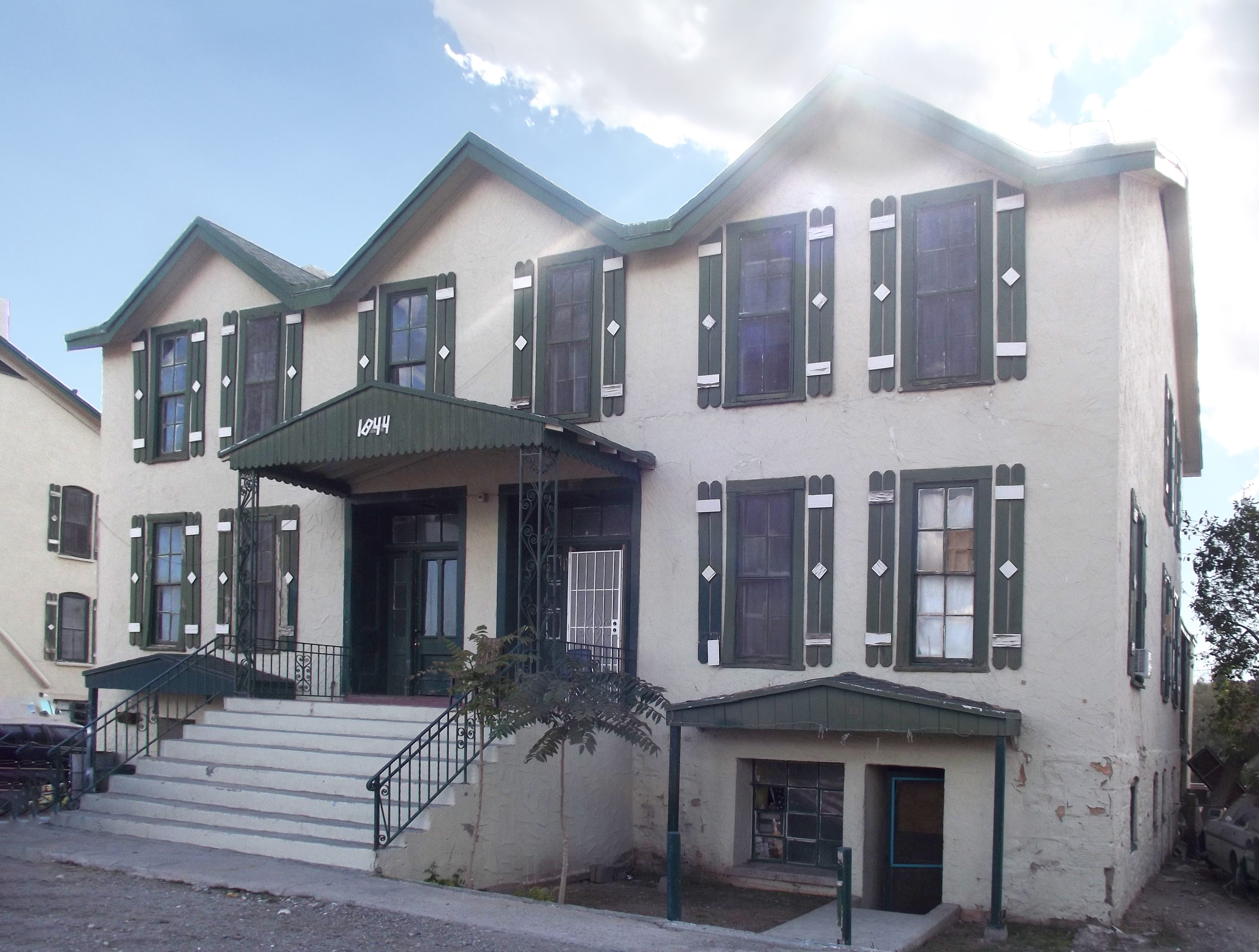
- One of the buildings in 2012

- Location within Texas Location within the United States
- Location: 1800 block of Doniphan Street, El Paso, Texas
- Coordinates: 31°45′47″N 106°30′33″W
- Area: 11 acres (4.5 ha)
- Built: 1851
- NRHP reference No.: 72001357
- Added to NRHP: February 23, 1972

Old Fort Bliss, also referred to as Camp Bliss, are a pair of two-story adobe buildings in El Paso, Texas. They were built in the 1850s, and designed in the Victorian architectural style. They were army barracks and later remodelled into apartment buildings. The structure has been listed on the National Register of Historic Places since February 23, 1972. In 2017, the structure was endangered.
