= Old Bnai Zion Synagogue =

- U.S. National Register of Historic Places
- Texas State Antiquities Landmark
- Recorded Texas Historic Landmark
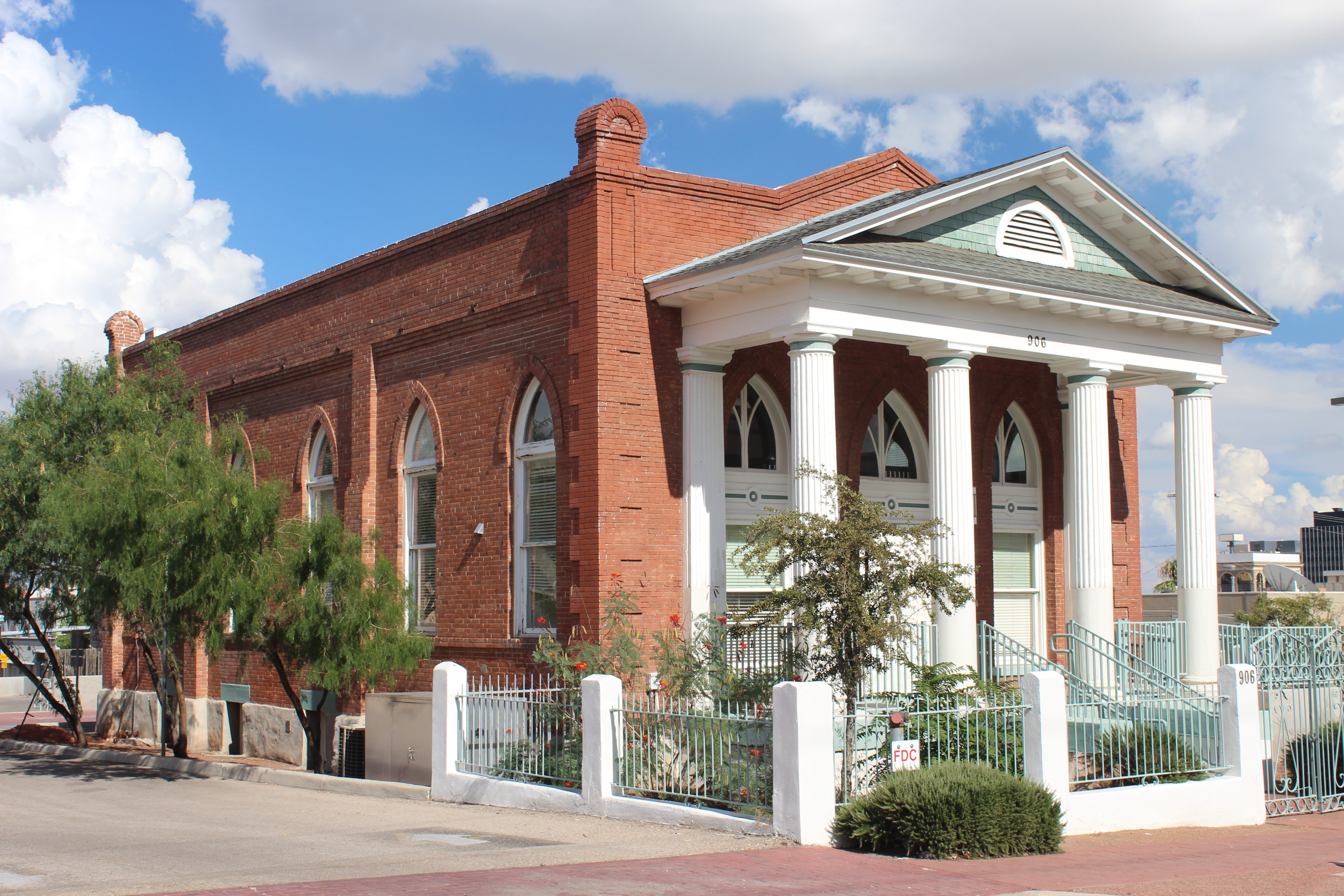
- Old Bnai Zion Synagogue

- Location within Texas Location within the United States
- Location: 906 North El Paso Street, El Paso, Texas
- Coordinates: 31°45′37″N 106°29′22″W
- Area: less than one acre
- Built: 1912
- Architectural style: Greek Revival, Late Gothic Revival
- NRHP reference No.: 84001658
- TSAL No.: 8200000231
- RTHL No.: 3688

Significant dates
- Added to NRHP: August 16, 1984
- Designated TSAL: April 25, 1984
- Designated RTHL: 1984

Old Bnai Zion Synagogue, also known as Sunset Palace, is a historic synagogue at 906 North El Paso Street in El Paso, Texas. It was built in 1916 and added to the National Register in 1984.

It served as synagogue from 1912 to 1917, serving El Paso's first Jewish community. It served St. Nicholas Greek Church from 1927 through at least 1934. In 1984 it was serving as a dance studio, Sunset Palace, as well as sometimes as a social center and church.

== See also ==
- National Register of Historic Places listings in El Paso County, Texas
- Recorded Texas Historic Landmarks in El Paso County
