= Martin Building (El Paso, Texas) =

- U.S. National Register of Historic Places
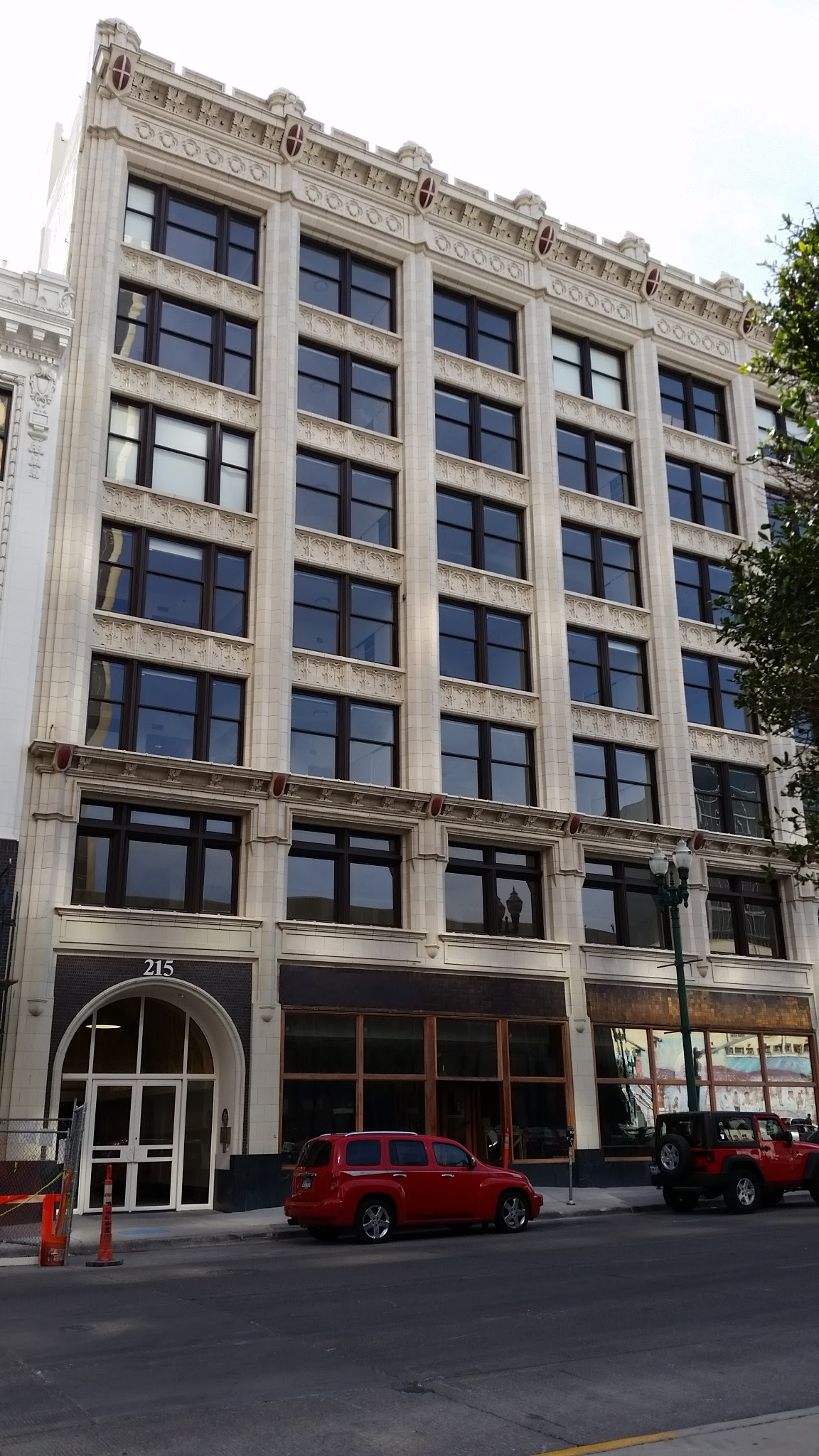
- The building in 2016

- Location within Texas Location within the United States
- Location: 215 North Stanton Street, El Paso, Texas
- Coordinates: 31°45′35″N 106°29′11″W
- Area: less than one acre
- Built: 1916
- Architect: Brauhton & Leibert
- NRHP reference No.: 84001655
- Added to NRHP: August 8, 1984

The Martin Building is a historic seven-story building in El Paso, Texas. It is 25.91 metre high. Built in 1916–1917, it was initially an office building for M.D. Roberts and William Martin Banner. From 1950 to 1979, it belonged to the El Paso Electric Company. It was acquired by Lane Gaddy in 2011 and converted into residential apartments in 2016.

The building was designed in the Chicago School architectural style by Brauhton and Leibert. It has been listed on the National Register of Historic Places since August 8, 1984.

The city of El Paso added a historical plaque in 2018.
