= First Mortgage Company Building =

- First Mortage Company Building
- U.S. National Register of Historic Places
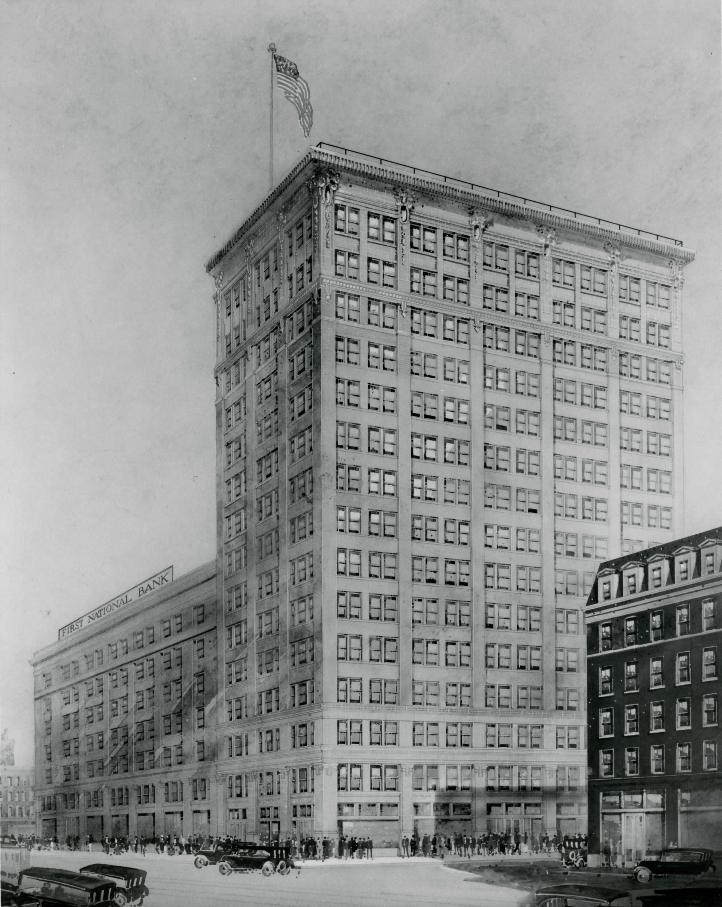

- Location within Texas Location within the United States
- Location: 109 North Oregon Street, El Paso, Texas
- Coordinates: 31°45′29″N 106°29′17″W
- Area: less than one acre
- Built: 1921
- Architect: Barglebaugh & Whitson
- NRHP reference No.: 78002925
- Added to NRHP: June 13, 1978

The First Mortgage Company Building is a historic fifteen-story building in El Paso, Texas. It was built for the First Mortgage Company in 1921, at a cost of $411,000. El Paso was going through a construction boom at the time, and it was the largest structure with the El Paso Scottish Rite Temple. It has been listed on the National Register of Historic Places since June 13, 1978.
