= Toltec Club =

- U.S. National Register of Historic Places
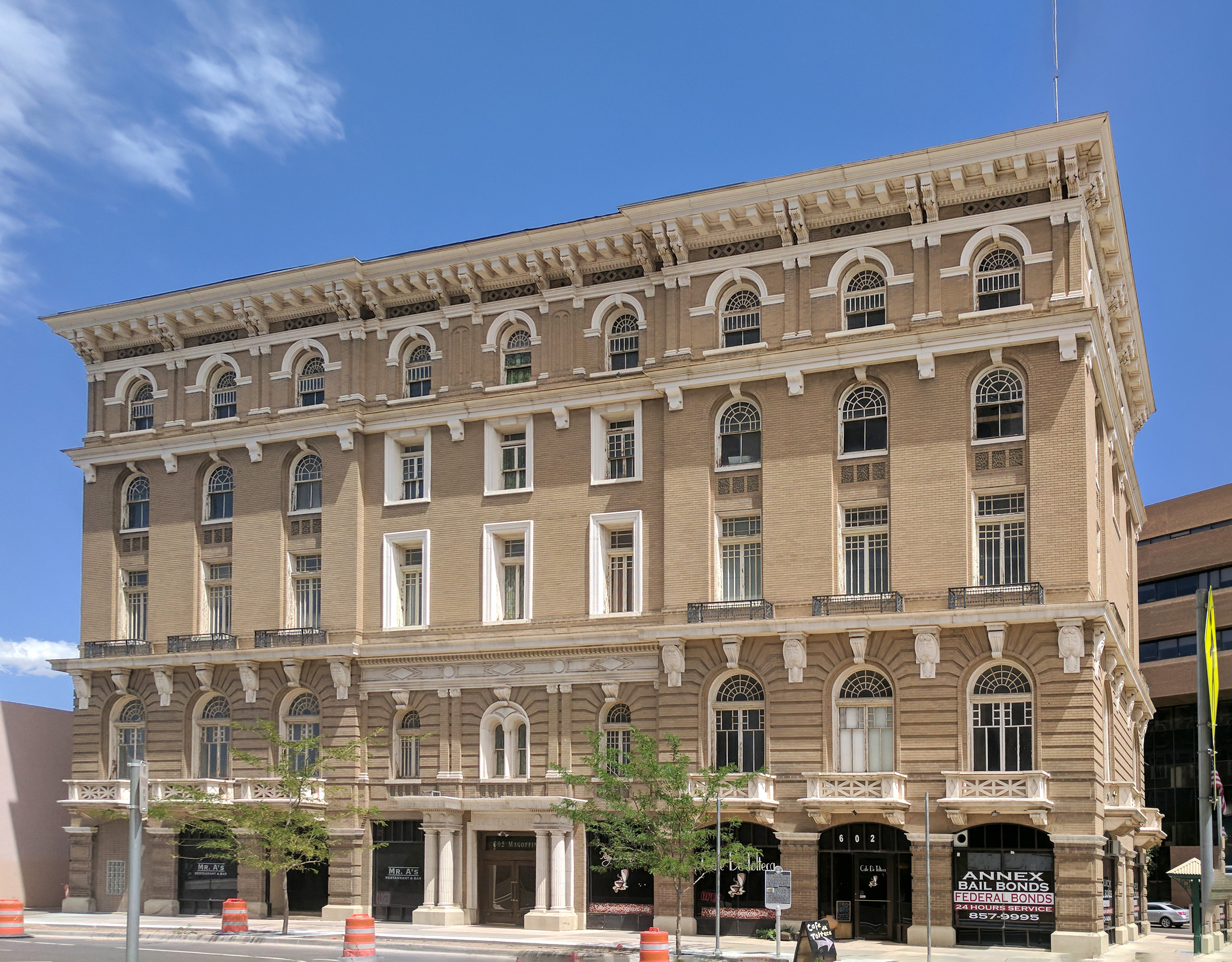

- Location within Texas Location within the United States
- Location: 602 Magoffin Ave. El Paso, Texas
- Coordinates: 31°45′36″N 106°28′45″W
- Area: less than one acre
- Built: 1910
- Architect: John J. Huddart
- Architectural style: Renaissance, Beaux Arts
- NRHP reference No.: 79002934
- Added to NRHP: March 12, 1979

The Toltec Club (or Toltec Building) is a building located in downtown El Paso, Texas. The building was added to the National Register of Historic Places in 1979.

== History ==
The Toltec Club purchased the land for the building on December 12, 1908. The all-men's club was founded by W.H. Burges, T.M. Wingo, Felix Martinez, W.W. Turney A.P. Coles, Britton Davis, J. Arthur Eddy and C.B Eddy on November 18, 1902. The name, "Toltec," meant "man of knowledge."

The Toltec Club building was opened in 1910 and cost about $100,000. The architect for the building was John J. Huddart. The grand opening took place on October 14, 1910, with a colorful, "informal" reception, according to the El Paso Herald.

Initiation fees for the club were expensive at $100 and club dues cost $50. Important visitors in El Paso were often entertained at the club which had a ballroom and high stakes gambling.

The Great Depression affected the club, causing it to close in 1930.

== See also ==
- National Register of Historic Places listings in El Paso County, Texas
