= Fort Bliss Main Post Historic District =

- U.S. National Register of Historic Places
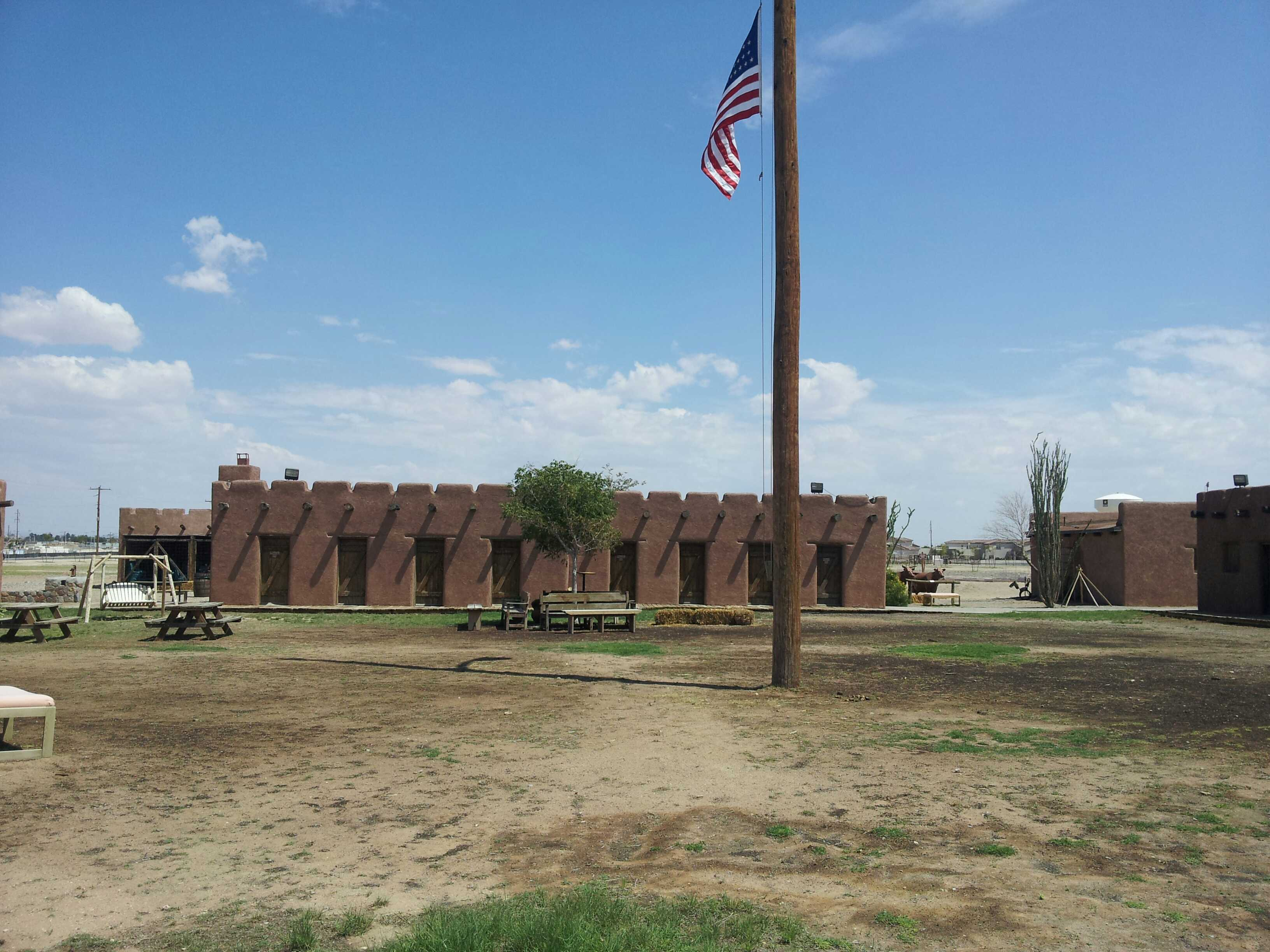

- Location within Texas Location within the United States
- Location: Fort Bliss, El Paso, Texas
- Coordinates: 31°48′26″N 106°25′56″W
- Area: 339 acres (137 ha)
- Built: 1893
- Built by: US Army
- Architectural style: Queen Anne, Colonial Revival, Greek Revival, Mission/Spanish Revival
- NRHP reference No.: 98000427
- Added to NRHP: May 7, 1998

The Fort Bliss Main Post Historic District, at Fort Bliss in El Paso, Texas, is a 339 acres (137 ha) historic district which was listed on the National Register of Historic Places in 1998. The listing included 343 contributing buildings, two contributing structures, and a contributing site on the Fort Bliss military installation.

During the initial construction of Fort Bliss, during 1891–1899, 27 buildings were built that survive and are counted as contributing buildings in the district, of which 16 are notable for their architecture. These include examples of Queen Anne, Colonial Revival, and Greek Revival architecture. An example is Building 8, a two-story hospital building.

There is also Mission Revival present on the base.
