= Henry C. Trost House =

- U.S. National Register of Historic Places
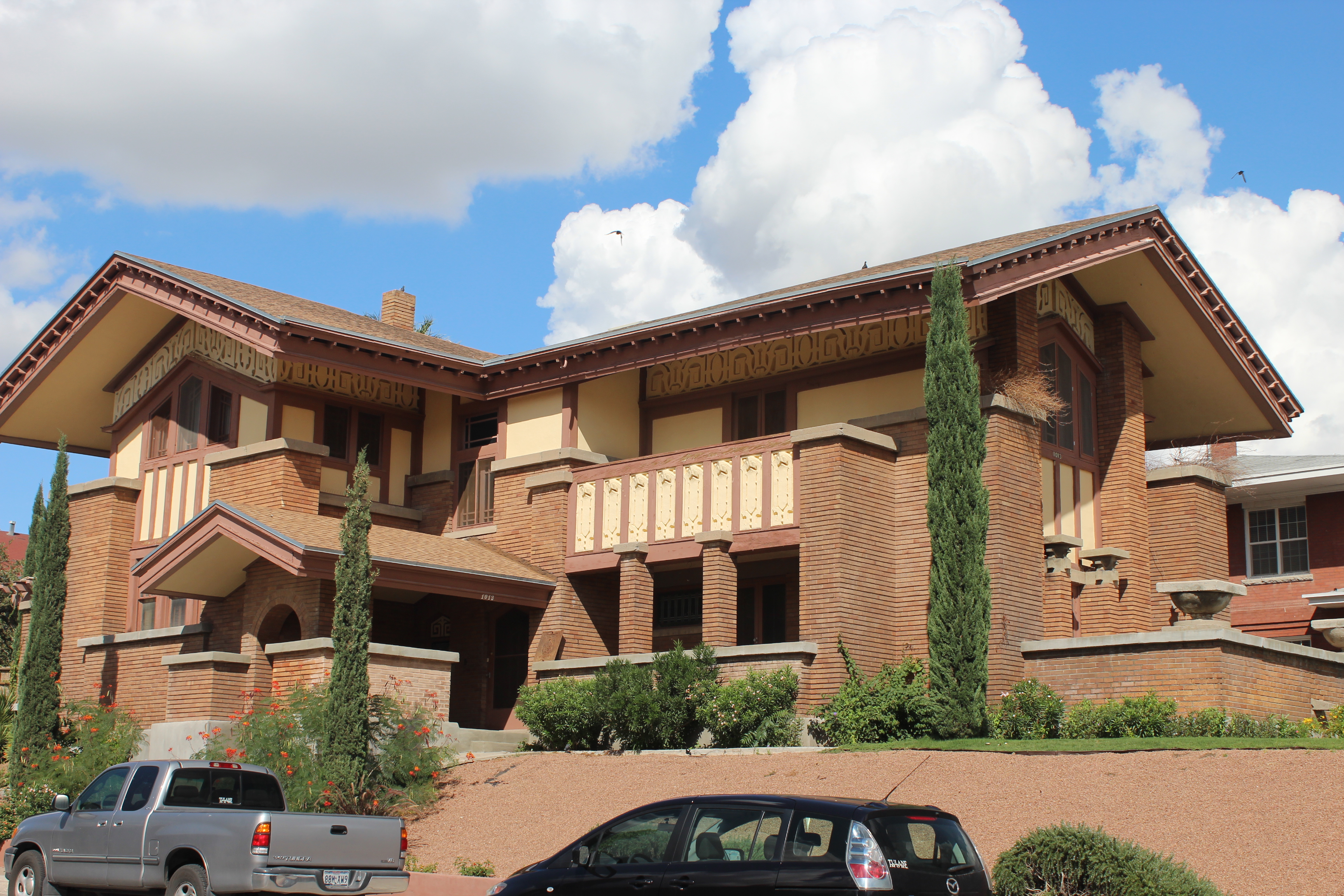
- The house in 2014

- Location within Texas Location within the United States
- Location: 1013 West Yandell Drive, El Paso, Texas
- Coordinates: 31°45′52″N 106°29′58″W
- Area: less than one acre
- Built: 1908
- Architect: Henry C. Trost
- Architectural style: Prairie School, Sullivanesque
- NRHP reference No.: 76002024
- Added to NRHP: July 12, 1976

The Henry C. Trost House is a historic house in El Paso, Texas. It was built in 1908-1909 for architect Henry C. Trost of Trost & Trost, who designed it. Trost lived here with his siblings: two brothers and a sister. It was purchased by the Grossbeck in 1948, and it was later acquired by Robert McGregor, who teaches at El Paso Community College. The house has been listed on the National Register of Historic Places since July 12, 1976.
