= Abdou Building =

- U.S. National Register of Historic Places
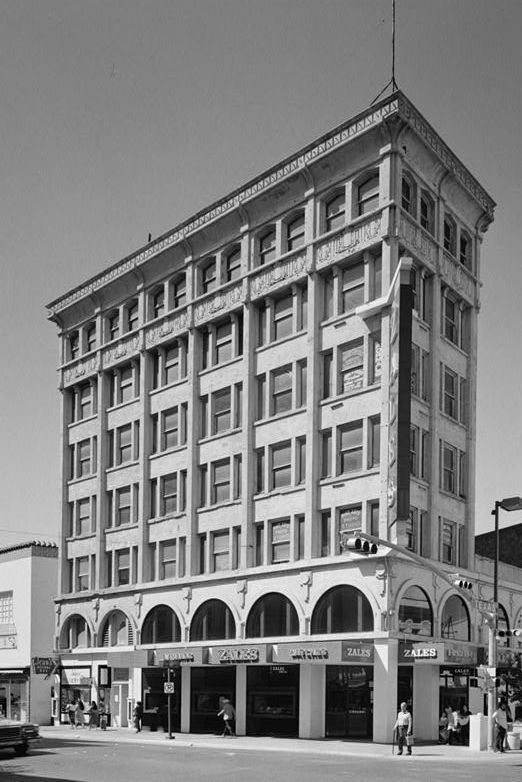

- Location within Texas Location within the United States
- Location: 115 North Mesa Street, El Paso, Texas
- Coordinates: 31°45′30″N 106°29′13″W
- Area: less than one acre
- Built: 1910
- Architect: Trost & Trost
- Architectural style: 20th century skyscraper
- MPS: Commercial Structures of El Paso by Henry C. Trost TR
- NRHP reference No.: 80004100
- Added to NRHP: September 24, 1980

The Abdou Building is a historic seven-story building in El Paso, Texas. It was built for the Rio Grande Valley Bank in 1910, and designed by Trost & Trost. In 1925, it was renamed the Abdou Building after its new owner, Sam Abdou, who purchased it for $150,000. The same year, the American Trust and Saving Bank leased the building; one of its directors, Charles Klink was Abdou's stepson. By 1930, the El Paso Bank and Leavell & Sherman both had offices in the building. It has been listed on the National Register of Historic Places since September 24, 1980.
