= Richard Caples Building =

- Caples, Richard, Building
- U.S. National Register of Historic Places
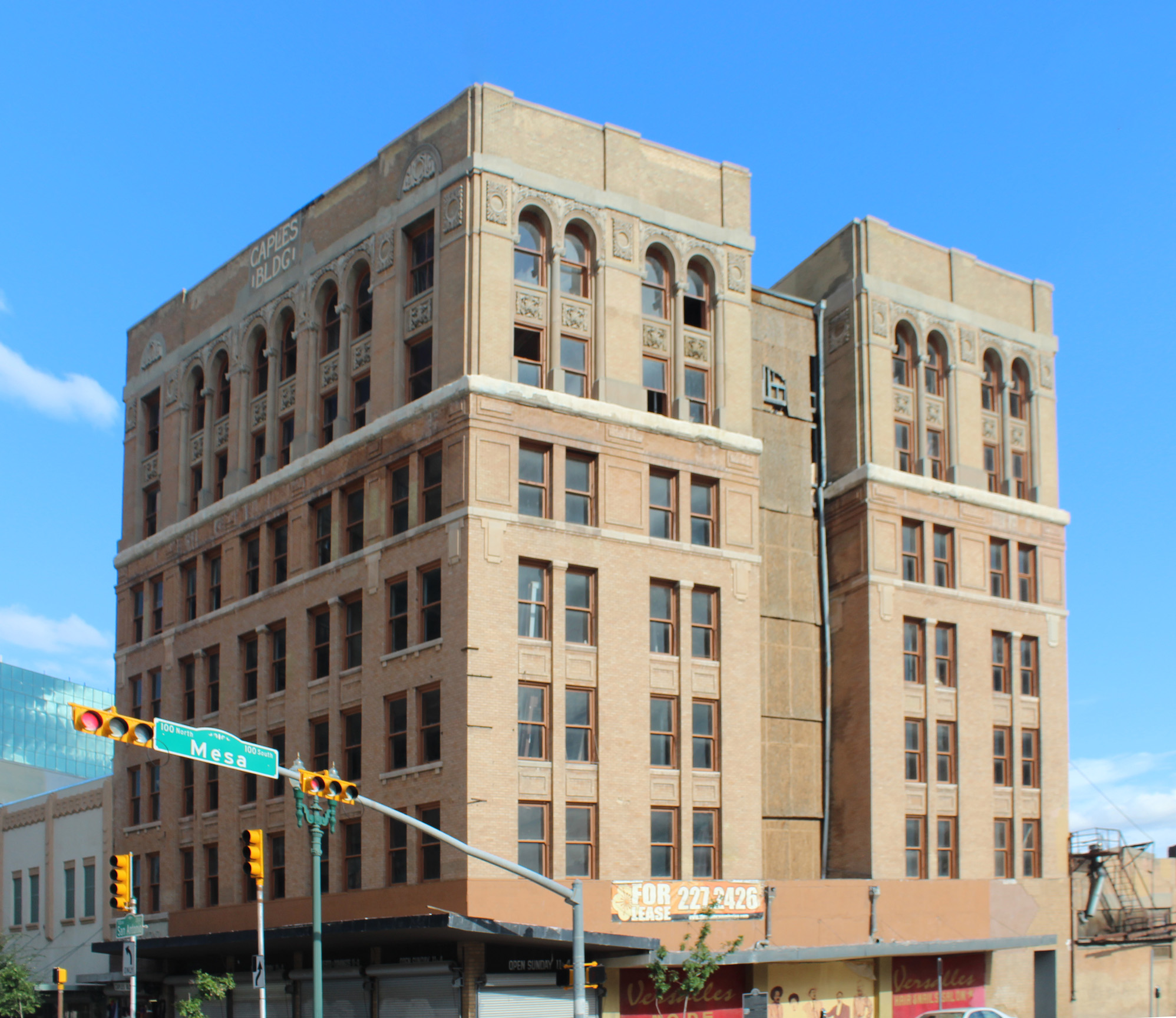
- The building in 2014

- Location within Texas Location within the United States
- Location: 300 East San Antonio Avenue, El Paso, Texas
- Coordinates: 31°45′29″N 106°29′12″W
- Area: less than one acre
- Built: 1910
- Architect: Trost & Trost
- Architectural style: Late 19th And Early 20th Century American Movements, Romanesque
- MPS: Commercial Structures of El Paso by Henry C. Trost TR
- NRHP reference No.: 80004102
- Added to NRHP: September 24, 1980

The Richard Caples Building is a historic seven-story building in El Paso, Texas, significant as the 1910 Francisco I. Madero Headquarters during the Mexican Revolution, base for the Mexican revolutionary newspaper, La Regeneración. It was built as a five-story for Richard Caples in 1910, and it was "the first reinforced concrete structure erected in El Paso." The fifth floor was leased to the Y.M.C.A. In 1915, the building was purchased by J.G. McGrady, who leased the basement and the first floor to F. W. Woolworth Company. Two years later, he built two more storeys; they were designed by Trost & Trost. The building has been listed on the National Register of Historic Places since September 24, 1980.
