= Roberts-Banner Building =

- U.S. National Register of Historic Places
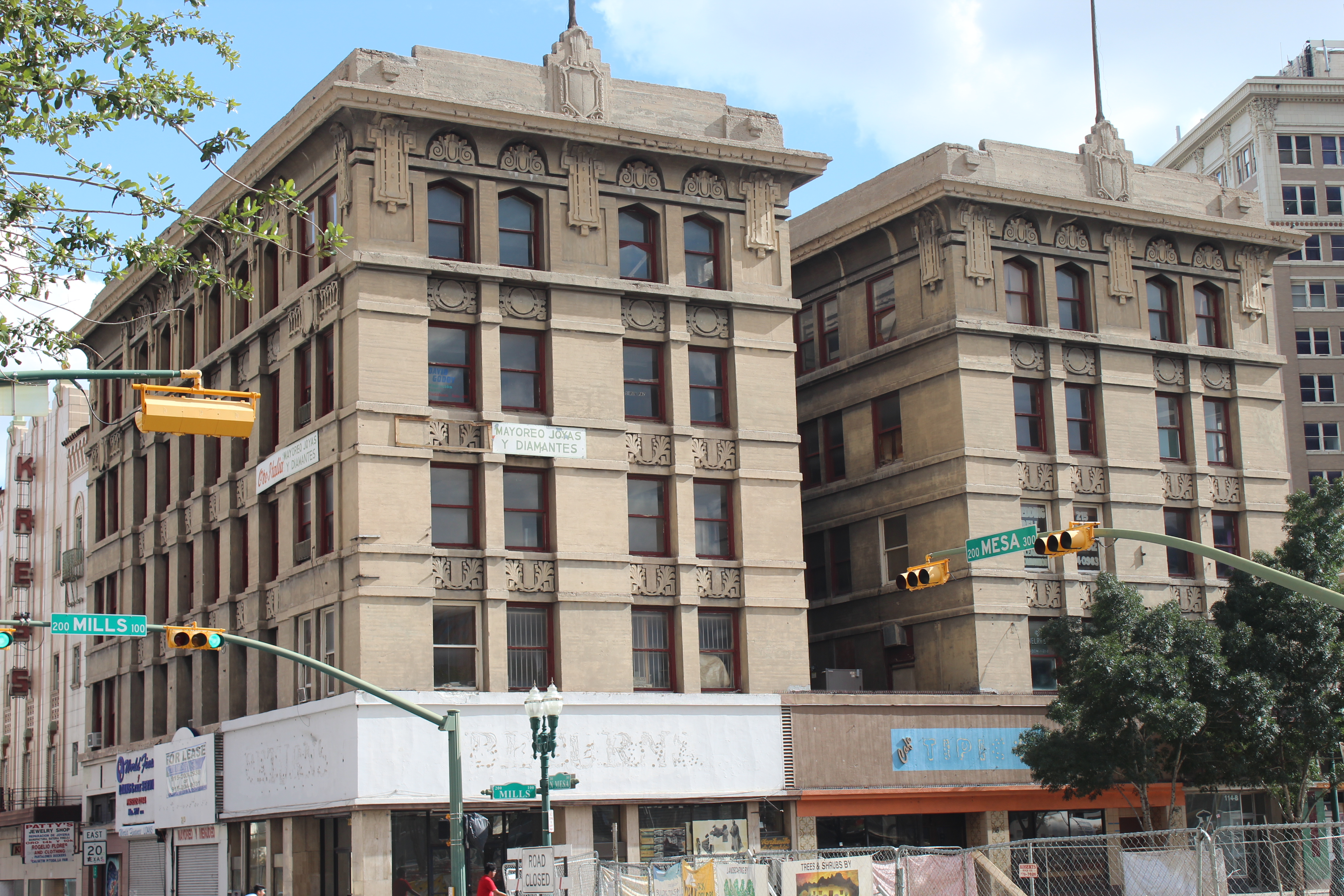
- The building in 2014

- Location within Texas
- Location: 215 North Mesa Street, El Paso, Texas
- Coordinates: 31°45′32″N 106°29′14″W
- Area: less than one acre
- Built: 1910
- Architect: Trost & Trost
- Architectural style: Late 19th And Early 20th Century American Movements
- MPS: Commercial Structures of El Paso by Henry C. Trost TR
- NRHP reference No.: 80004112
- Added to NRHP: September 24, 1980

The Roberts-Banner Building is a historic building in El Paso, Texas. Old adobe houses were demolished to make room for the construction of this five-story building in 1910. It was built with concrete, and designed by Trost & Trost. It has been listed on the National Register of Historic Places since September 24, 1980.
