= White House Department Store and Hotel McCoy =

- U.S. National Register of Historic Places
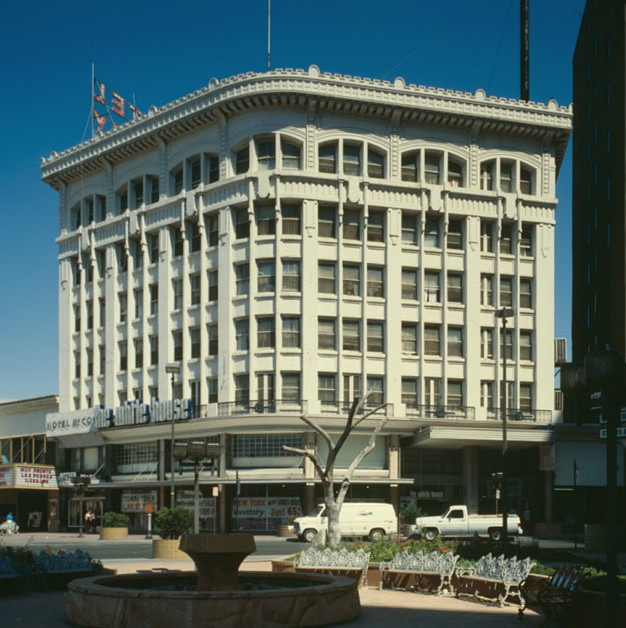

- Location within Texas Location within the United States
- Location: 109 Pioneer Plaza, El Paso, Texas
- Coordinates: 31°45′32″N 106°29′19″W
- Area: less than one acre
- Built: 1912
- Architect: Trost & Trost
- Architectural style: Chicago, Sullivanesque
- MPS: Commercial Structures of El Paso by Henry C. Trost TR
- NRHP reference No.: 80004115
- Added to NRHP: September 24, 1980

The White House Department Store and Hotel McCoy is a historic building in El Paso, Texas. It was built in 1912, and designed in the Chicago School style by architect Henry C. Trost of Trost & Trost. The store itself was co-founded in 1900 by Felix Brunschwig and three of his nephews: Myrtil, Gaston and Arthur Clobentz. In 1904, it was incorporated as Felix Brunchswig & Co. The building was remodelled in 1946-1949 for 1 million dollars. It has been listed on the National Register of Historic Places since September 24, 1980.
