= Montana Avenue Historic District =

- U.S. National Register of Historic Places
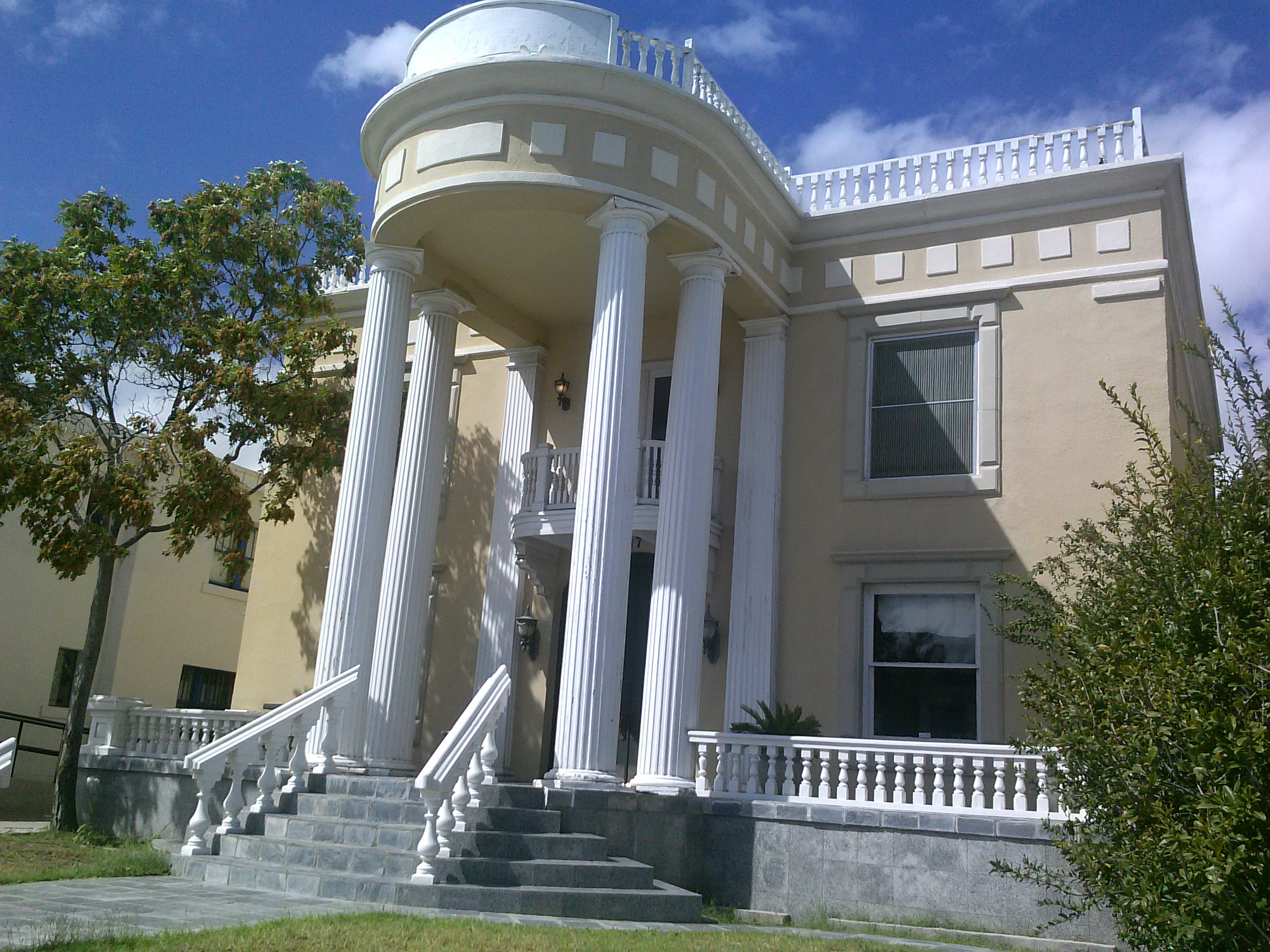

- Location within Texas Location within the United States
- Location: 1000 through 1500 blocks of Montana Ave., El Paso, Texas
- Coordinates: 31°46′21″N 106°28′52″W
- Area: 26 acres (11 ha)
- Built: 1901
- Architect: Henry C. Trost
- Architectural style: Queen Anne, et al.
- NRHP reference No.: 04001232
- Added to NRHP: November 13, 2004

The Montana Avenue Historic District in El Paso, Texas is a historic district which was listed on the National Register of Historic Places in 2004. It includes area of 26 acres (11 ha), in the 1000 through 1500 blocks of Montana Avenue. It included 69 contributing buildings: 51 houses, two churches, and 13 garages, as well as non-contributing buildings (mostly garages in the alley behind the houses).

It is a mostly residential area located in the Franklin Heights Addition at the foothills of the Franklin Mountains, about 1 mile (1.6 km) northeast of El Paso's central business district. It includes two-story brick Prairie Style, Classical Revival, and Queen Anne style works, including several designed by architect Henry C. Trost.
