= State National Bank (El Paso, Texas) =

- U.S. National Register of Historic Places
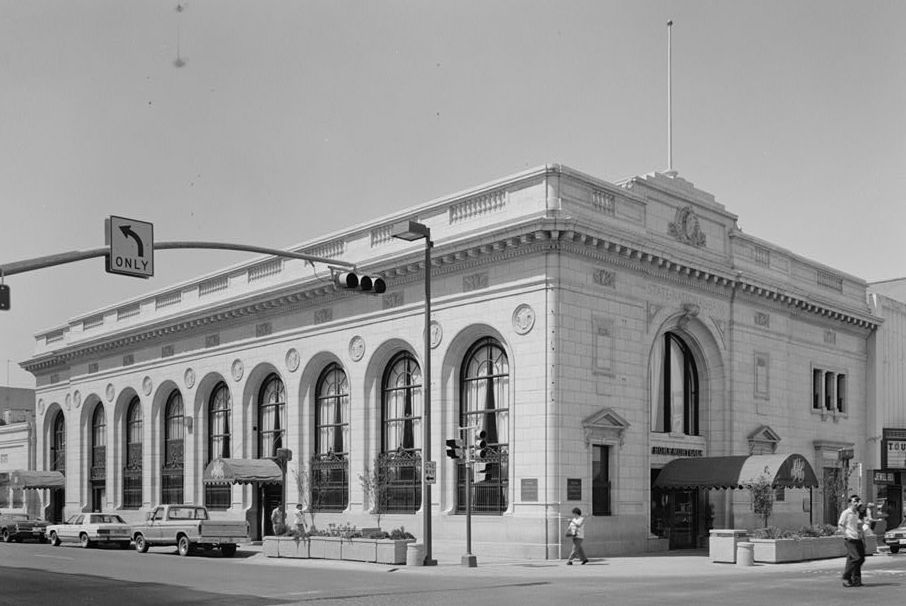

- Location within Texas Location within the United States
- Location: 114 E. San Antonio Ave., El Paso, Texas
- Coordinates: 31°45′28.4″N 106°29′17″W
- Area: less than one acre
- Built: 1921
- Architect: Trost & Trost
- Architectural style: Second Renaissance Revival
- MPS: Commercial Structures of El Paso by Henry C. Trost TR
- NRHP reference No.: 80004114
- Added to NRHP: September 24, 1980

The State National Bank is a historic building in El Paso, Texas. It was built in 1921 for the State National Bank, El Paso's oldest bank founded four decades earlier. It was built on the site of a former building for the same bank completed in 1881, which was El Paso's "first real building." The 1921 building was designed by Trost & Trost, and its construction cost $165,000. With "the latest technological developments", it cost $250,000. The interior was a single lofty room with roof supported by steel girders that eliminated need for interior columns. The bank moved into the building in January 1922. It was expanded by renting adjacent property 10 years later, which was annexed permanently in 1942. It was further expanded to the south in 1948.

The building has been listed on the National Register of Historic Places since September 24, 1980.

The bank that occupied it no longer exists.
