= Boquillas =

Boquillas or Boquilla or variant, may refer to:

== Places ==
- Boquillas, Texas, United States; a settlement on the Rio Grande
- Boquillas del Carmen, Coahuila, Mexico; a settlement on the Rio Grande
  - Boquillas Port of Entry, Big Bend National Park
- Boquillas Canyon, Big Bend National Park, Texas, USA; a canyon on the Rio Grande
- Boquillas Formation, West Texas, USA; a geologic formation laid down in the Cretaceous
- Playa Boquillas, Cazones de Herrera, Veracruz, Mexico; a beach
- La Boquilla Dam, Rio Conchos, Chihuahua, Mexico; a masonry gravity dam
- Playa La Boquilla, Puerto Ángel, Oaxaca, Mexico; a beach
- La Bouqilla, Valle de Bravo, Mexico, Mexico; a settlement
- Boquilla Creek Wildlife Reserve; see List of Puerto Rico landmarks
- Sector Boquilla, Rio Prieto, Lares, Puerto Rico; see List of barrios and sectors of Lares, Puerto Rico

== Other uses ==
- "La Boquilla" (song), a 2005 song by Ska Cubano off the album ¡Ay Caramba! (album)

== See also ==
- Boquila, a genus of plant
