= Del Carmen =

Del Carmen may refer to:

- Del Carmen, San Jose, Camarines Sur, a village in the municipality of San Jose, Camarines Sur, Philippines
- Del Carmen, Surigao del Norte, a municipality on Siargao Island, province of Surigao del Norte, Philippines

== See also ==
- Ciudad del Carmen, city in the Mexican state of Campeche
- Boquillas del Carmen, a village in northern Mexico on the banks of the Rio Grande
