= Daniels Farm House =

Historic house in Texas, United States

- U.S. National Register of Historic Places
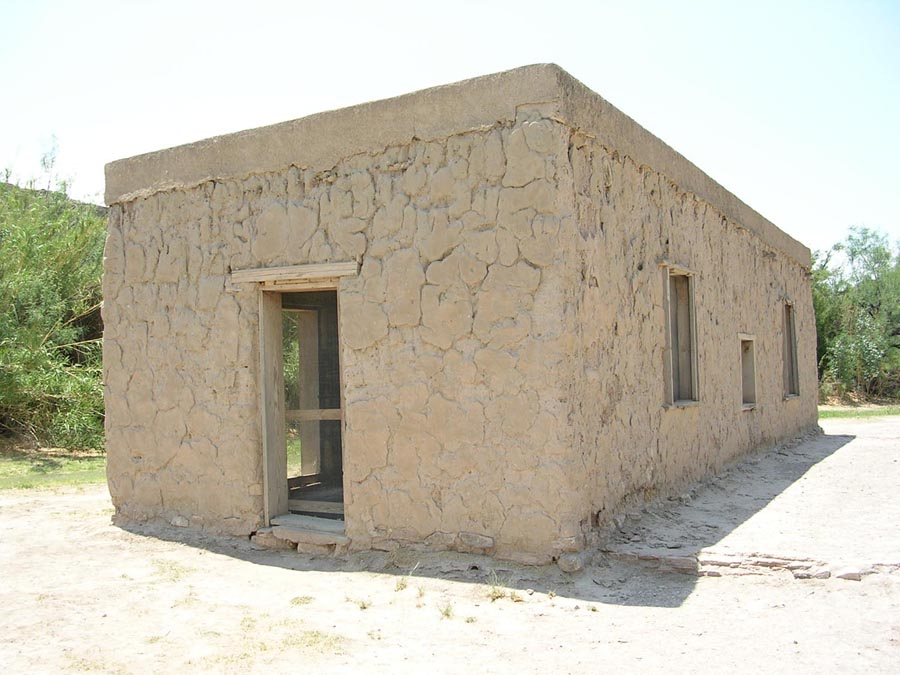

- Location within Texas Location within the United States
- Nearest city: Rio Grande Village, Texas
- Coordinates: 29°11′8″N 102°58′18″W
- Area: 0.2 acres (0.081 ha)
- Built: 1918
- Built by: John O. Wedlin, John R. Daniels
- NRHP reference No.: 89001627
- Added to NRHP: October 20, 1989

The Daniels Farm House represents one of the last vestiges of West Texas pioneer farming in Big Bend National Park, Texas. Most of the small-scale farms in the Big Bend area quickly fell into ruin after the park was established in 1944. Larger-scale ranch structures survived in greater numbers, but the small-scale irrigated bottomland farms have not. The farm is located next to the Rio Grande.

== History ==
The original landowner was Jesus Estrada, who sold the land to John O. Wedlin, a Swedish immigrant. Wedlin, who had farmed wheat in Kansas, leveled the fields, installing a pump-powered irrigation system, establishing one of the first such farms in the area. Wedlin also built the house now known as the Daniels Farm House as a storage shed for farm equipment. Wedlin lived about a mile away, raising wheat for eight years. He sold the farm to cattleman Joe M. Graham of Del Rio, Texas in 1926. Graham, who owned the Lou Buttrill Ranch in the northern Big Bend, used the grain from the Daniels operation to feed his cattle, turning them out in the fields in winter. The Grahams expanded the operation, but sold the northern 200 acres (81 ha) of the property to John R. Daniels and Mary Coe Daniels of Presidio in 1937. The Daniels moved into the former storage shed, using it as their residence and adding a room to house a small store that catered to local residents in the Boquillas community. Daniels converted about 100 acres (40 ha) to cotton. When the park was established in 1944, the Daniels moved away.

== Description ==
The house is a two-room adobe building, about 44 feet (13 m) by 15 feet (4.6 m). The house was roofed with cane latillas over aspen log vigas in a style traditional to the area. The house's surroundings retain traces of the irrigated farm environment and possess good historical integrity.

A small portion of the Daniels Farm comprising the house and its immediate surroundings is incorporated in the National Register of Historic Places listing, established on October 20, 1989. Much of the immediate area has been incorporated into the National Park Service's Rio Grande Village, otherwise known as Boquillas.

== See also ==
- National Register of Historic Places listings in Big Bend National Park
- National Register of Historic Places listings in Brewster County, Texas
