= Homer Wilson Ranch =

- U.S. National Register of Historic Places
- U.S. Historic district
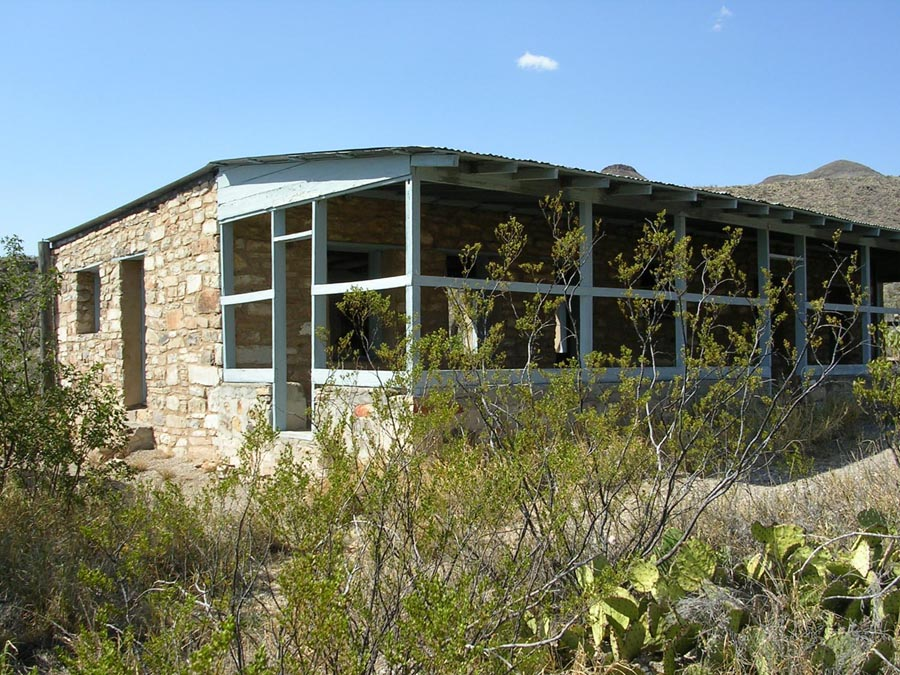
- Homer Wilson House

- Location within Texas Location within the United States
- Nearest city: Santa Elena Junction, Texas
- Coordinates: 29°12′51.78″N 103°21′59.17″W
- Area: 200 acres (81 ha)
- Built: 1929
- NRHP reference No.: 75000153
- Added to NRHP: April 14, 1975

The Homer Wilson Ranch, also known as the Blue Creek Ranch, was one of the largest ranches in the early twentieth century in what would become Big Bend National Park in the U.S. state of Texas. The ranch was established by Homer Wilson in 1929 at Oak Springs to the west of the Chisos Mountains. Ultimately comprising 44 sections of land, amounting to more than 28,000 acres (11,000 ha), the Oak Canyon-Blue Creek Ranch was acquired by the State of Texas in 1942 for incorporation into the new park. A large portion of the ranch comprised portions of the old G4 Ranch (named after Survey Block G4), established by John and Clarence Gano in the 1880s. Wilson's ranch focused on sheep and goats, the first such large operation in the Big Bend area. Wilson continued to live at the ranch until his death in 1943; his family moved from the ranch the next year. Wilson, born in Del Rio, Texas in 1892, had studied petroleum engineering at the Missouri School of Mines and was a World War I veteran. The ranch, with the headquarters at Oak Springs and its operational center at Blue Creek, was one of the largest in Texas, and the most significant ranch in Big Bend.

The Blue Creek residence measures about 24 feet (7.3 m) by 60 feet (18 m) with a 16-foot (4.9 m) by 60-foot (18 m) screened porch on the south side of the house. The single-story residence comprised two bedrooms, a living room and a kitchen, with a large central fireplace. The house features a double roof, the inner layer a traditional reed roof of the type locally used, with a sheet metal roof above. Another building housed ranch help. The structures were abandoned when the Wilsons moved out.

The Blue Creek area of the Wilson ranch was placed on the National Register of Historic Places on April 14, 1975.

== See also ==
- National Register of Historic Places listings in Big Bend National Park
- National Register of Historic Places listings in Brewster County, Texas
