= Hot Springs (Big Bend National Park) =

Big Bend Hot Springs
- Bocatillas Hot Springs; Langford Hot Springs
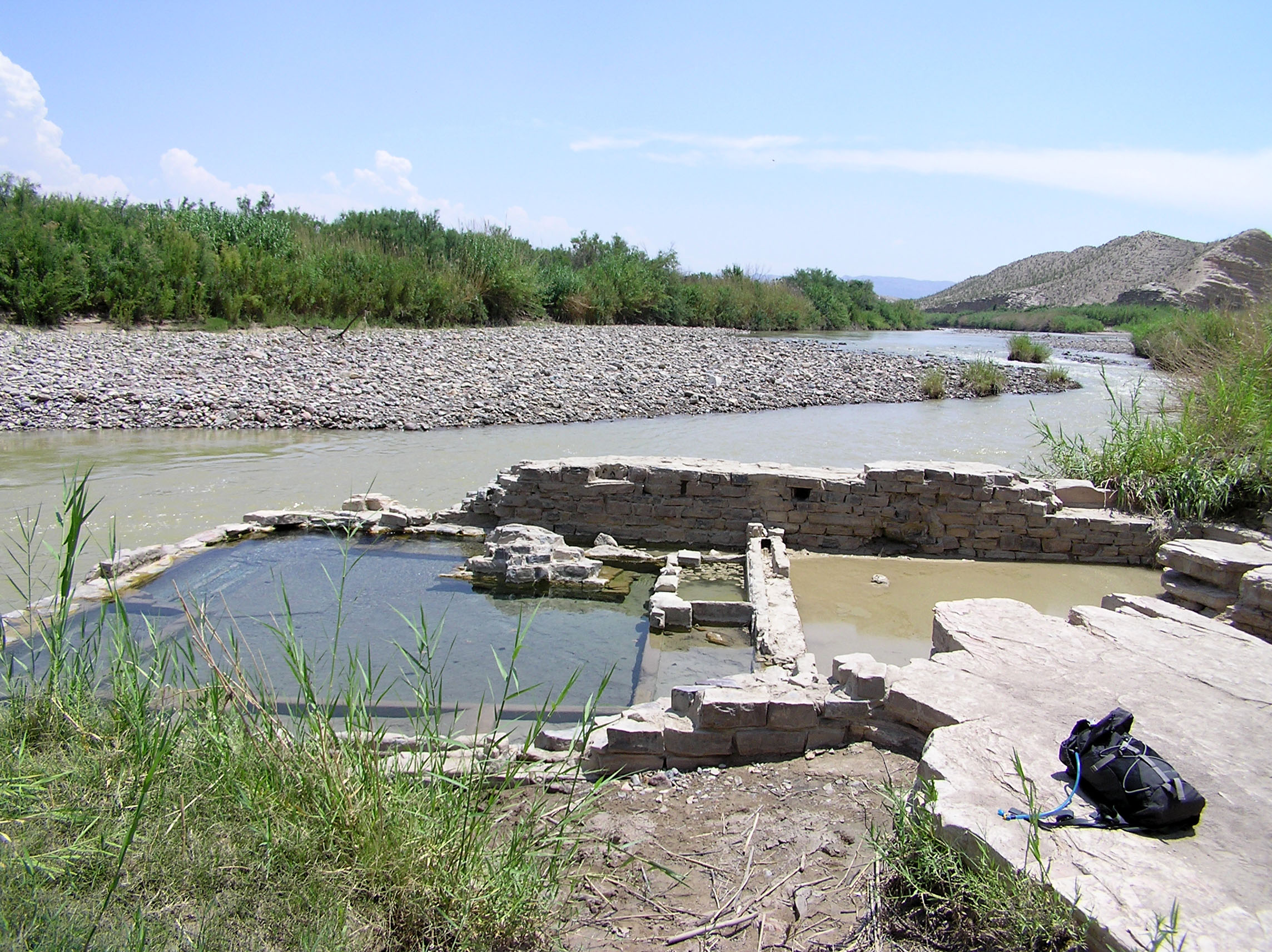
- Hot springs and old foundation of bathhouse
- Interactive map of Big Bend Hot Springs
- Location: Big Bend, Texas
- Type: Geothermal
- Temperature: 105 °F (41 °C)
- Hot Springs
- U.S. National Register of Historic Places
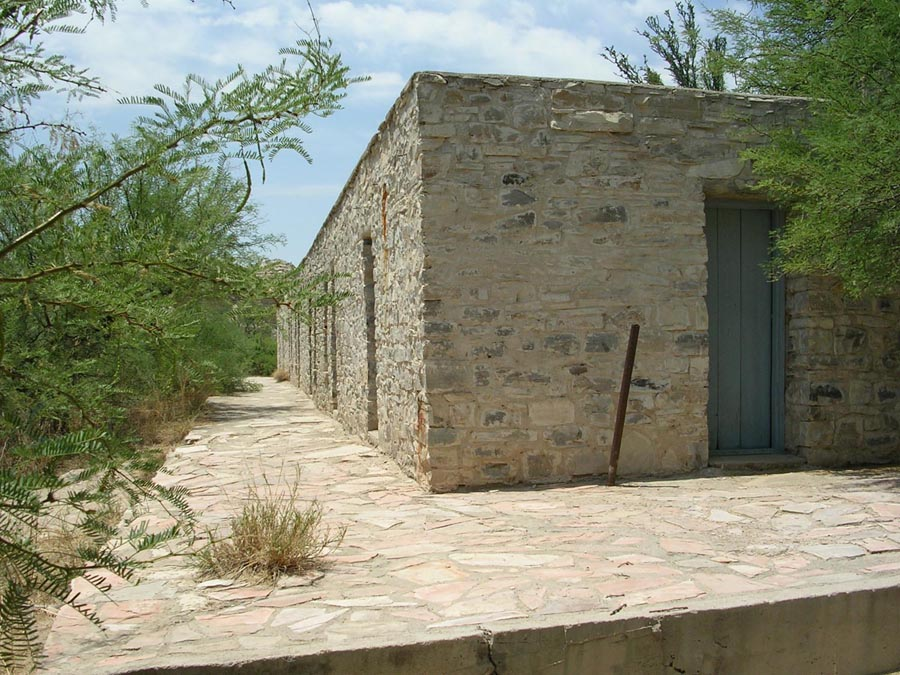
- Hot Springs cabins

- Location within Texas Location within the United States
- Location: W of Rio Grande Village, Big Bend National Park, Texas
- Coordinates: 29°10′39″N 102°59′55″W
- Area: 115 acres (47 ha)
- Built: 1909
- NRHP reference No.: 74000278
- Added to NRHP: September 17, 1974

Hot Springs, also known as Boquillas Hot Springs, and Langford Hot Springs is a former thermal spring resort in what is now Big Bend National Park in Texas. Hot Springs was placed on the National Register of Historic Places in 1974.

== History ==
The springs were developed by J.O. Langford beginning in 1909. Langford was a Mississippi native who had contracted malaria as a child. Searching for a cure, he heard of reputedly curative hot springs on the Rio Grande while visiting Alpine, Texas. Langford made a homestead claim, sight unseen. Although other homestead claims on the site had failed, Langford, his wife Bessie and his 18-month-old daughter set out for the site, discovering that it was already occupied by Cleofas Natividad with his wife and ten children. Initially considering the Natividads squatters, the Langfords developed a cooperative relationship with the Natividads. Langford took a 21-day treatment of drinking and bathing in the spring waters, regaining his health.

The site was the first major tourist attraction in the area, predating the establishment of the national park. Before Langford's development, a small stone tub had been excavated in the local stone for bathing, with a dugout that was renovated by the Langfords as a residence. The Langfords later built an adobe house, a stone bathhouse, and brushwood bathing shelters. The Langfords left in 1912 when bandits made the area unsafe. When they returned in 1927 they rebuilt the bathhouse, but with a canvas roof. They also built a store and a motor court, consisting of seven attached cabins.

The structures were built of local stone with wood trussed roofs covered with corrugated metal. Interior walls were plastered. Four of the motor court rooms featured painted murals. A terrace was covered with a long porch or ramada connecting the cabins.

In the historic district, there are petroglyphs made by Native Americans. The springs were visited by Pedro de Rábago y Terán in 1747, who found Apaches farming the area. In later years the Comanche Trail passed nearby. The hot springs remain, at a temperature of 105 degrees Fahrenheit, and may be used for soaking. The water contains sodium, potassium, calcium, magnesium, sulfate, chloride and smaller concentrations of arsenic, lithium, rubidium, strontium, thallium, uranium, and tungsten.

Hot Springs was placed on the National Register of Historic Places on September 17, 1974.

== Water profile ==
The spring water is fossil water, and is irreplaceable. The geothermally heated mineral water emerges from the source at 105°F.

The spring is frequently submerged by the Rio Grande. The site is accessible by unpaved road, about 2 miles (3.2 km) west of Rio Grande Village, otherwise known as Boquillas.

== See also ==
- National Register of Historic Places listings in Big Bend National Park
- National Register of Historic Places listings in Brewster County, Texas
