= Rancho Estelle =

- U.S. National Register of Historic Places
- U.S. Historic district
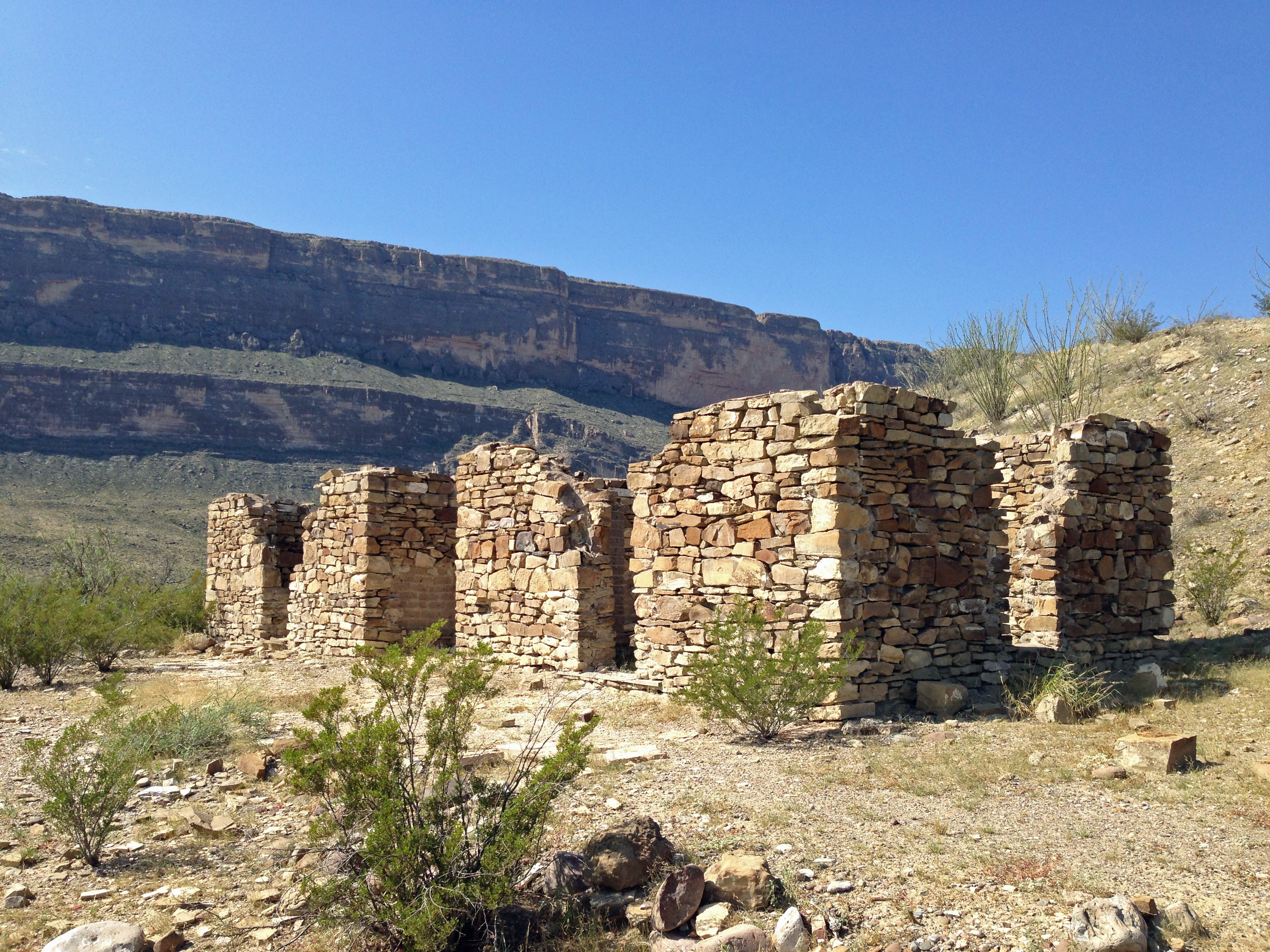
- Remains of the Sublett house

- Location within Texas Location within the United States
- Location: On the Rio Grande, Big Bend National Park, Texas
- Coordinates: 29°09′17″N 103°34′42″W
- Area: 135 acres (55 ha)
- NRHP reference No.: 74000280
- Added to NRHP: September 3, 1974

Rancho Estelle was the home of James Sublett, one of the first large-scale farmers in the Rio Grande valley of Texas, within what is now Big Bend National Park. Prior to founding the ranch, Sublett and his partner, Clyde Buttrill, farmed the bottomlands along the river in the area of what is now known as Castolon or La Harmonia, downstream from the later ranch. After the partnership with Buttrill broke up, Sublett bought four sections of land, initially calling it Grand Canyon Farms, and later Rancho Estelle.

Most of the existing structures are in ruins. The chief structures include the Sublett Farm House, a one-story adobe house with a cane and viga roof and a porch at the front. The house consists only of two rooms separated by a hall. Other structures include a small house for farm workers, similar to the Sublett house, a single-room adobe shed and a stone house for farm workers, with two apartments and a day room. The most substantial structure is the Dorgan Residence, a 1,200-square-foot (110 m^{2}) adobe and stone house of one story for Sublett's son-in-law. The interior features a large living room and three smaller rooms. The fireplace supports the roof, and is constructed of petrified wood.

Rancho Estelle was placed on the National Register of Historic Places on September 3, 1974.

== See also ==
- National Register of Historic Places listings in Big Bend National Park
- National Register of Historic Places listings in Brewster County, Texas
