= Cerro Castellan =

Summit in Texas, United States

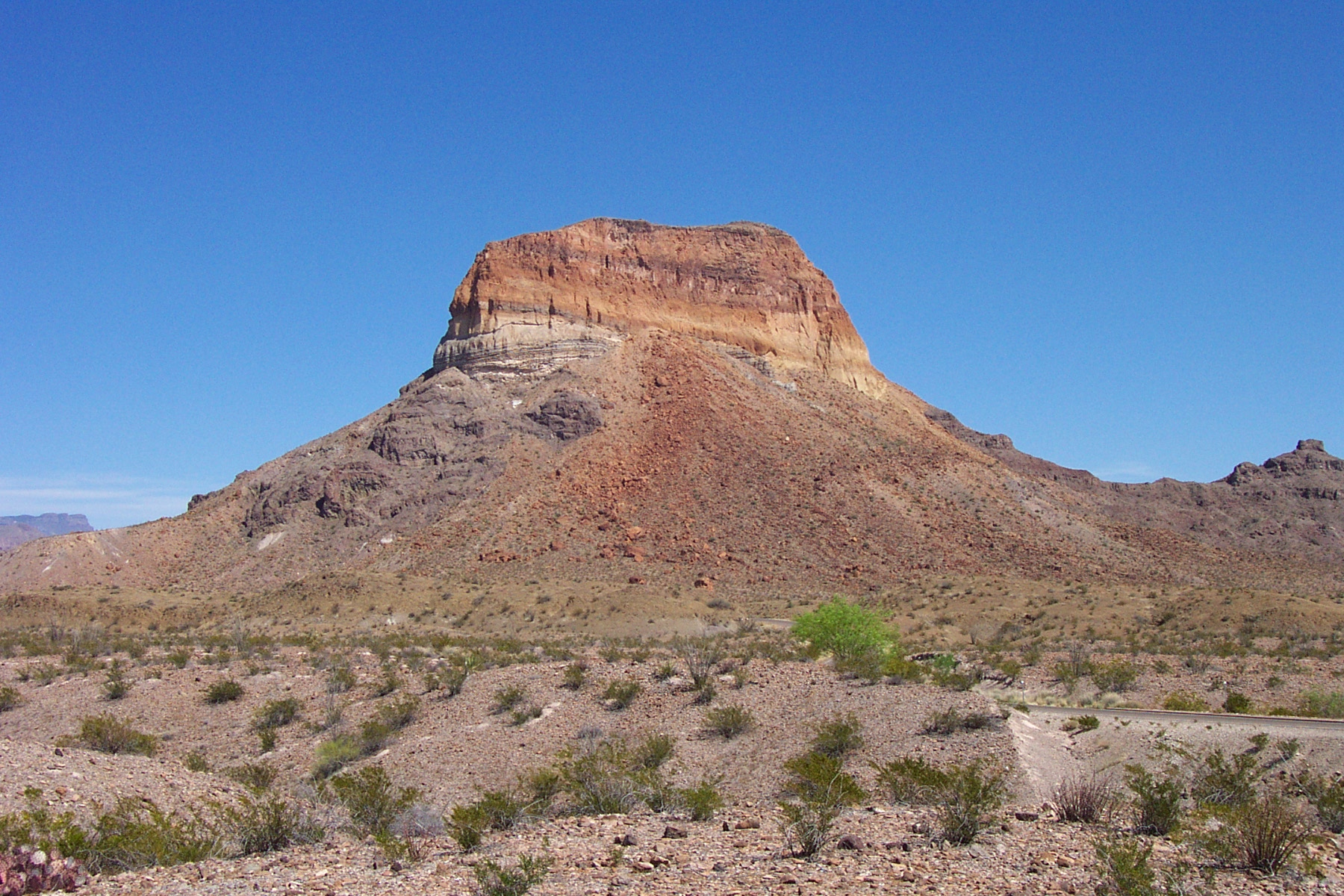
- West aspect

Highest point
- Elevation: 3,294 ft (1,004 m)
- Prominence: 955 ft (291 m)
- Isolation: 3.07 mi (4.94 km)
- Coordinates: 29°08′41″N 103°29′51″W

Geography
- Location within Texas Location within the United States
- Country: United States
- State: Texas
- County: Brewster
- Protected area: Big Bend National Park
- Parent range: Chisos Mountains
- Topo map: USGS Cerro Castellan

Geology
- Rock age: Oligocene
- Mountain type: Butte
- Rock type: Igneous rock

Climbing
- Easiest route: class 4

Cerro Castellan is a 3,294-foot-elevation (1,004-meter) summit in Brewster County, Texas, United States.

== Description ==
Cerro Castellan is part of the Chisos Mountains where it is set in Big Bend National Park and the Chihuahuan Desert. The top of the butte is a caprock composed of Burro Mesa Rhyolite which formed 29 million years ago during the Oligocene period. The next lower layer of volcanic rock is composed of Wasp Spring Tuff of the Burro Mesa Formation, followed by Chisos Tuff and Bee Mountain Basalt of the Chisos Formation. Based on the Köppen climate classification, the mountain is located in a hot arid climate zone with hot summers and mild winters. Any scant precipitation runoff from the peak's slopes drains to the Rio Grande which is 1.5 miles (2.4 km) to the southwest. Topographic relief is significant as the summit rises over 1,000 feet (305 m) above Ross Maxwell Scenic Drive in one-half mile (0.8 km). The mountain's toponym was officially adopted on March 15, 1939, by the United States Board on Geographic Names. The Spanish name Cerro Castellan may translate to "ruler of a castle on a hill," or "castle-warden's hill" where castellan is the caretaker of a castle. The iconic landmark is also known as Castolon Peak, and the former village of Castolon took its name from the nearby butte.

== See also ==
- List of mountain peaks of Texas
- Geography of Texas

== Gallery ==
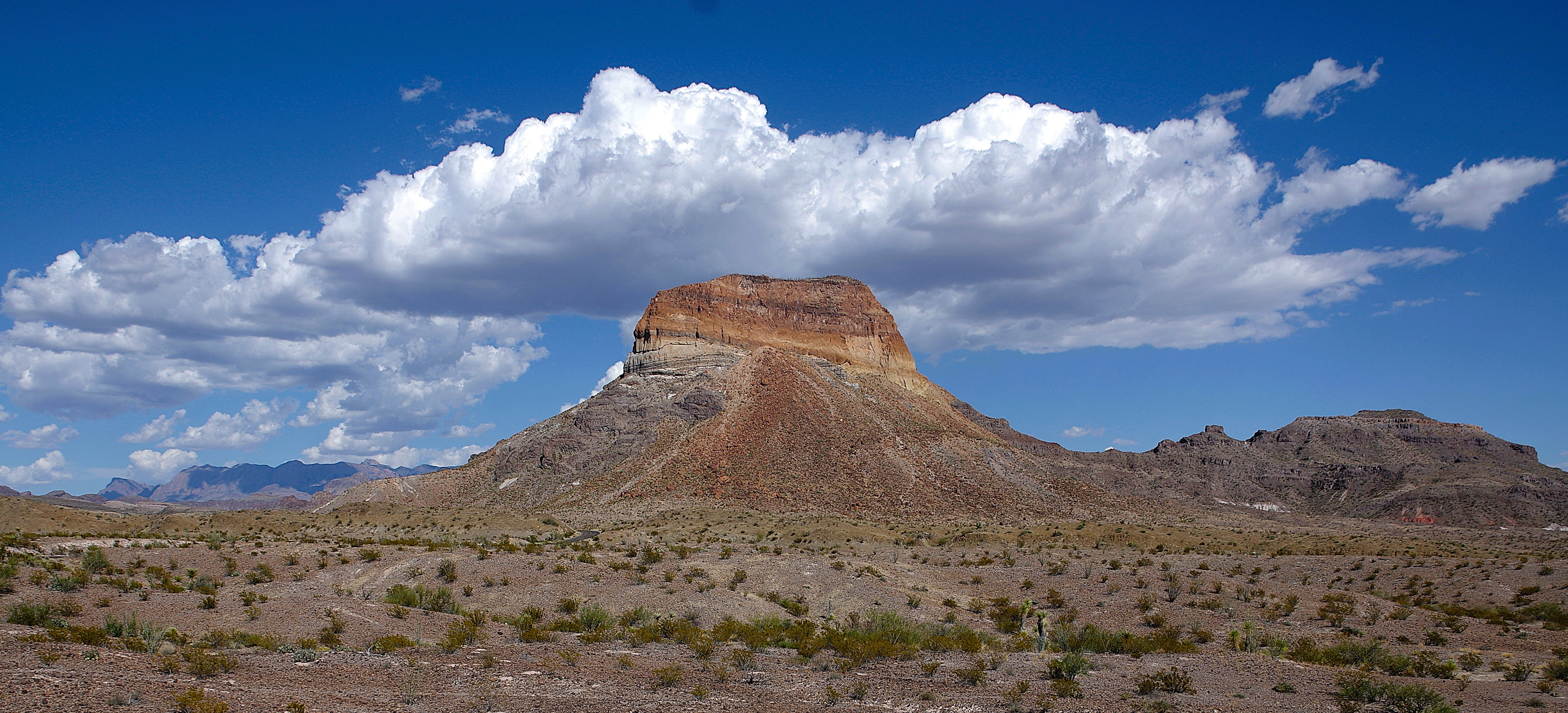
West aspect

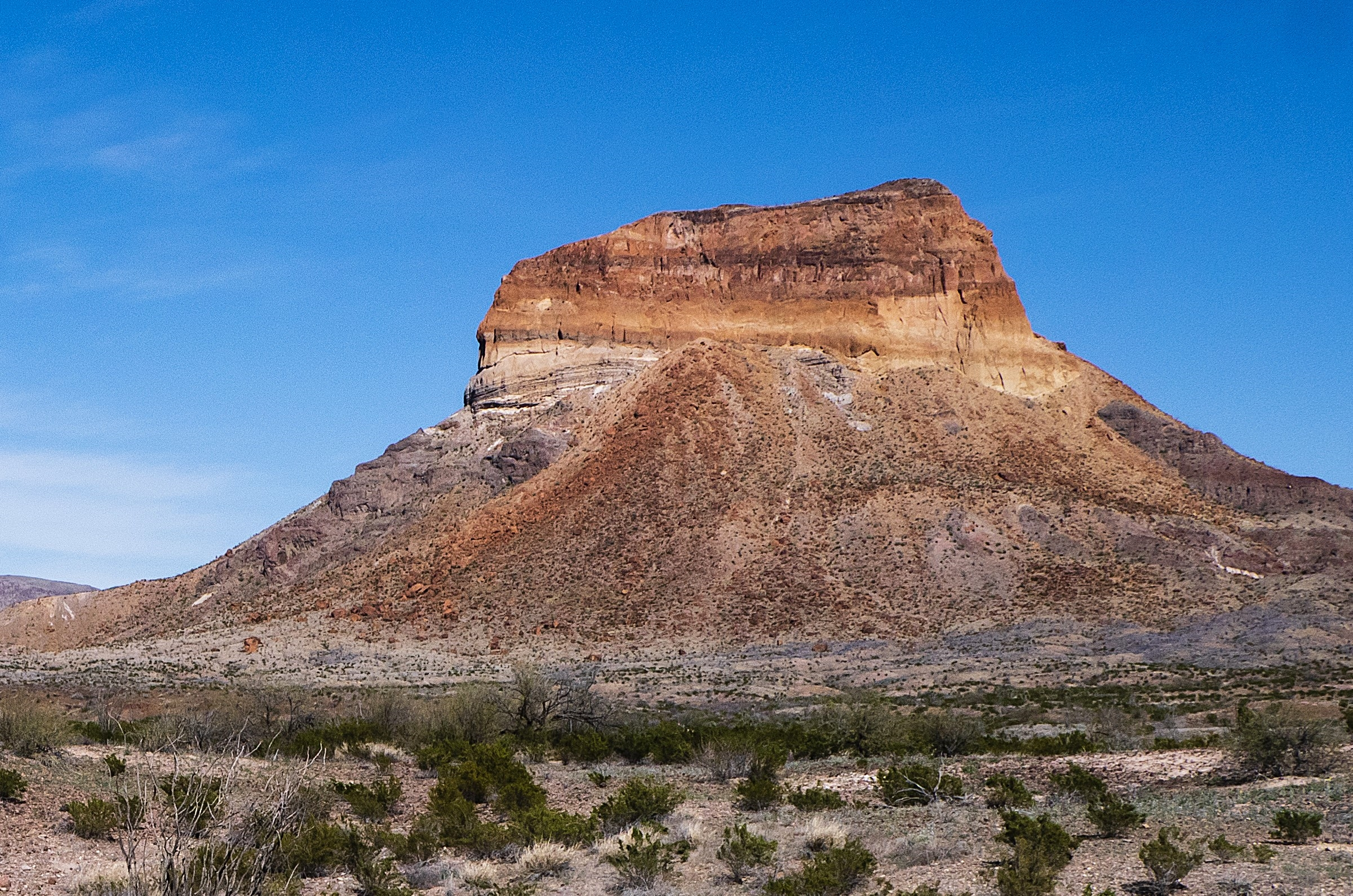
West aspect

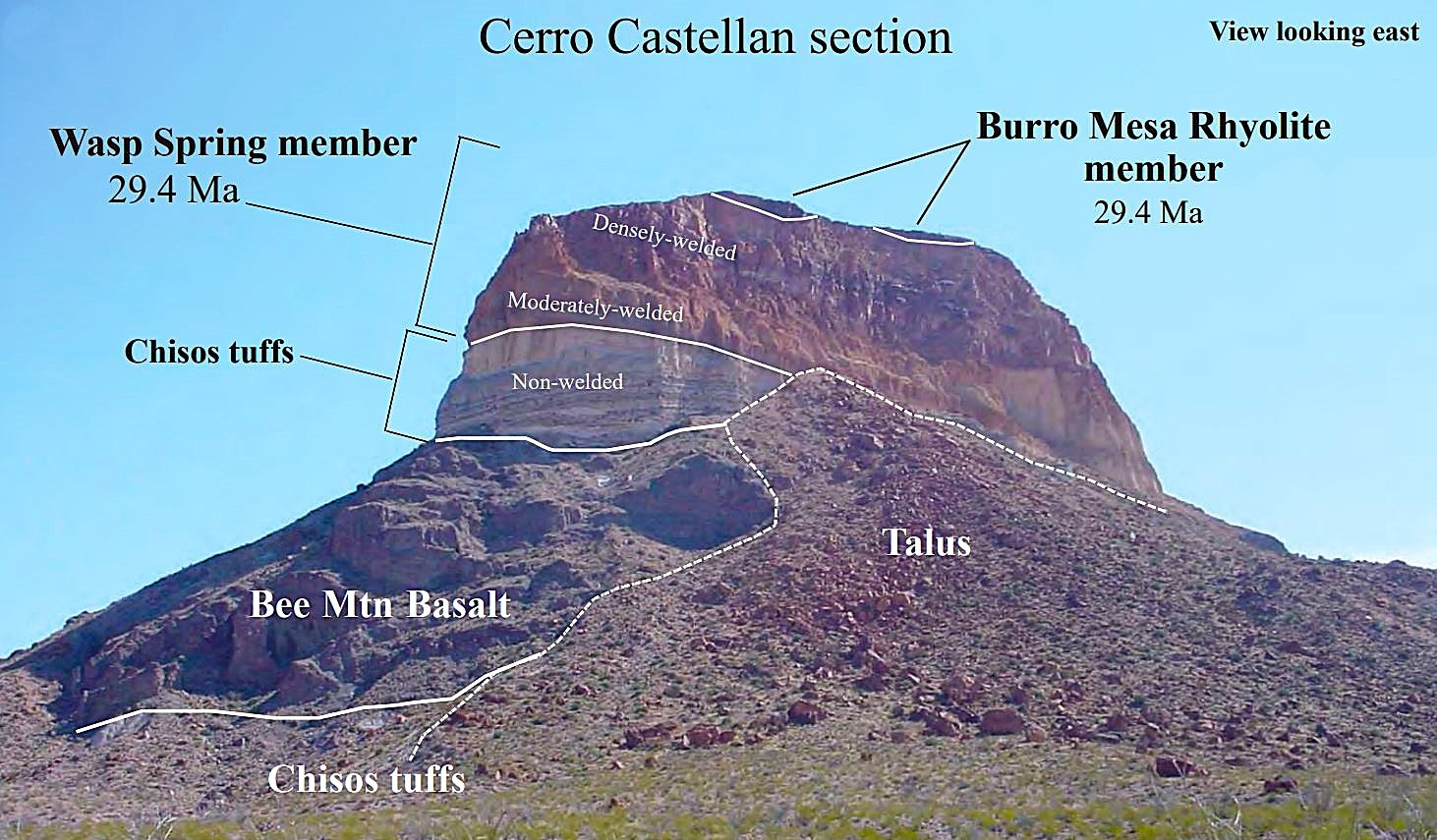

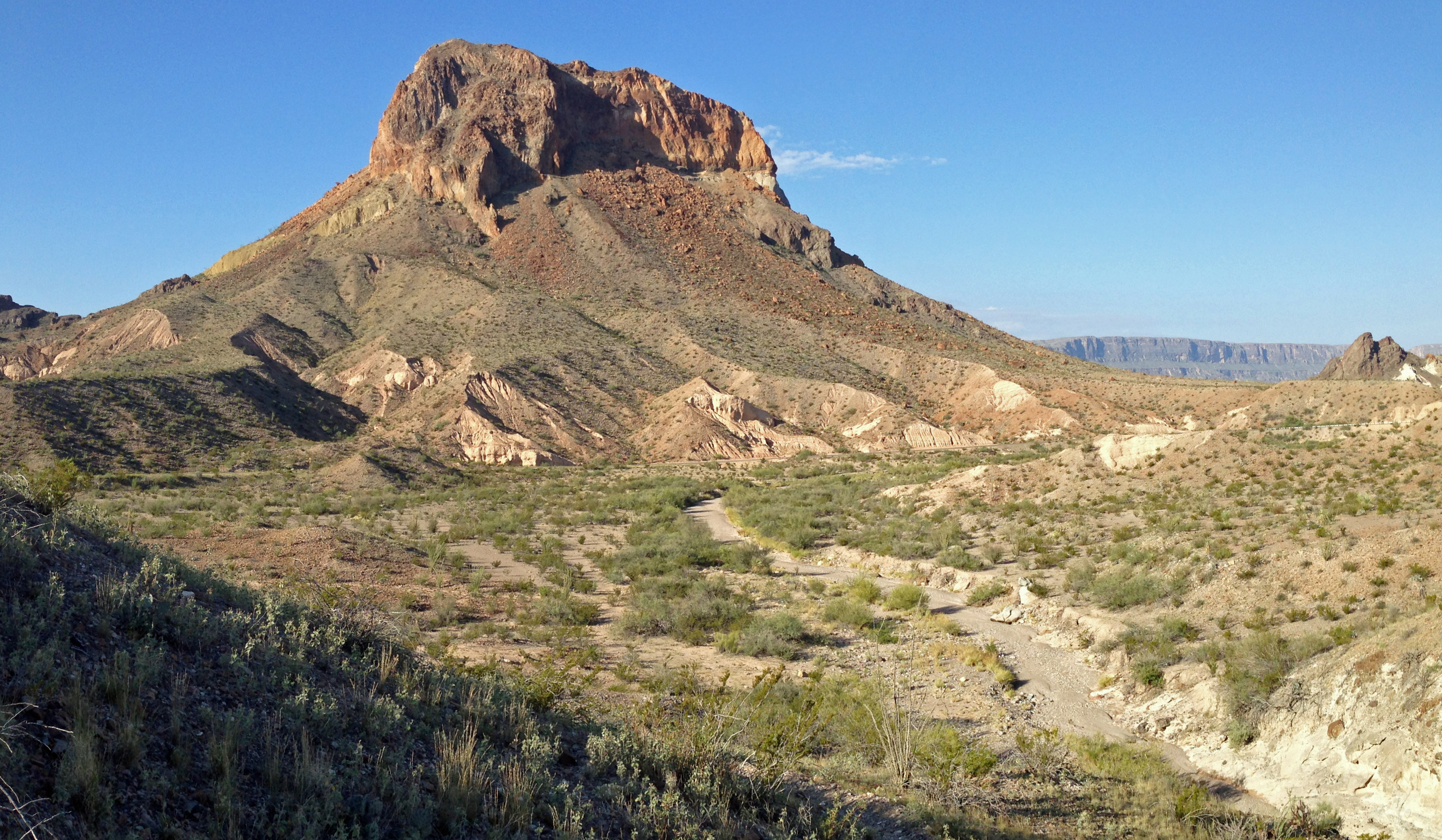
East aspect

West aspect

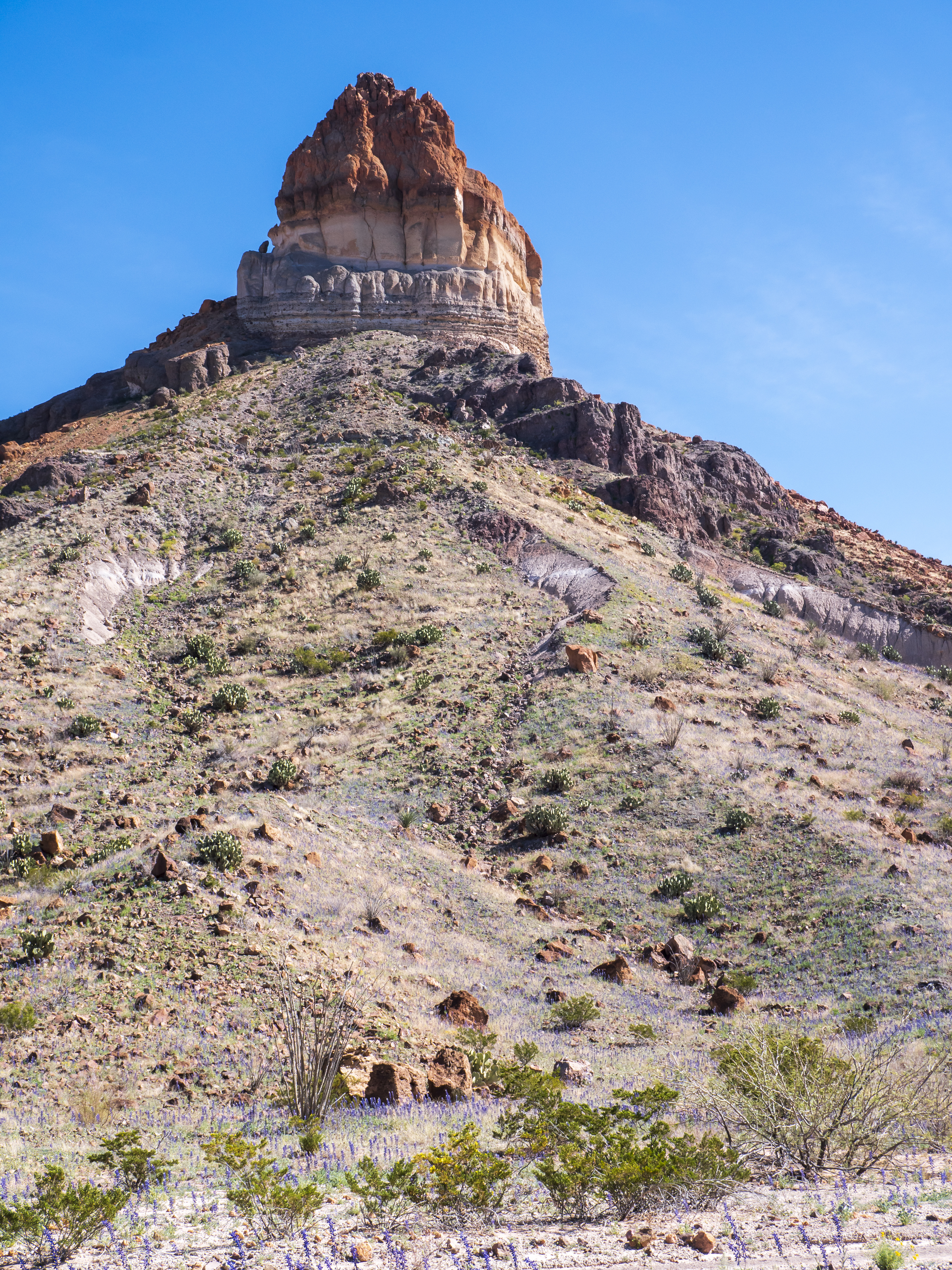
Northwest aspect

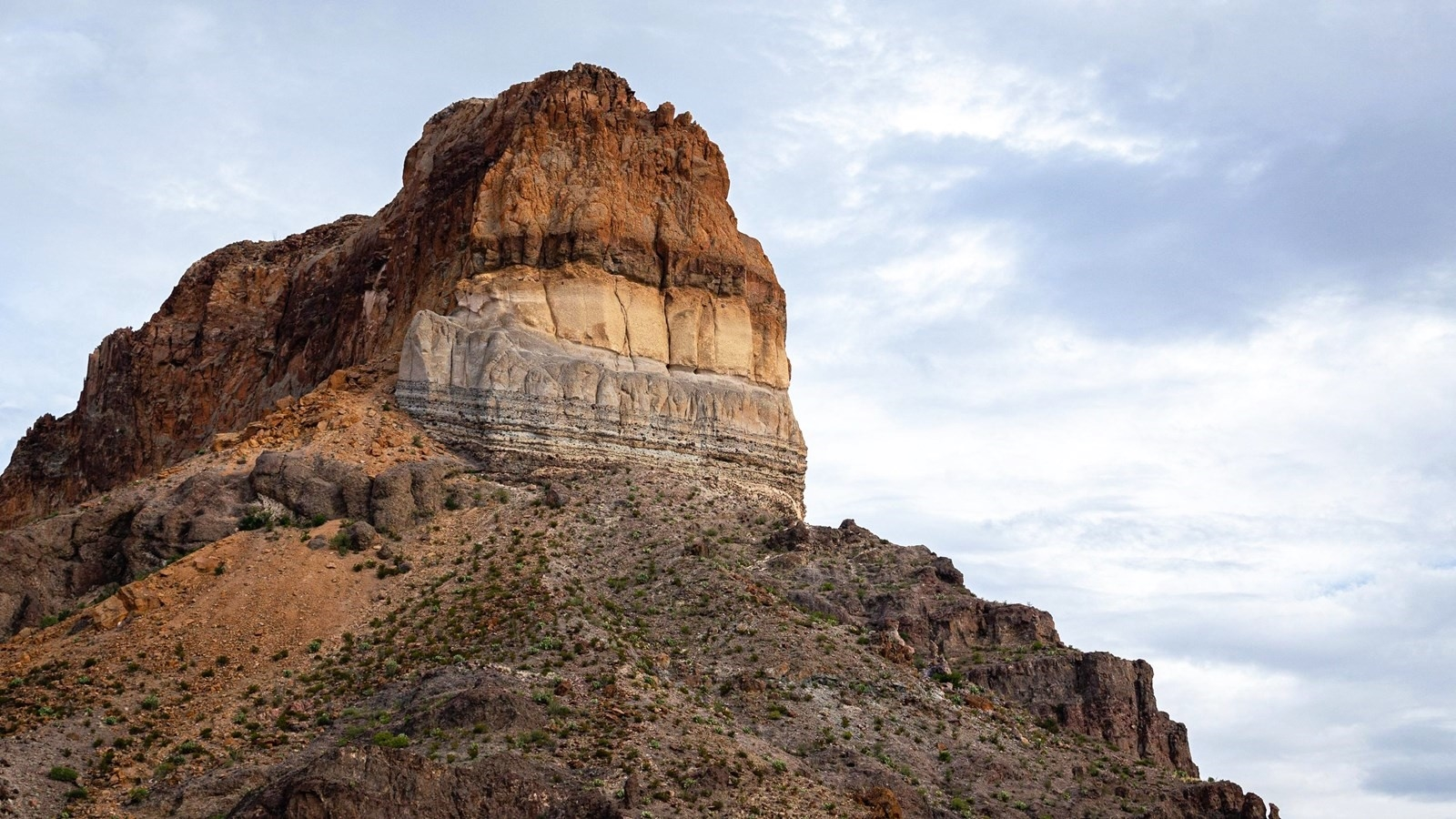
North aspect
