= National Register of Historic Places listings in Brewster County, Texas =

Location of Brewster County in Texas

This is a list of the National Register of Historic Places listings in Brewster County, Texas

This is intended to be a complete list of properties and districts listed on the National Register of Historic Places in Brewster County, Texas. There are 9 districts and 9 individual properties listed on the National Register in the county. Two sites are also listed as Recorded Texas Historic Landmarks including one that is a State Antiquities Landmark.

This National Park Service list is complete through NPS recent listings posted June 6, 2026.

== Current listings ==
The publicly disclosed locations of National Register properties and districts may be seen in a mapping service provided.

	Name on the Register	Image	Date listed	Location	City or town	Description
1	Alpine Downtown Historic District		May 11, 2026 (#100012985)	Roughly bounded by W. Lockhart Ave to the north, N. 3rd St to the east, W. A venue H to the south, and S. 9th St. to the west, plus the Centennial School. 30°21′31″N 103°39′42″W	Alpine	
1	Brewster County Courthouse and Jail	Brewster County Courthouse and Jail	July 17, 1978 (#78002899)	Courthouse Sq. 30°21′30″N 103°39′48″W	Alpine	State Antiquities Landmark; Recorded Texas Historic Landmark
2	Burro Mesa Archeological District	Burro Mesa Archeological District	September 11, 1985 (#85002309)	Address restricted	Panther Junction	
3	Castolon Historic District	Castolon Historic District	September 6, 1974 (#74000276)	Along Rio Grande at jct. of Park Rtes. 5, 9, and 35; 29°08′03″N 103°30′51″W	Big Bend National Park	
4	Daniels Farm House	Daniels Farm House	October 20, 1989 (#89001627)	W of Rio Grande Village in Big Bend National Park; 29°11′08″N 102°58′18″W	Rio Grande Village	
5	Gage Hotel	Gage Hotel	December 4, 2020 (#100005910)	102 NW 1st St. (US 90 West); 30°12′24″N 103°14′46″W	Marathon	
6	Grandview Courts-Siesta Motel		September 24, 2025 (#100012263)	1200 East Holland Avenue; 30°21′39″N 103°39′01″W	Alpine	
7	Holland Hotel	Holland Hotel	April 21, 2025 (#100011753)	201 and 209 West Holland Avenue; 30°21′27″N 103°39′46″W	Alpine	
8	Hot Springs	Hot Springs	September 17, 1974 (#74000278)	W of Rio Grande Village; 29°10′39″N 102°59′56″W	Big Bend National Park	
9	Kokernot Field	Kokernot Field	March 23, 2026 (#100012845)	400 Loop Road; 30°22′22″N 103°39′53″W	Alpine	
10	Luna Jacal	Luna Jacal	November 8, 1974 (#74000282)	At base of Pena Mountain in Big Bend National Park; 29°12′56″N 103°32′05″W	Big Bend National Park	
11	Mariscal Mine	Mariscal Mine	September 13, 1974 (#74000279)	River Rd. 29°05′42″N 103°11′17″W	Big Bend National Park	
12	Nolte-Rooney House	Nolte-Rooney House	April 17, 1997 (#97000360)	307 E. Sul Ross Ave. 30°21′37″N 103°39′35″W	Alpine	Recorded Texas Historic Landmark
13	Panther Junction Mission 66 Historic District	Panther Junction Mission 66 Historic District	September 19, 2014 (#14000626)	P.O. Box 129; 29°19′40″N 103°12′21″W	Big Bend National Park	
14	Rancho Estelle	Rancho Estelle	September 3, 1974 (#74000280)	On the Rio Grande; 29°09′20″N 103°34′35″W	Big Bend National Park	
15	South Side Historic District		June 10, 2026 (#100012744)	Roughly bounded by bounded by the Southern Pacific Railroad to the north; Avenue A South to the west; Avenue G South to the east; and West 6th Street South and East 7th Street South to the south. 30°12′06″N 103°14′48″W	Marathon	
16	Terlingua Historic District	Terlingua Historic District	March 10, 1996 (#96000132)	7 mi. W of jct. of TX 118 and TX 170; 29°19′15″N 103°36′57″W	Terlingua	
17	Homer Wilson Ranch	Homer Wilson Ranch	April 14, 1975 (#75000153)	8 mi. S of Santa Elena Junction on Park Rte. 5, Big Bend National Park; 29°12′50″N 103°22′00″W	Santa Elena Junction	

== See also ==
- National Register of Historic Places listings in Texas
- Recorded Texas Historic Landmarks in Brewster County
