= Ska Cubano =

British band

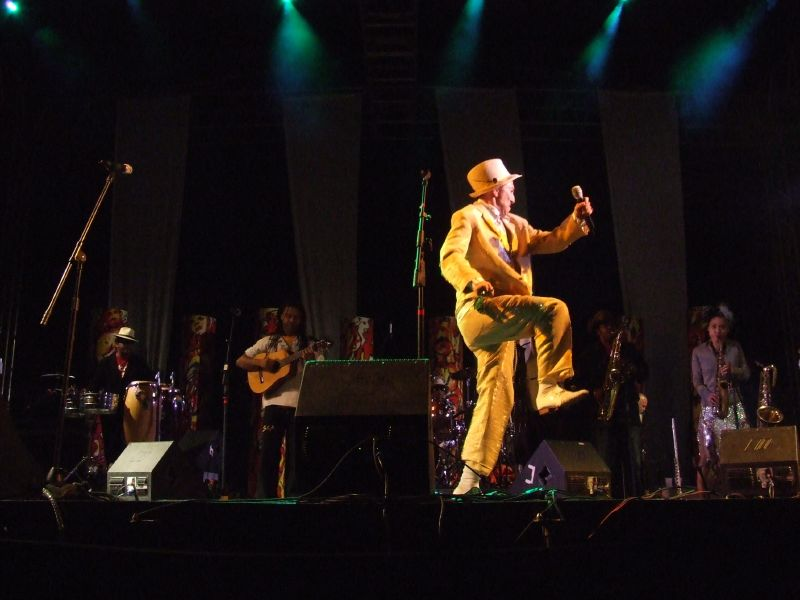

Background information
- Origin: London, England
- Genres: Ska, mambo
- Years active: 2001–present
- Label: Casinosounds
- Members: Natty Bo; Beny Billy; Megumi Mesaku; Rey Crespo; Jesús Cutiño; Oresta Noda; Dr. Sleepy; Eddie "Tan Tan" Thornton
- Website: http://www.skacubano.com/

Ska Cubano is a London-based group which combines ska and Cuban music such as son and mambo, with elements of other genres including cumbia and calypso.

== History ==
The group was put together by investment manager Peter A. Scott, who in his own words "decided to create an alternative history in which Cuban ska had emerged". He travelled to Santiago de Cuba with Top Cats singer Natty Bo (Nathan Lerner) in 2001 and there they rehearsed and recorded the Ska Cubano album over a two-year period mainly with local musicians including singer Beny Billy (Juan Manuel Villy Carbonell). In late 2004, Scott and Bo decided to go for a less Cuban sound and formed a line-up in London mainly using UK-based Cuban and other Caribbean musicians (three of whom were/are also members of Top Cats, Natty Bo's traditional ska band ). After some experimentation, with Natty Bo as leader and vocalist, the permanent core of Ska Cubano became : Cubans (from Havana) Rey Crespo and Ernesto Estruch, Jesús Cutiño (Las Tunas), Oreste Noda (Matanzas) and Kico Cowan (Camaguey), together with, from Montserrat, Dr Sleepy (Reuben White), from Spanish Town, Jamaica, Eddie "Tan Tan" Thornton, from Chiba City, Japan, Miss Megoo (Megumi Mesaku) and Londoner Trevor Edwards, with Beny Billy commuting from Santiago for recordings and performances.

In 2006 Venezuelan Carlos Pena gradually took over as co-lead singer, although Beny continued to record and occasionally tour with Ska Cubano. Trumpeter Jay Phelps also began to perform and record with the band. The second Ska Cubano album, ¡Ay Caramba!, was nominated for a BBC World Music Award in the "Culture Crossing" category. The album was described as "imaginatively crafted, brimming with melody, wit and a joyous fusion of rhythms, this album’s about as much fun as you can have with your clothes on". According to the website all.about.jazz their third album, Mambo Ska, released in May 2010, is "A blast - a raucous, riotous, irresistible blast...high octane party and festival music of the first order".

Ska Cubano have performed at major festivals worldwide including Glastonbury, Big Day Out, and WOMAD, and toured to date, in 30 countries.

Bobine by Ska Cubano was used in the soundtrack of the first series of Dexter, an American television series set in Miami. In 2010/11, their song Soy Campesino was used extensively for television adverts for the UK electrical retailer Comet.

The Ska Cubano project was suspended and the band stopped accepting touring requests in 2014.

The Trumpeter Eddie Thornton died on 10 December 2025 at the age of 91.

== Band members ==
- Natty Bo (Nathan Lerner) - vocals
- Carlos Pena - vocals and minor percussion
- Beny Billy (Juan Manuel Villy Carbonell) - vocals
- Miss Megoo ( Megumi Mesaku ) - alto and baritone saxophones
- Trevor Edwards - trombone
- Kico Cowan - tenor saxophone and flute
- Rey Crespo (musical director) - double bass and marimbula
- Jesús Cutiño - tres (Cuban 3x2-strung guitar)
- Ernesto Estruch - piano, organ and violin
- Oresta Noda - congas and pailas
- Dr. Sleepy (Reuben White) - drumkit
- Tan Tan ( Eddie Thornton ) - trumpet (died 2025)
- Jay Phelps - trumpet

== Discography ==
- Ska Cubano (2003), Victor – reissued (2004), Absolute
- ¡Ay Caramba! (2005), casinosounds
- Ajiaco! The Remix Album, (2008) casinosounds/Universal Portugal [ not, strictly, a Ska Cubano album but remixes of Ska Cubano tracks by independent DJ's ]
- Mambo Ska (2010), casinosounds
