= Luna Jacal =

Historic house in Texas, United States

- U.S. National Register of Historic Places
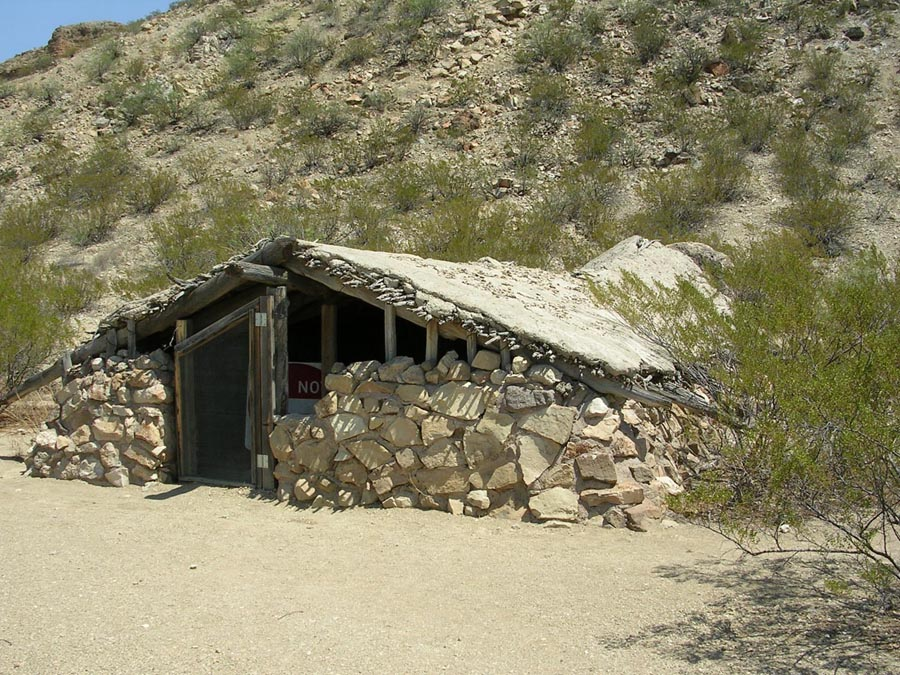
- Luna Jacal

- Location within Texas Location within the United States
- Location: At base of Pena Mountain in Big Bend National Park, Big Bend National Park, Texas
- Coordinates: 29°12′55″N 103°32′4″W
- Area: 1.5 acres (0.61 ha)
- Built: 1890
- NRHP reference No.: 74000282
- Added to NRHP: November 8, 1974

The Luna Jacal or Luna's Jacal was the residence of Gilberto Luna, a Mexican pioneer farmer in the area of Texas that would become Big Bend National Park. The jacal, an indigenous Tejano dwelling suited to the desert environment, was built about 1890 with a low sandstone and limestone wall about 4 feet (1.2 m), with forked poles set upright into the walls, supporting roof poles. The house backs up to a large boulder. A heavier line of poles extends the length of the jacal. The roof was made of ocotillo branches weighted down with earth and stones, presently replaced with an inappropriate soil-cement roof. Luna raised a large family at the jacal, peacefully coexisting with otherwise hostile Comanche who used the Alamo Creek area as a war trail. Luna died there in 1947 at age 108 or 109.

Luna's jacal was placed on the National Register of Historic Places on November 8, 1974. It was restored in 1971 and again stabilized in 1983.

== Luna and the Comanche War Trail ==
The write-up for the National Register of Historic Places states

In the early years, Alamo Wash was on the Comanche War Trail through the Park, and Luna somehow established peaceful relations with these savage warriors and also with the Apaches resident in the vicinity. That he survived the incursions of these raiding Indians is a tribute to his diplomacy

While a popular story associated with the jacal, some doubt exists that Gilberto Luna lived at the jacal while the Comanche War Trail was active. The NRHP write-up uses the Road Guide to Paved and Improved Dirt Roads of Big Bend National Park as source material, originally published in 1980. As late as the 1987 revision of the guide this same verbiage is intact, but in the 2010 revision of the guide, the verbiage had been removed.

In the book Exploring The Big Bend Country an interview by Peter Koch with a grandson of Luna, Demencio C. Luna Jr., puts Luna's arrival at Alamo Wash after the close of the Comanche Trail:

My grandfather [Gilberto Luna] was born around 1840 in Durango, Mexico where he lived for many years. In 1901, at the age of sixty he crossed the Rio Grande into the United States

The book A Guide to Hispanic Texas says Luna's Jacal was built about 1900, which agrees with Gilberto Luna's grandson's claim, and years after the last band of Comanches moved to the Fort Sill reservation in Oklahoma in 1874–75.

== See also ==
- National Register of Historic Places listings in Big Bend National Park
- National Register of Historic Places listings in Brewster County, Texas
