= Burro Mesa Archeological District =

Historic district in Texas, United States

- U.S. National Register of Historic Places
- U.S. Historic district
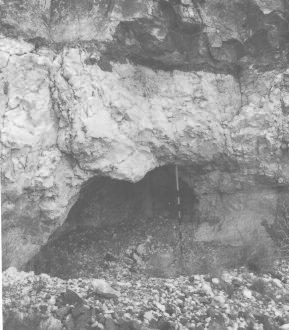
- Location: Address restricted
- Nearest city: Panther Junction, Texas
- Area: 260 acres (110 ha)
- NRHP reference No.: 85002309
- Added to NRHP: September 11, 1985

The Burro Mesa Archeological District encompasses a quarry in Big Bend National Park used by Native Americans as a source of chert for chipped-stone tools. The quarry was used intermittently beginning in the paleoindian period starting about 12,000 to 13,000 years ago. The chert is found in a variety of colors and rests on top of tuff beds which themselves contain veins of kaolinite that was suitable for making claystone ornaments and beads. The quarry area is carpeted with lithic debris from the initial knapping process by which chert was rough-shaped into material of suitable size and shape for later refinement at more convenient locations.

The quarry was placed on the National Register of Historic Places on September 11, 1985.

== See also ==
- National Register of Historic Places listings in Big Bend National Park
- National Register of Historic Places listings in Brewster County, Texas
