= Jacal =

Adobe-style housing structure

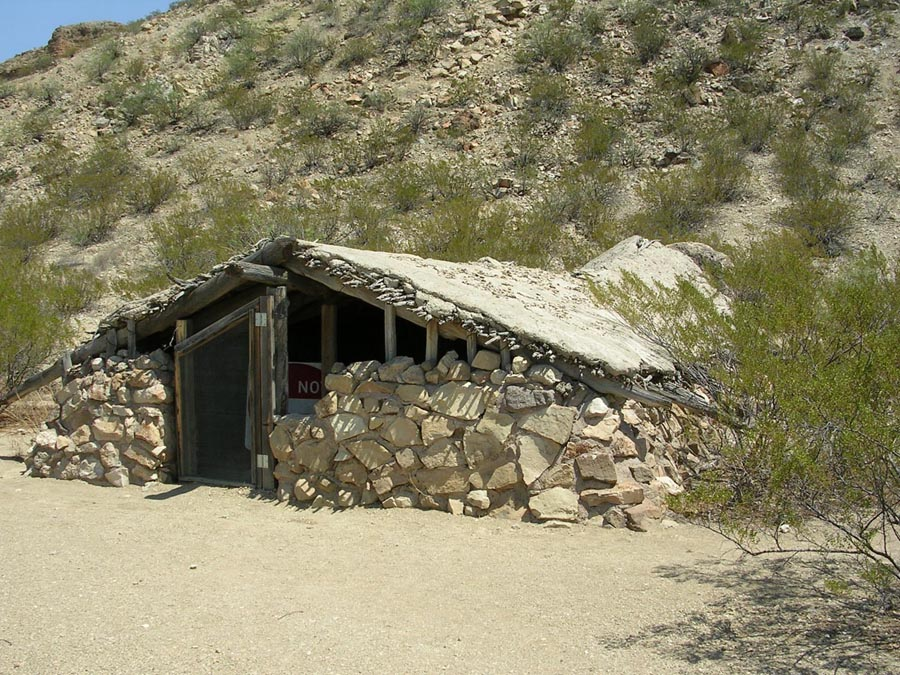
Luna Jacal in Big Bend National Park.

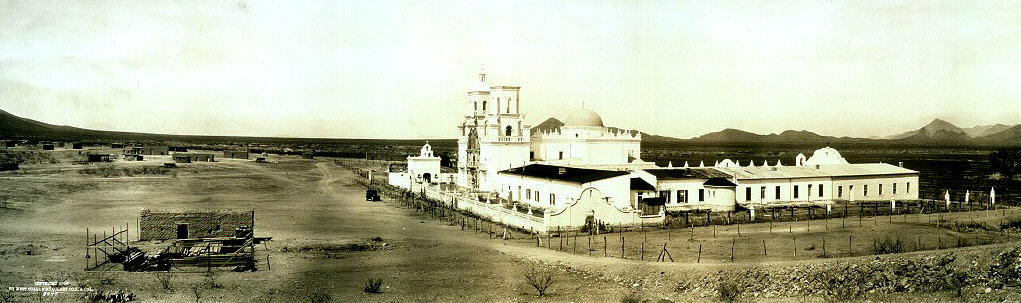
Southern Arizona's San Xavier del Bac in 1913. Tohono O'odham jacals can be seen in front of the mission, many of which are still used today.

The jacal (/həˈkɑːl/; Mexican Spanish from Nahuatl xacalli contraction of xamitl calli; literally "hut") is an adobe-style housing structure historically found throughout parts of the Southwestern United States and Mexico. This type of structure was employed by some aboriginal people of the Americas prior to European colonization and was later employed by both Hispanic and non-Hispanic settlers in Texas and elsewhere.

Typically, a jacal consisted of slim close-set poles tied together and filled out with mud, clay and grasses. More sophisticated structures, such as those constructed by the Ancestral Pueblo people, incorporated adobe bricks—sun-baked mud and sandstone.

Jacal construction is similar to wattle and daub. However, the "wattle" portion of jacal structures consists mainly of vertical poles lashed together with cordage and sometimes supported by a pole framework, as in the pit-houses of the Basketmaker III period of the Ancestral Puebloan (a.k.a. Anasazi) people of the American Southwest. This is overlain with a layer of mud/adobe (the "daub"), sometimes applied over a middle layer of dry grasses or brush which functions as insulation.

== See also ==
- Luna Jacal in Big Bend National Park
