= María G. Sada =

Mexican-American businesswoman

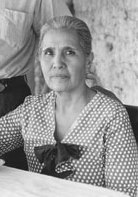
- Born: María G. Sada; December 5, 1884; Irapuato, Guanajuato, Mexico
- Died: July 13, 1973 (aged 88); Del Rio, Texas, U.S.
- Occupations: Businesswoman; Midwife; Educator
- Known for: Proprietor of "Chata's Place" in the Boquillas Canyon area
- Spouse: Juan Sada

María G. "Chata" Sada (December 5, 1884 - July 13, 1973) was a Mexican-American businesswoman, informal educator and midwife in Boquillas Canyon. Sada ran the last store and restaurant in the Boquillas area, "Chata's Place" between 1901 and 1936. Eventually the land it stood on became part of the Big Bend National Park.

== Biography ==
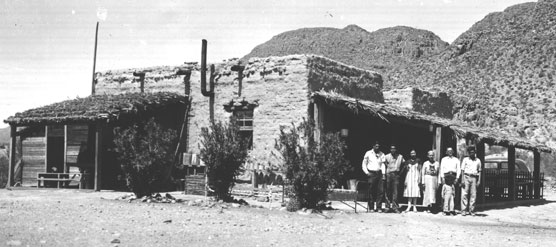
The Sada family in front of Chata's restaurant at Boquillas, Texas, 1930s.

Sada was born in Iraxuato, Guanajuato. "Chata" is a nickname meaning "flat nose" or "cute." She was raised in the Big Bend area of Mexico. Sada and Juan Sada moved to the Boquillas area in the 1880s and got married in 1901. The couple never had children, but adopted and fostered many children who needed homes. None of the children the Sadas raised were officially adopted, but were cared and look after according to Mexican custom. After securing a permanent visa, she moved to the Texas side of the Rio Grande where she and her husband built an adobe house that became a general store and cafe.

Sada was in charge of the business, known as "Chata's Place," because her husband ran a silver mine in Coahuila. In order to improve business, Sada learned English so she could better serve various people who came to Big Bend. Sada even cashed checks for her customers and kept beer cold in a "kerosene-powered refrigerator." Visitors to the area could lodge at Chata's Place. She also prepared food for travelers. Sada was considered an excellent shot, and had protected her livestock from mountain lions and rattlesnakes. In addition to running the store and restaurant, she also started teaching and acting as the local midwife for people in both Texas and Mexico starting in the 1920s. In the late 1930s, Sada and her husband had the only store in Boquillas.

Juan Sada died on December 24, 1936, and eventually Maria Sada closed down the business and moved to Del Rio a few months after. After she left, Big Bend National Park removed Chata's Place. In Del Rio, Sada lived with one of her sons. On July 7, 1960, she was invited to a ceremony at Big Bend National Park where she was greeted and remembered by the community.

Sada died on July 13, 1973. Funeral rites were held on July 15 at St. Joseph's Catholic Church in Del Rio.
