= Mariscal Mine =

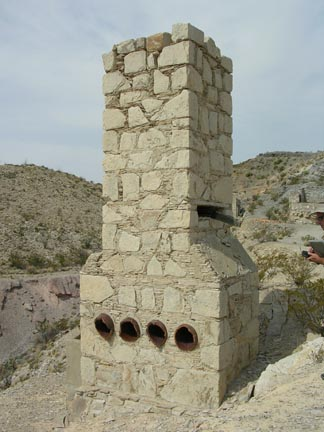
- Exhaust stack and chimney
- Interactive map of Mariscal Mine
- Location: Texas, USA; 29°05′42″N 103°11′13″W
- Products: Cinnabar
- Mariscal Mine
- U.S. National Register of Historic Places
- U.S. Historic district
- Location within Texas Location within the United States
- Location: River Rd., Big Bend National Park, Texas
- Area: 640 acres (260 ha)
- Built: 1900
- NRHP reference No.: 74000279
- Added to NRHP: September 13, 1974

The Mariscal Mine, also known as the Lindsey Mine and the Ellis Mine, was a source of cinnabar ore that was refined at the Texas site into mercury. The mine is located in what is now Big Bend National Park. The mine produced a total of 1,400 flasks of mercury, each weighing 76 pounds (34 kg), accounting for almost a quarter of the mercury production in the United States between 1900 and 1943.

== History ==
Brewster County, Texas is a source of cinnabar ore, and the mineral was discovered in the Mariscal area in 1900 by rancher Martin Solis. The first mining was done by D.E. Lindsey, a U.S. Immigration inspector who refined the ore at Terlingua. Ellis sold his interest to Isaac Sanger of Dallas in 1905, who operated the Texas Almaden Mining Company, but Sanger's operation was unable to survive. W.K. Ellis operated the Ellis Mine from 1917 to 1919, refining 894 flasks at the mine site. When mercury prices dropped at the end of World War I, Ellis sold to William Burcham in 1919. Burcham and backers from New York operated the Mariscal Mining Company from 1919 and expanded the refining operations at the mine using a Scott furnace before closing in 1923. A final attempt was made by the Vivianna Mining Company in 1942 with a rotary Gould furnace for refining, but it failed in 1944.

Miners were all Mexicans, with only three American employees. The miners built their own shelters from rocks and brush, building more substantial houses as time, money and materials permitted. These have fallen into ruin.

The concrete and stucco houses built by the Vivianna Mining Company in 1942-43 were probably never occupied. Miners and refinery workers suffered severe health problems as a result of exposure to mercury. Miners worked six days a week, earning from $1 to $1.50 per ten-hour shift, obtaining most of their needs through the company store at the site.

== Description ==
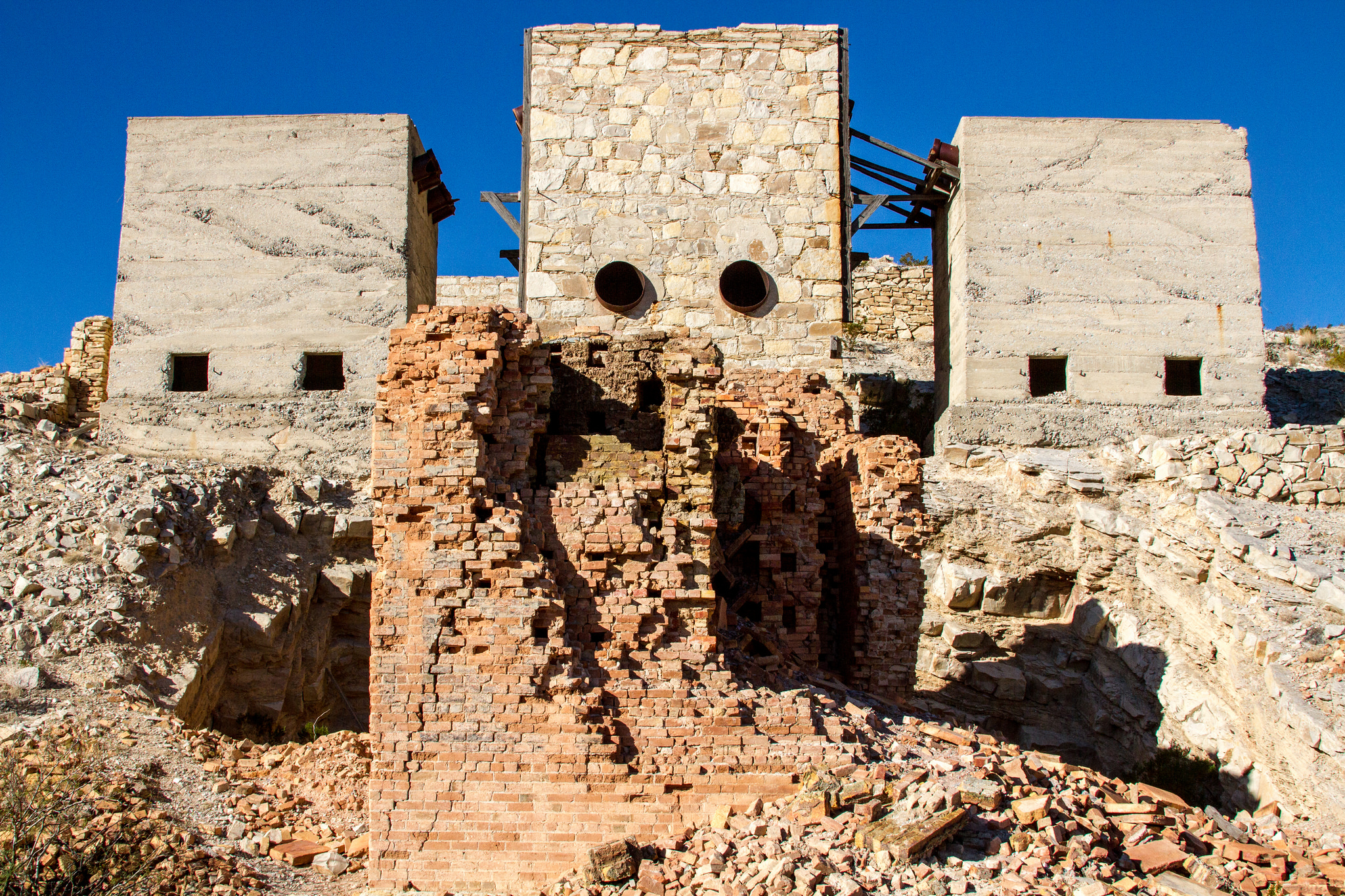
Mariscal Mine, Scott furnace in foreground.

Located below the main mineshaft entrance in the side of Mariscal Mountain, the Mariscal Mine refining plant is now ruinous. Most of the mining machinery was sold and taken off the site in the 1940s and 1950s. A significant amount of mercury was recovered from the brick lining of the Scott furnace. The remaining structures are roofless and doorless. The chief remaining structures are the holding bins, furnace, condensing chambers and stack. A number of mine shafts exist in the area. Worker housing and other structures that formerly existed in the area have collapsed or disappeared. Structures and shafts are scattered over a considerable area. The historic district comprises 640 acres (260 ha).

The Mariscal Mine was listed on the National Register of Historic Places on September 13, 1974.

== See also ==
- National Register of Historic Places listings in Big Bend National Park
- National Register of Historic Places listings in Brewster County, Texas
