= Boquillas Port of Entry =

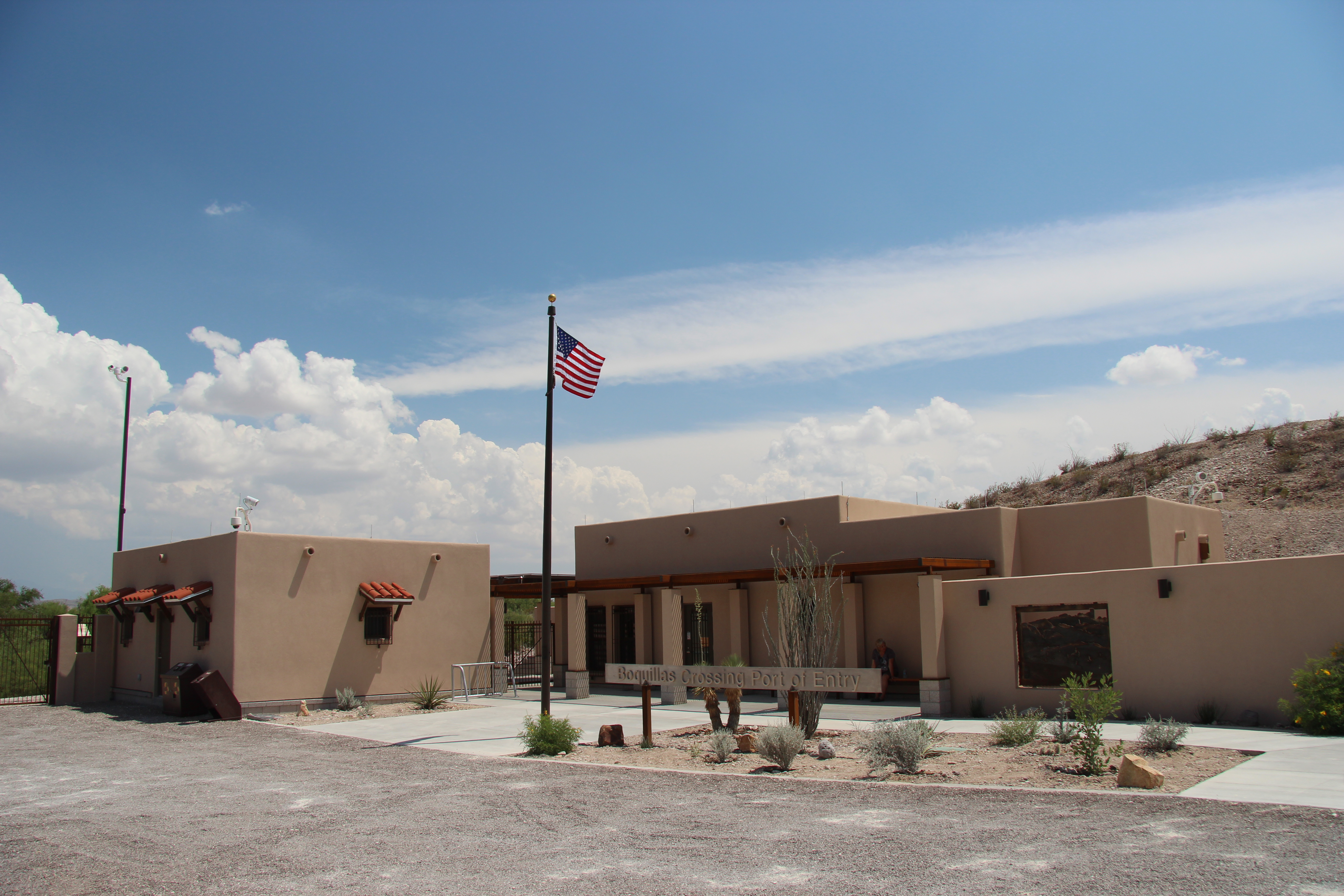

Locaiton
- Country: United States
- Location: Big Bend National Park, Big Bend, Texas 79834
- Coordinates: 29.190093°N 102.946545°W

Details
- Opened: 2013

Statistics
- 2020 Cars: 0
- 2020 Trucks: 0
- 2020 Pedestrians: 8,319

The Boquillas Port of Entry is a port of entry into the United States from the town of Boquillas del Carmen, Coahuila, Mexico, into Big Bend National Park, West Texas. Having opened in April 2013, the port of entry is unstaffed by Customs and Border Protection agents, but at least one National Park Service employee is present while the port of entry is open. Persons entering from Mexico must report to the video inspection kiosks, while crossing of the Rio Grande may be accomplished by foot, rowboat or burro.

Previously, the port of entry had been an informal border crossing for several decades, but was closed in May 2002. It is the only unstaffed legal border crossing on the Mexico–United States border and one of five pedestrian-only border crossings in the United States. Others include the Nogales-Morley Gate Port of Entry, the Cross Border Xpress at Tijuana International Airport, the PedWest component of the San Ysidro Port of Entry, and Goat Haunt in Glacier National Park

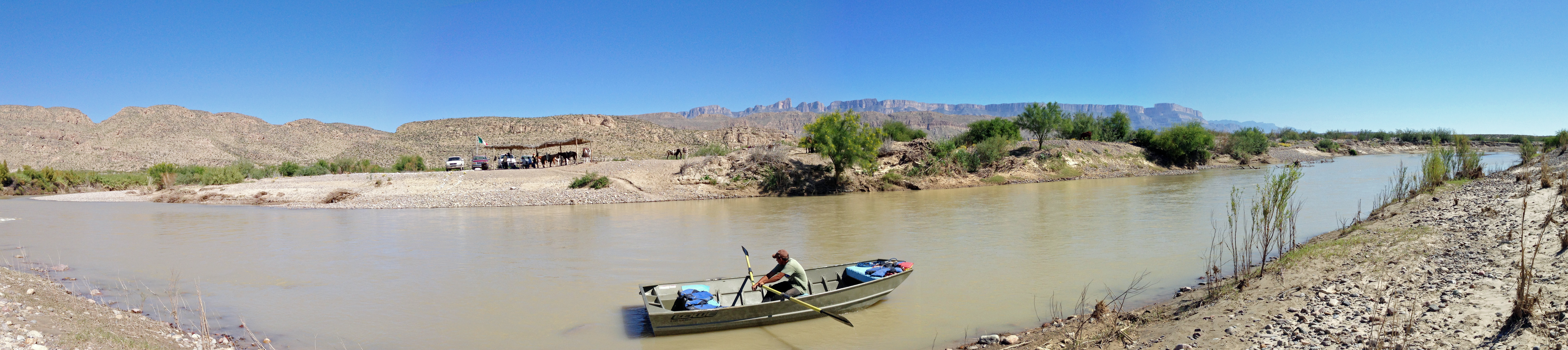
The official crossing location looking into Mexico from the United States

== History ==
The Boquillas Port of Entry existed for decades as an informal and unenforced crossing point between Mexico and Texas, used by people from both countries.

== See also ==
- List of Mexico–United States border crossings
