= ¡Ay Caramba! (album) =

Studio album by Ska Cubano
- Released: 4 July 2005
- Genre: World; reggae; ska; salsa
- Length: 60:38
- Label: Casinosounds; Cumbancha

Ska Cubano chronology
Ska Cubano (2003)	¡Ay Caramba! (2005)	Ajiaco! The Remix Album (2008)

Professional ratings
Review scores
Source	Rating
About.com	5/5 stars
AllMusic	4/5 stars
The Guardian	3/5 stars

¡Ay Caramba! is the second studio album by English group Ska Cubano, released on 4 July 2005 by Casinosounds. It was released in the US by independent label Cumbancha. The album mixes Jamaican ska, Afro-Cuban son, retro swing, salsa and Colombian cumbia.

== Critical reception ==
Steve Hands of musicOMH wrote that the album "possesses the grainy authenticism of goodtimey Ska, just before the euphoria of Jamaican independence subsided, full of tall tales, late-nite shebeens, rum, and rhumba". Brent Hagerman of Exclaim! called the album "a pan-Caribbean jam from the early '60s that never had a chance to happen since the Cuban revolution largely cut off musical ties between Cuba and the rest of the Caribbean".

== Track listing ==
Original 2005 track listing
No.	Title	Length
1.	"Istanbul (Not Constantinople)"	2:34
2.	"Tabu"	3:32
3.	"Oye Compay Juan"	3:35
4.	"No Me Desesperes"	3:34
5.	"Tungarara"	3:50
6.	"Big Bamboo"	2:59
7.	"Cachita"	4:31
8.	"Soy Campesino"	3:42
9.	"Jezebel"	3:20
10.	"Marianao"	3:52
11.	"¡Ay Caramba!"	3:02
12.	"Chispa Tren"	3:22
13.	"Bobine"	4:56
14.	"Cumbia en Do Menor"	4:41
15.	"Natty Bo Dead (Sammy No Dead)"	2:36
16.	"Jezebel" (instrumental; bonus track)	3:18
17.	"La Boquilla" (bonus track)	3:14
Total length:		60:38

2006 US release track listing
No.	Title	Length
1.	"Soy Campesino (I'm a Country Man)"	3:42
2.	"¡Ay Caramba!"	3:02
3.	"Tabu (Taboo)"	3:32
4.	"Oye Compay Juan (Listen, My Buddy Juan)"	3:35
5.	"No Me Desesperes (Don't Drive Me Crazy)"	3:34
6.	"Big Bamboo (Gran Bambu)"	2:59
7.	"Tungarara"	3:50
8.	"Cachita"	4:31
9.	"Istanbul (Not Constantinople)"	2:35
10.	"Marianao"	3:51
11.	"Chispa Tren"	3:22
12.	"Jezebel"	3:20
13.	"Bobine"	4:56
14.	"Cumbia en Do Menor (Cumbia In C Minor)"	4:41
Total length:		51:30
