= Boquillas del Carmen =

Village in the Mexican state of Coahuila

Boquillas del Carmen (Boquillas)
- Village
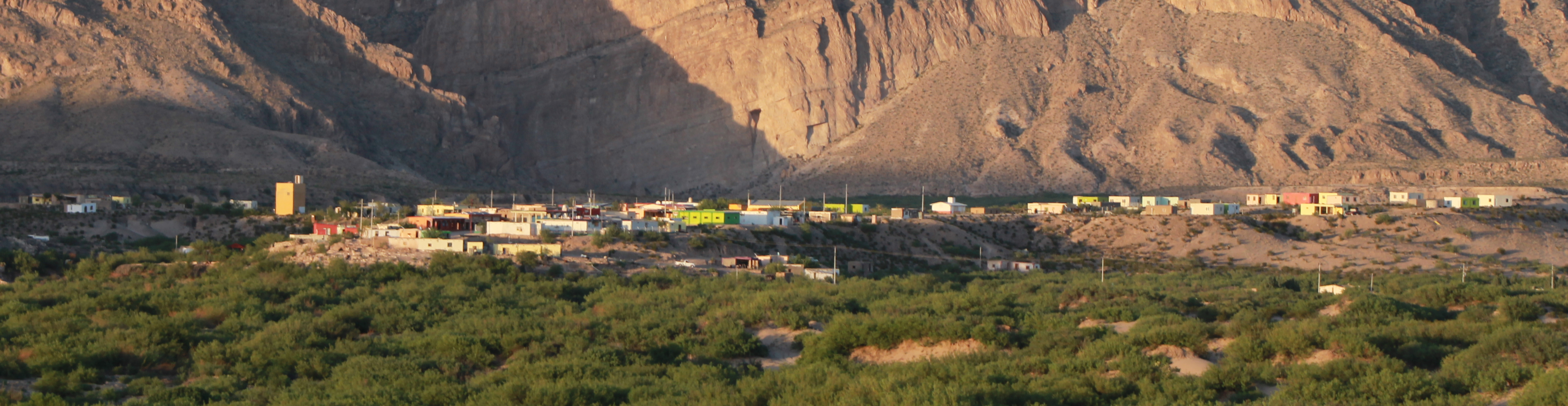
- View of Boquillas from Big Bend National Park

- Location in Mexico
- Coordinates: 29°11′15″N 102°56′14″W
- Country: Mexico
- State: Coahuila
- Municipality: Ocampo
- Founded: 1890s
- Elevation: 564 m (1,850 ft)

Population (2020)
  - Total: 202
- Time zone: UTC-06:00 (CST)
  - Summer (DST): UTC-05:00 (CDT)

Boquillas del Carmen, frequently known simply as Boquillas (Spanish pronunciation: [bo-ki-ʝas]), is a village in northern Mexico on the banks of the Rio Grande. It is the northernmost populated place in the municipality of Ocampo, which lies within the Mexican state of Coahuila.

The village lies immediately west of the northern part of the Sierra del Carmen mountain range and at the south-west end of the Rio Grande's Boquillas Canyon. Boquillas del Carmen was founded as a mining town in the late 19th-century, after valuable minerals were found in the nearby mountains. Mining ceased in 1919 and the population rapidly declined.

Boquillas del Carmen lies adjacent to the Mexico–United States border and visitors on foot from the United States can enter the village via the Boquillas Port of Entry. Situated just next to Big Bend National Park, tourism is the principal industry in Boquillas. After the September 11 attacks, the United States closed the border and the economy of Boquillas was severely affected and the population fell by nearly 50%. In 2013, the border was re-opened and the economy and population subsequently rebounded. From 2020 to 2021, the crossing was closed due to the COVID-19 pandemic.

== History ==
=== 19th century ===
Silver was discovered in the Sierra del Carmen in the early 1890s. The arrival of miners led to the establishment of two border camps either side of the Rio Grande: Boquillas in Texas (now Rio Grande Village) and Boquillas del Carmen. In addition to the silver, lead and zinc were also discovered. The mined ore containing these metals was smelted in a small furnace by the banks of the river near Boquillas del Carmen before being transported by road to El Paso where it was further processed. The local mining company operated a cable car across the Rio Grande between the two Boquillas. At the height of mining operations, there were between 2,000 and 4,000 people living in Boquillas del Carmen.

=== 20th century ===
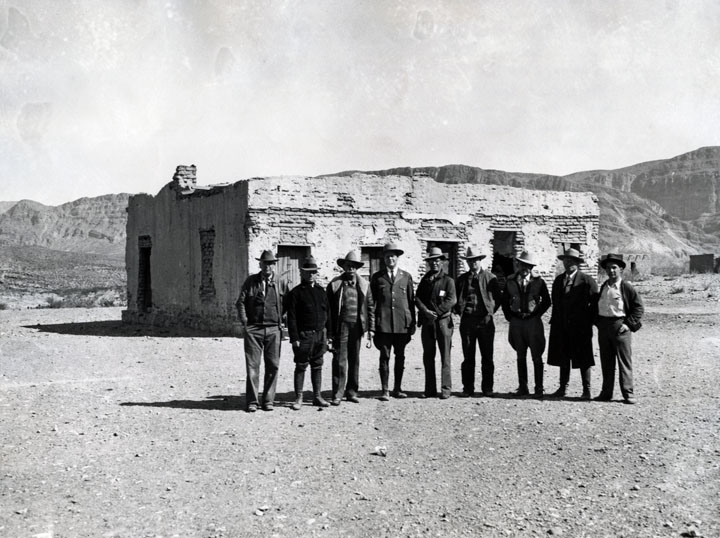
Members of the joint United States and Mexico International Park Commission at Boquillas in 1936.

Around the turn of the 20th century up to 2000 people lived in Boquillas. The principal employment came from industries relating to the production of lead, silver and fluorite ore from nearby mines. Mining ceased in 1919 and the town's population rapidly declined.

Efforts began in the 1930s to create a United States-Mexico International Peace Park in the area, joining Big Bend National Park with the Maderas del Carmen in Coahuila. Boquillas del Carmen would have been at the center of this proposed international peace park, but these efforts have not been realized.

External image
- Photograph of Boquillas in 1936. While some houses are built of local flagstone, others are made of adobe, while others are made from a mixture of the two.

Despite this, Boquillas del Carmen interacted with Big Bend in other ways. Tourism from across the Rio Grande became the main trade. Country music star Robert Earl Keen was known to have frequented Boquillas and released an album in 1994 entitled Gringo Honeymoon whose title track is said to be about a day he and a female companion visited the village. During the 2000 census, the town's population was calculated as comprising 191 people.

=== 21st century ===
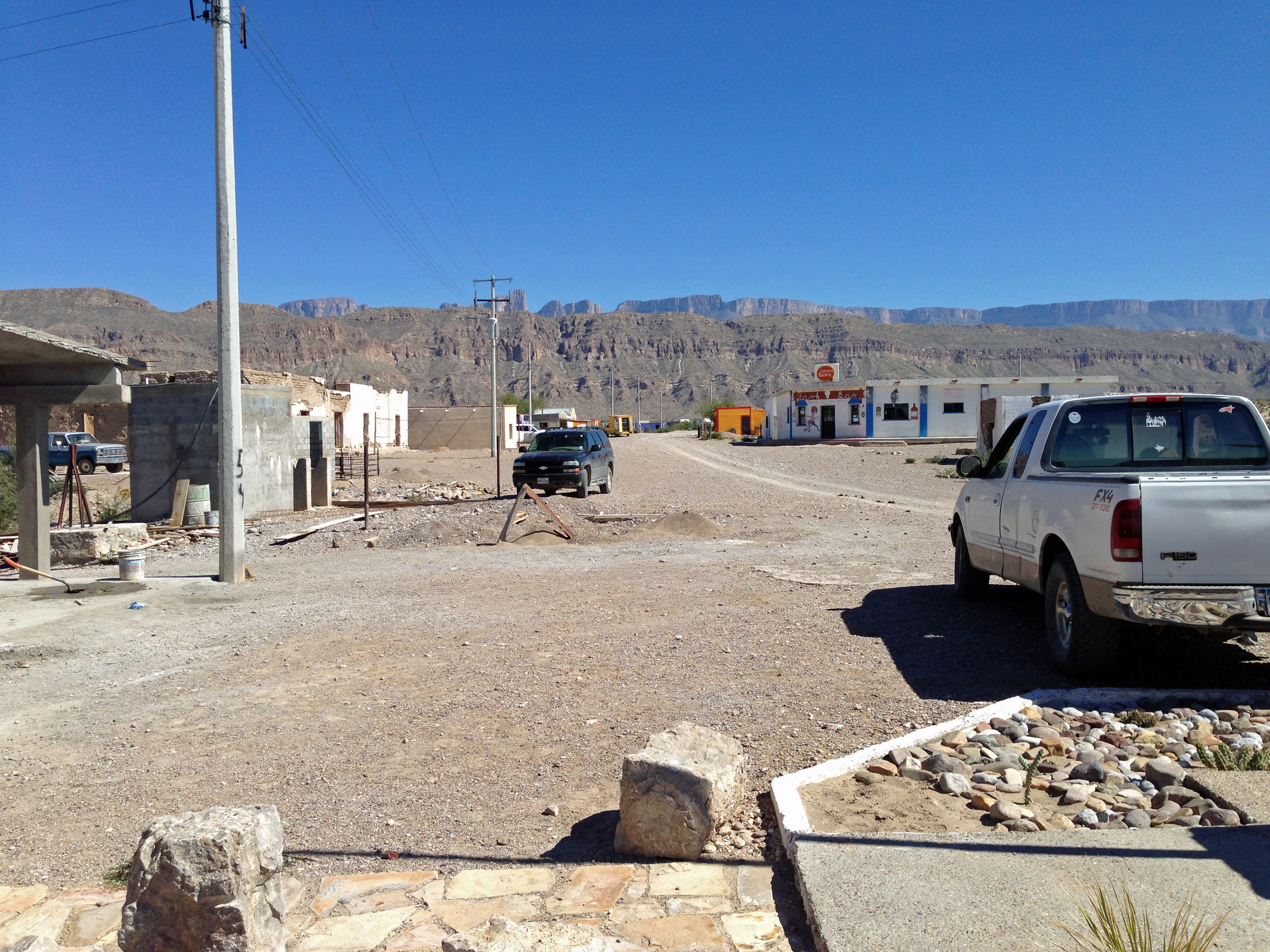
Boquillas del Carmen, October 2013

The events of September 11, 2001, dramatically affected Boquillas del Carmen's 20th-century way of life. In May 2002, the border crossing from Big Bend National Park to Boquillas was closed indefinitely. By October 2006, only 19 families comprising around 90 to 100 residents remained in Boquillas. Most of the town's residents had been forced to move away by the closure of the tourist crossing and destruction of the town's traditional economy. At the time of the 2010 census, the town's population was recorded as comprising only 110 people.

On January 7, 2011, the US National Park Service announced plans to reopen the crossing using a ferry and a passport control center planned to open in the spring of 2012. After multiple delays, the new Boquillas Port of Entry was finally officially opened on 10 April 2013. The then US Secretary of the Interior, Ken Salazar, played an instrumental role in getting the border crossing re-opened.

The hours of operation currently are 9 a.m. to 6 p.m., Wednesday through Sunday, subject to seasonal changes. Since opening of the border crossing, the town of Boquillas del Carmen has seen substantial growth with the addition of electricity (from solar panels), a new medical care office, and enhancements at the public elementary school. Visitors are allowed to bring one bottle of alcohol back to the U.S. via this entry point. One may not bring tobacco back to the U.S. via this entry point.

In response to the COVID-19 pandemic, the US authorities closed the Boquillas Port of Entry on March 17, 2020. It was reopened in November 2021.

== Economy ==
After the end of the mining industry, tourism developed in Boquillas in the 20th century with Jose Falcon's restaurant opening in 1973. In the late 1990s, Boquillas was a small town of around 300 residents primarily dependent on the Big Bend tourist trade with visitors crossing the Rio Grande to visit the village's bar, restaurant, and taco stands. Children posted adjacent to the village's Christian mission sold rocks collected in the desert or from nearby caves. Tourism options included pony and donkey rentals, drinks at Park Bar and overnight stays at a local bed and breakfast known as the Buzzard's Roost (since renamed as La Zappolita).

The village continues to generate its income from tourists visiting on foot and in 2018 over 11,000 entered Boquillas from the United States. Local guides offer walking tours of the small village and locally produced handicrafts are on sale. Tours to the Boquillas Canyon, hot springs, archaeological sites and caves in the surrounding area by foot, truck, horse/burro, and canoe are also available.

There are at least two restaurants/bars in the village and several curio shops selling mostly bead craft work.

Los Diablos, a firefighting team, lives in Boquillas. They work in the national park where they fight wildfires and sometimes support firefighting efforts in the United States.

== Infrastructure ==
In 2015 a solar farm was brought into operation, providing electricity throughout the village.

Apart from the river crossing to Big Bend, Boquillas can be reached by road along Mexican Federal Highway 53. The nearest settlement of any size is Santa Rosa de Múzquiz which is 240 km (150 mi) away with a journey time of at least 4 hours on account of the poor road condition.

In 2013, it was noted that there was no mobile phone coverage or internet provision in Boquillas. A single telephone line now comes into the village. When one calls that line, the operator states a specific time at which the caller should call back, promising that the operator will find the person being telephoned and ensure that he/she is at the phone in order to receive the call at the appointed time.

== Demographics ==
Historical population
Year	Pop.	±%
1990	187	—
2000	191	+2.1%
2010	110	−42.4%
2020	202	+83.6%
Source: XI Censo General de Población y Vivienda 1990, XII Censo General de Población y Vivienda 2000, Censo de Población y Vivienda 2010, Censo de Población y Vivienda 2020

From 1990 to 2010, the population has never been officially recorded as over 200 and it suffered over a 40% drop over the period. By 2017 the population was estimated to have grown to around 300 people although the 2020 official census recorded a more modest growth to a population of 202 people.

The village has a Roman Catholic church and a small Baptist church (Boquillas Bautista Iglesia). In 2010 the religious breakdown of Boquillas del Carmen was:

- Roman Catholic - 59 (53.6%)
- Protestant/Evangelical/Biblical Christians - 44 (40.0%)
- No religion/Atheist - 6 (5.4%)

In 2020 the religious breakdown of was:

- Roman Catholic - 74 (37%)
- Protestant/Evangelical - 84 (42%)
- Other religion - 0 (0%)
- No religion/No religious affiliation - 42 (21%)

== Climate ==
Boquillas del Carmen

Climate chart (precipitation, max. and min. temperature)
J	F	M	A	M	J	J	A	S	O	N	D
15 18 6	15 20 5	13 30 13	14 37 17	42 41 21	48 44 24	58 40 23	44 40 23	124 37 21	35 33 17	40 25 13	6 19 8
- █ Average max. and min. temperatures in °C
- █ Precipitation totals in mm
Imperial conversion
J	F	M	A	M	J	J	A	S	O	N	D
0.6 64 43	0.6 68 41	0.5 86 55	0.6 99 63	1.7 106 70	1.9 111 75	2.3 104 73	1.7 104 73	4.9 99 70	1.4 91 63	1.6 77 55	0.2 66 46
- █ Average max. and min. temperatures in °F
- █ Precipitation totals in inches
