= Boquillas Canyon =

Canyon in Texas, United States

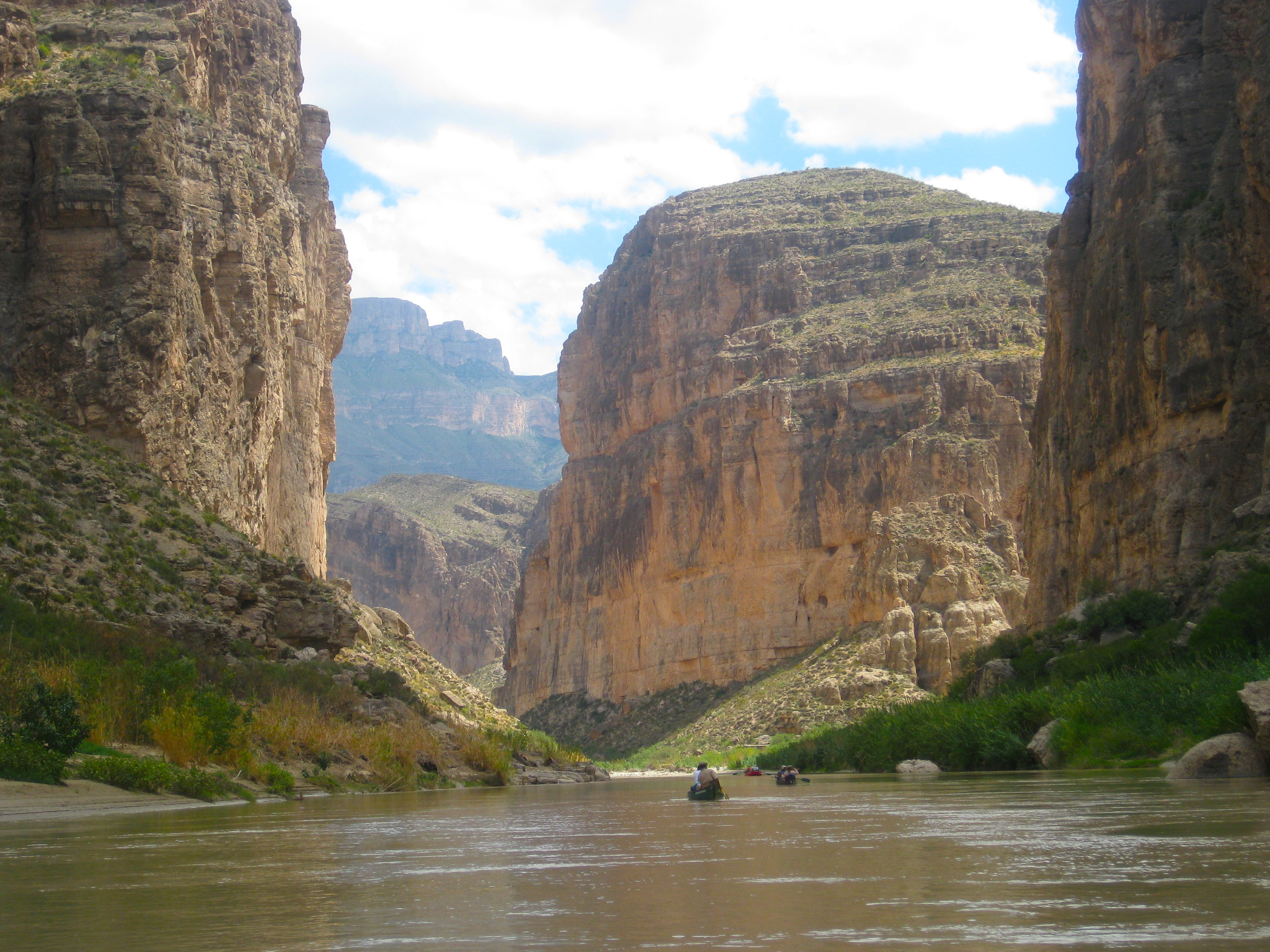
- Canoeing into Boquillas Canyon

- Location within Texas

Geography
- Coordinates: 29°12′04″N 102°54′52″W
- Interactive map of Boquillas Canyon

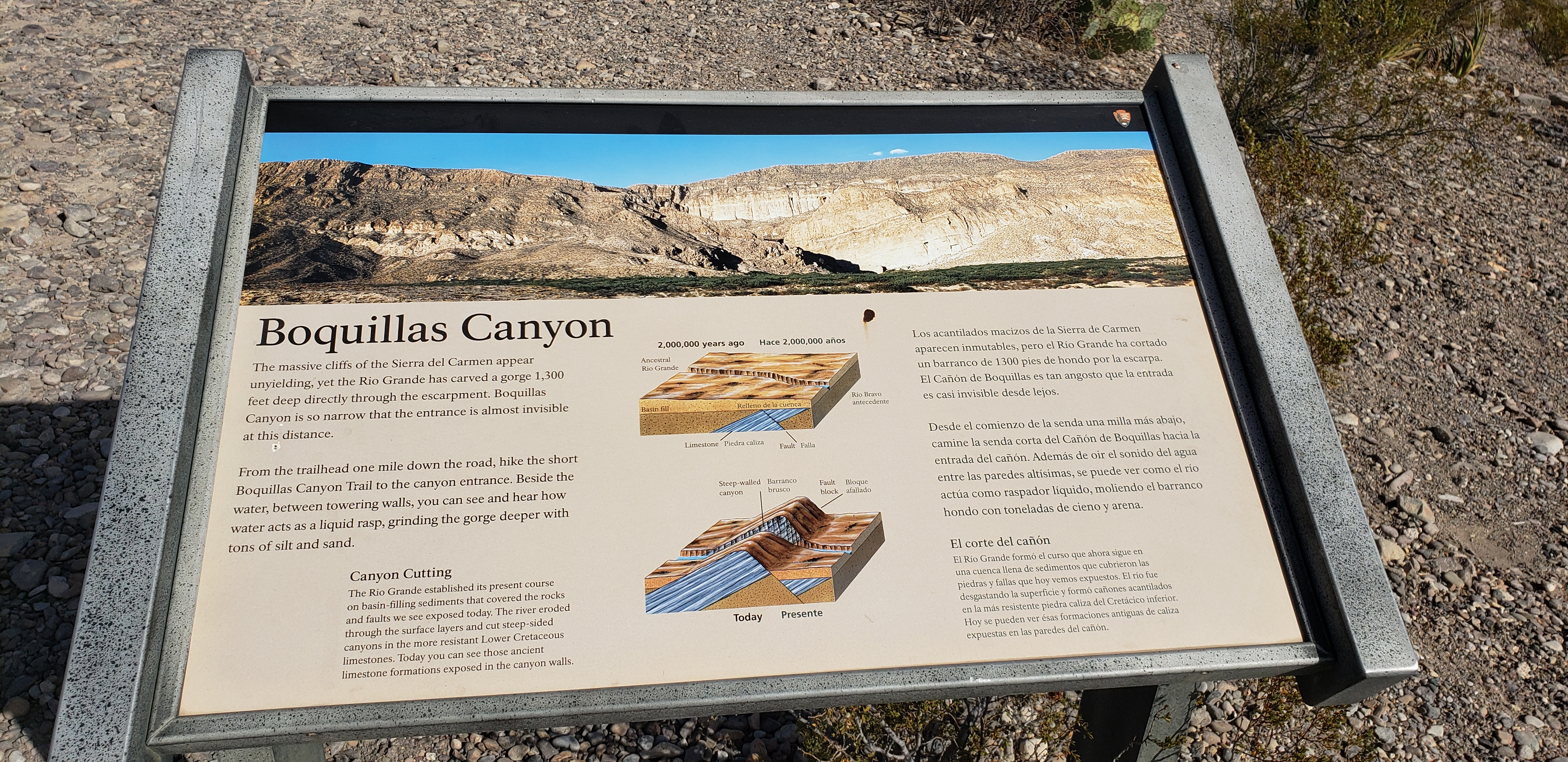
Geology of Boquillas Canyon

Boquillas Canyon is a canyon in the Big Bend National Park. The canyon walls are 1,500 ft high and carved out of thick layers of limestone. The canyon length is a matter of some debate, with estimates ranging from 5 miles to 17 miles, depending on the chosen endpoint. The Rio Grande river currents through the canyon are rated up to Class II.

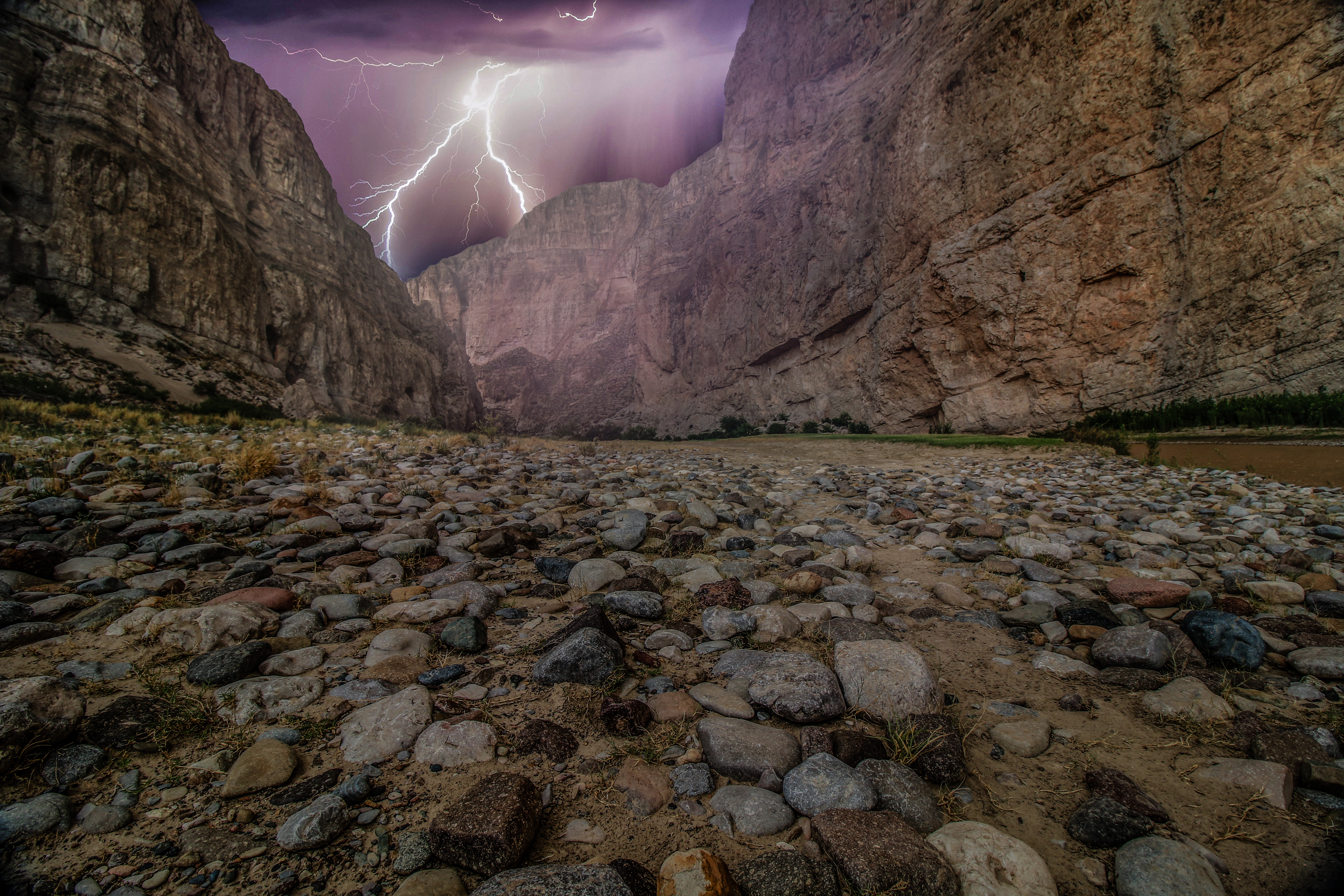
Boquillas Canyon during a lightning storm

== Etymology ==
Boquillas means "little mouths" in Spanish, perhaps a reference to the canyon's narrow mouth.
