= Castolon =

- Castolon Historic District
- U.S. National Register of Historic Places
- U.S. Historic district
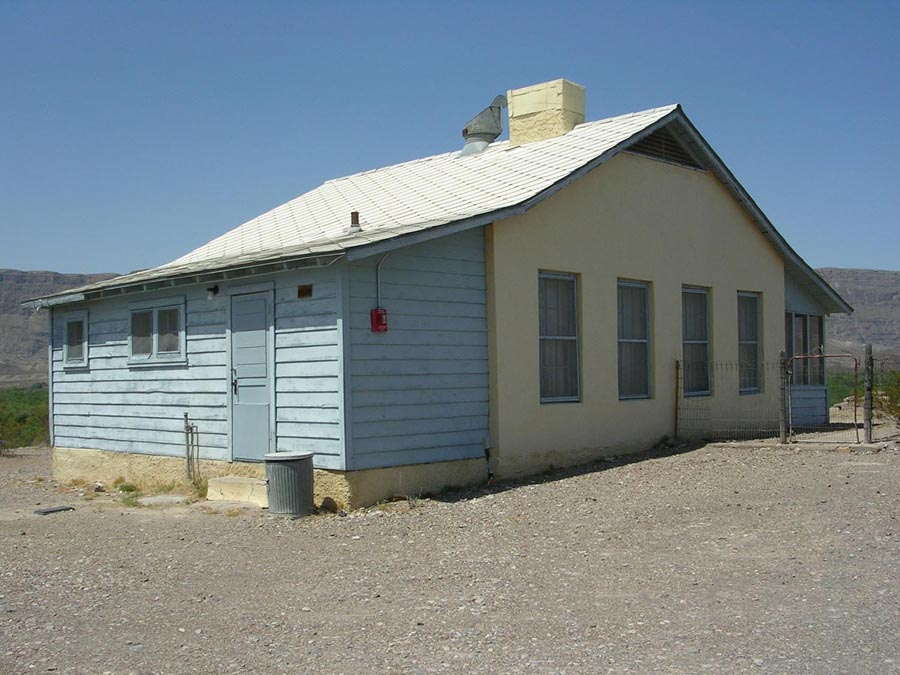
- Army Officers' Quarters, Castolon

- Location within Texas Location within the United States
- Location: Along Rio Grande at jct. of Park Rtes. 5, 9, and 35, Big Bend National Park, Texas
- Coordinates: 29°7′48″N 103°30′47″W
- Area: 800 acres (320 ha)
- NRHP reference No.: 74000276
- Added to NRHP: September 6, 1974

Castolon, also known as La Harmonia Ranch and Campo Santa Helena, is a tourist ghost town in southwestern Texas, United States, located in what is now Big Bend National Park along the Rio Grande. The location was first settled in 1901 by Cipriano Hernandez, who farmed the area and built the original Castolon Store, now known as the Alvino House.

== History ==
The area began to attract refugees from nearby Mexico who were fleeing the Mexican Revolution of 1910. The Castolon area was the site on a U.S. Army encampment, called Campo Santa Helena, to house units patrolling the Mexican–American border. However, by the time the camp was complete in 1920 the border was quiet and the camp buildings were never used by the Army. In 1921 the La Harmonia Company was established in the barracks, operating a trading post and farming cotton. The La Harmonia Company was established in 1918 by Howard Perry, who owned the Chisos Mining Company in Terlingua, in partnership with Wayne Cartledge. Cartledge and his son Eugene chose the name and managed the company. The La Harmonia Company lasted until 1961, when it was sold to the National Park Service. The store was heavily damaged in a fire in May 2019.

=== 2019 Fire ===
On May 22, 2019, a fire started a day earlier in Mexico jumped the Rio Grande. Due to strong winds, temperatures around 110 °F, and low humidity, the fire spread rapidly. A sudden wind direction change with strong gusts "showered embers across the Castolon Historic District, igniting the latrine building and barracks (which housed the La Harmonia Store and Visitor Center)". This resulted in widespread damage to both buildings.

== Description ==
Castolon is divided into two areas. "Old Castolon" comprises the Old Castolon Store, a cafe-residence and a shed. The Army Compound includes a barracks, now the Castolon Store, a recreation hall, latrine, two officers' residences, a granary and tack room, and the Magdalena, Garlick and Alvino residences. The Magdalena and Garlick houses post-date the Army construction and are associated with La Harmonia Ranch, while the Alvino house pre-dates the Army. All of the buildings are built with adobe walls, and most are roofed with corrugated metal roofing. A few use traditional vigas, latillas and a soil roof covering.

Castolon was placed on the National Register of Historic Places on September 6, 1974.

== Climate ==
- Coordinates: 29.13444°N 103.515°W
- Elevation: 2,169 feet (661 m)

Climate data for Castolon, Texas, 1991–2020 normals, extremes 1947–present
Month	Jan	Feb	Mar	Apr	May	Jun	Jul	Aug	Sep	Oct	Nov	Dec	Year
Record high °F (°C)	92 (33)	98 (37)	105 (41)	109 (43)	115 (46)	117 (47)	115 (46)	114 (46)	111 (44)	105 (41)	99 (37)	93 (34)	117 (47)
Mean maximum °F (°C)	84.4 (29.1)	91.0 (32.8)	98.0 (36.7)	103.5 (39.7)	109.3 (42.9)	112.9 (44.9)	110.5 (43.6)	108.5 (42.5)	104.8 (40.4)	100.5 (38.1)	92.1 (33.4)	83.6 (28.7)	113.3 (45.2)
Mean daily maximum °F (°C)	68.9 (20.5)	75.4 (24.1)	83.3 (28.5)	92.2 (33.4)	99.9 (37.7)	104.3 (40.2)	102.2 (39.0)	101.7 (38.7)	96.0 (35.6)	89.3 (31.8)	77.7 (25.4)	69.1 (20.6)	88.3 (31.3)
Daily mean °F (°C)	52.4 (11.3)	58.5 (14.7)	65.8 (18.8)	74.6 (23.7)	83.4 (28.6)	89.4 (31.9)	88.8 (31.6)	88.5 (31.4)	82.9 (28.3)	74.2 (23.4)	61.6 (16.4)	52.9 (11.6)	72.8 (22.6)
Mean daily minimum °F (°C)	35.9 (2.2)	41.6 (5.3)	48.3 (9.1)	57.0 (13.9)	67.0 (19.4)	74.5 (23.6)	75.4 (24.1)	75.2 (24.0)	69.8 (21.0)	59.1 (15.1)	45.6 (7.6)	36.8 (2.7)	57.2 (14.0)
Mean minimum °F (°C)	24.8 (−4.0)	28.2 (−2.1)	35.1 (1.7)	43.9 (6.6)	54.8 (12.7)	65.5 (18.6)	68.3 (20.2)	68.3 (20.2)	58.5 (14.7)	43.6 (6.4)	31.6 (−0.2)	24.7 (−4.1)	21.9 (−5.6)
Record low °F (°C)	7 (−14)	5 (−15)	22 (−6)	28 (−2)	44 (7)	56 (13)	60 (16)	61 (16)	47 (8)	29 (−2)	21 (−6)	7 (−14)	5 (−15)
Average precipitation inches (mm)	0.36 (9.1)	0.33 (8.4)	0.29 (7.4)	0.37 (9.4)	0.79 (20)	1.38 (35)	1.71 (43)	1.51 (38)	1.55 (39)	0.81 (21)	0.48 (12)	0.28 (7.1)	9.86 (249.4)
Average precipitation days (≥ 0.01 in)	2.5	1.9	1.4	1.8	3.9	4.8	6.4	4.9	4.7	3.4	1.8	2.4	39.9
Source 1: NOAA
Source 2: National Weather Service

== See also ==
- National Register of Historic Places listings in Big Bend National Park
- National Register of Historic Places listings in Brewster County, Texas
