= Boquillas, Texas =

- Village
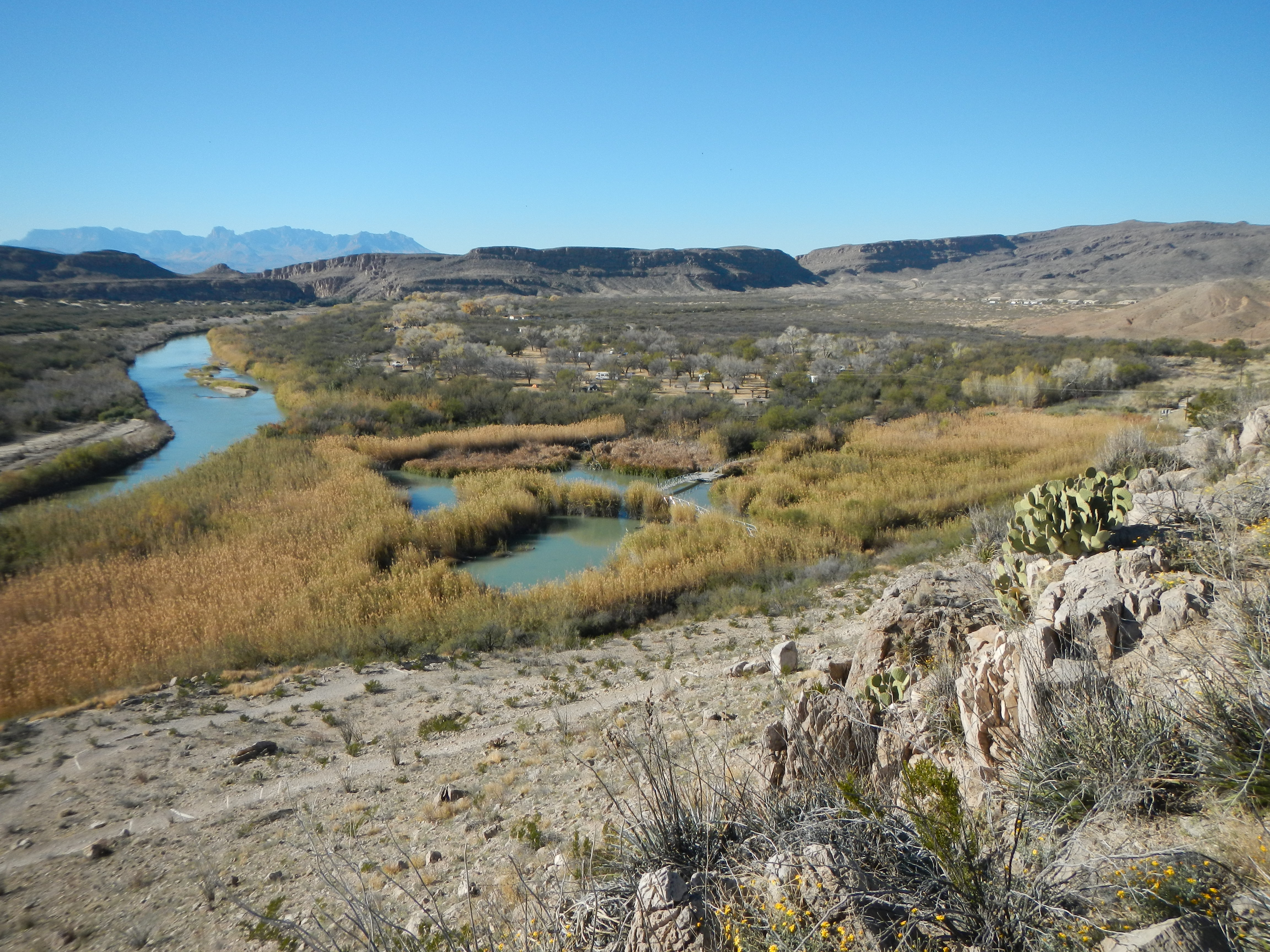
- Boquillas in Big Bend
- Nickname: Rio Grande Village
- Location within Texas Boquillas, Texas (the United States)
- Coordinates: 29°10′58″N 102°57′41.5″W
- Country: United States
- State: Texas
- County: Brewster
- Elevation: 1,844 ft (562 m)
- Time zone: UTC-6 (Central (CST))
  - Summer (DST): UTC-5 (CDT)
- ZIP codes: 79834
- Area code: 432
- GNIS feature ID: 2034469

Boquillas was a small settlement in Texas, United States, located on the northern banks of the Rio Grande. It was located within Brewster County, five miles (8 km) northeast of San Vicente. The place existed to service the mining operations at Boquillas del Carmen, Mexico, just across the Rio Grande.

Between 1901 and 1936, María G. Sada ran "Chata's Place", the only store and restaurant in the Boquillas area at that time.

Boquillas is now in Big Bend National Park. It is now usually known as Rio Grande Village, and consists of a ranger station and other buildings to serve visitors to the park.

The Rio Grande border crossing to Boquillas del Carmen was closed in 2002. On January 7, 2011, the U.S. National Park Service announced plans to reopen the crossing. After multiple delays, the unmanned border station was finally opened on April 11, 2013.

== Geographic points of interest ==
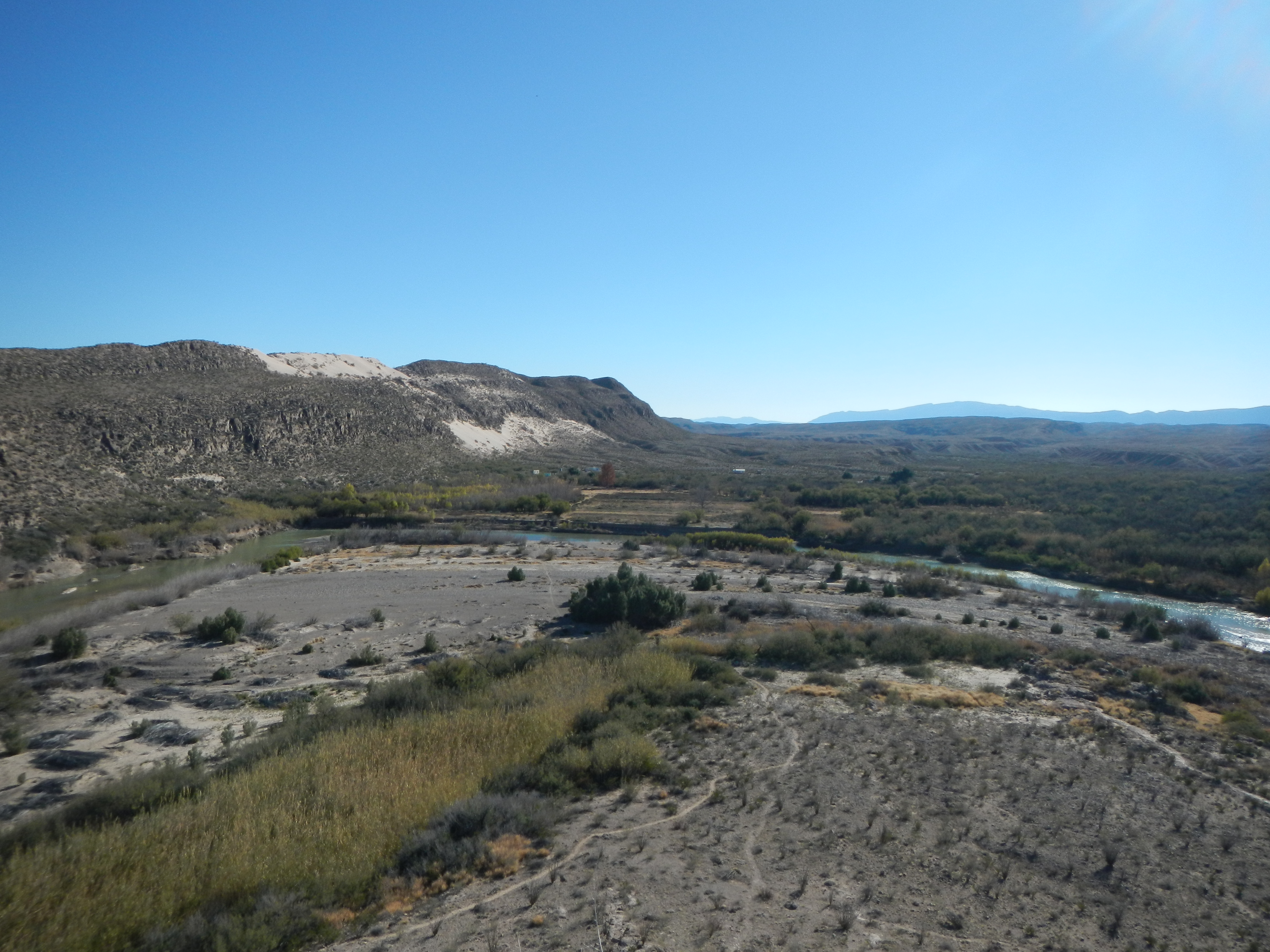
Overlook of Rio Grande Village in Big Bend National Park, Texas.

- Chisos Mountains
- Emory Peak
- Mariscal Mine
- Sierra del Carmen

== Climate ==
The Köppen climate classification system categorizes Boquillas as a semiarid climate.

Climate data for Boquillas (Rio Grande Village), Texas, 1991–2020 normals, extremes 1910–present
Month	Jan	Feb	Mar	Apr	May	Jun	Jul	Aug	Sep	Oct	Nov	Dec	Year
Record high °F (°C)	92 (33)	102 (39)	108 (42)	112 (44)	116 (47)	119 (48)	116 (47)	116 (47)	115 (46)	106 (41)	99 (37)	96 (36)	119 (48)
Mean maximum °F (°C)	86.4 (30.2)	92.3 (33.5)	98.2 (36.8)	104.8 (40.4)	110.2 (43.4)	112.9 (44.9)	110.8 (43.8)	109.1 (42.8)	105.8 (41.0)	101.6 (38.7)	92.3 (33.5)	84.8 (29.3)	113.7 (45.4)
Mean daily maximum °F (°C)	70.2 (21.2)	75.9 (24.4)	84.5 (29.2)	92.8 (33.8)	100.1 (37.8)	104.8 (40.4)	102.8 (39.3)	101.6 (38.7)	96.8 (36.0)	89.3 (31.8)	77.9 (25.5)	69.8 (21.0)	88.9 (31.6)
Daily mean °F (°C)	49.9 (9.9)	56.0 (13.3)	64.6 (18.1)	72.5 (22.5)	81.8 (27.7)	88.4 (31.3)	87.4 (30.8)	86.4 (30.2)	81.1 (27.3)	71.6 (22.0)	59.3 (15.2)	50.5 (10.3)	70.8 (21.5)
Mean daily minimum °F (°C)	29.6 (−1.3)	36.1 (2.3)	44.7 (7.1)	52.1 (11.2)	63.4 (17.4)	71.9 (22.2)	72.0 (22.2)	71.2 (21.8)	65.5 (18.6)	54.0 (12.2)	40.6 (4.8)	31.1 (−0.5)	52.7 (11.5)
Mean minimum °F (°C)	19.5 (−6.9)	23.2 (−4.9)	29.8 (−1.2)	38.3 (3.5)	49.5 (9.7)	63.3 (17.4)	67.0 (19.4)	65.6 (18.7)	53.6 (12.0)	37.5 (3.1)	26.7 (−2.9)	19.2 (−7.1)	16.1 (−8.8)
Record low °F (°C)	7 (−14)	4 (−16)	14 (−10)	29 (−2)	41 (5)	55 (13)	57 (14)	60 (16)	40 (4)	24 (−4)	16 (−9)	4 (−16)	4 (−16)
Average precipitation inches (mm)	0.41 (10)	0.41 (10)	0.27 (6.9)	0.35 (8.9)	1.04 (26)	1.32 (34)	1.45 (37)	0.86 (22)	0.67 (17)	0.95 (24)	0.65 (17)	0.30 (7.6)	8.68 (220.4)
Average precipitation days (≥ 0.01 in)	2.2	2.1	1.9	1.8	4.1	4.8	5.7	4.8	3.0	3.8	2.7	2.1	39.0
Source 1: NOAA
Source 2: NWS/XMACIS2(2007–present)(1910–2006)

Landscape depictions of Boquillas, Texas
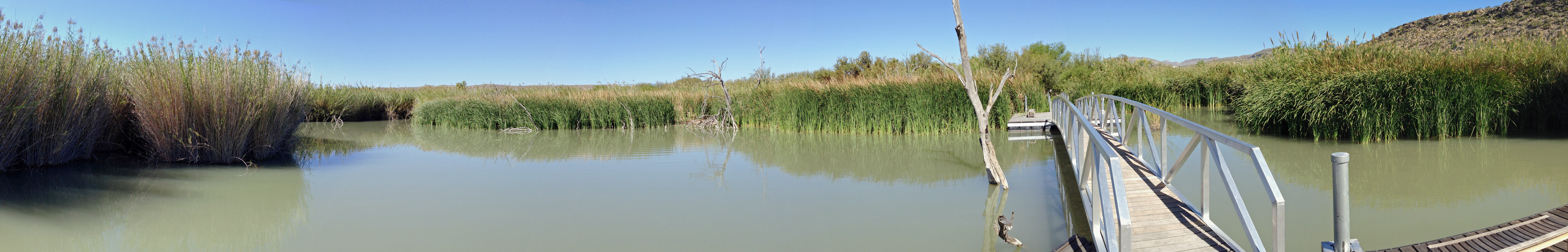
Panoramic view of marsh crossing on the Rio Grande Village Nature Trail

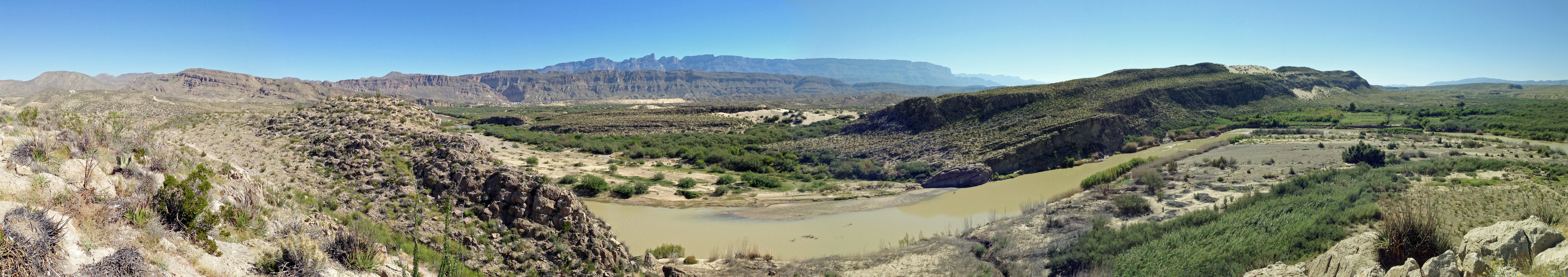
Panoramic overlook view on the Rio Grande Village Nature Trail in Big Bend National Park, Texas.
