= List of people from El Paso, Texas =

This is a list of notable people who were born in, or have lived in El Paso, Texas.

== Politics, military, and government ==
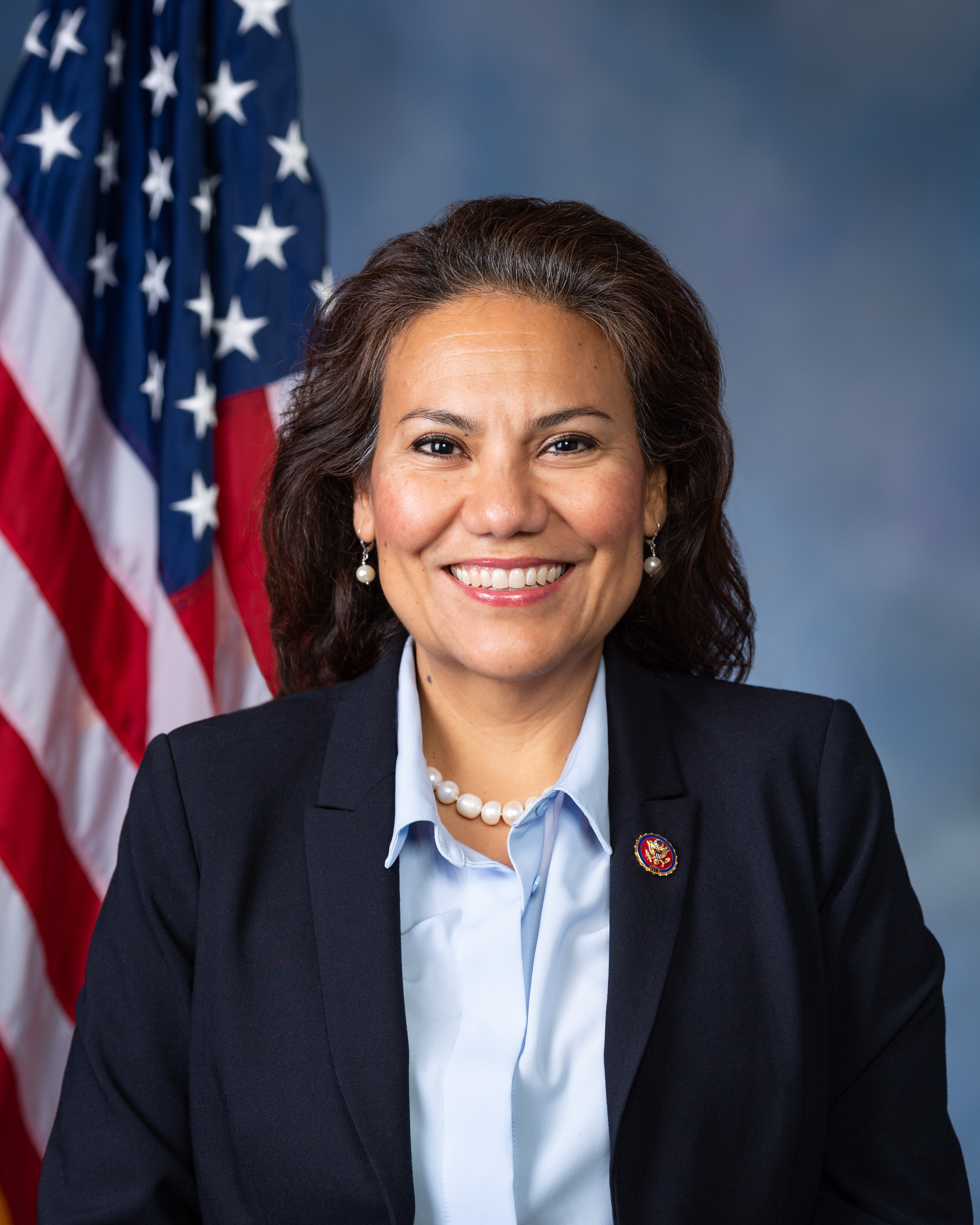
Veronica Escobar official portrait, 116th Congress

- Shirley "S.L." Abbott, Texas legislator and United States Ambassador
- Lucy G. Acosta (1926–2008), activist and political appointee.
- Oscar Zeta Acosta, attorney, writer
- Suzie Azar (born 1946), aviator, politician and first woman to serve as mayor of El Paso.
- Jeff Bingaman, former United States Senator
- Beau Boulter, politician
- Omar Bradley, Five Star General, first Chairman of the Joint Chiefs of Staff
- Wernher von Braun, German Nazi rocket scientist
- Cornell William Brooks (born 1961), president of the NAACP
- Kathleen Cardone (born 1953), United States District Judge.
- Alicia R. Chacón (born 1938), first woman elected to office in the city of El Paso.
- Ann Day, politician
- Veronica Escobar, United States Representative.
- Albert Bacon Fall, politician
- Patrick G. Forrester, astronaut
- William J. Glasgow (1866–1967), US Army brigadier general, lived and worked in El Paso
- Mary González (born 1983), state representative.
- Ambrosio Guillen, Medal of Honor recipient
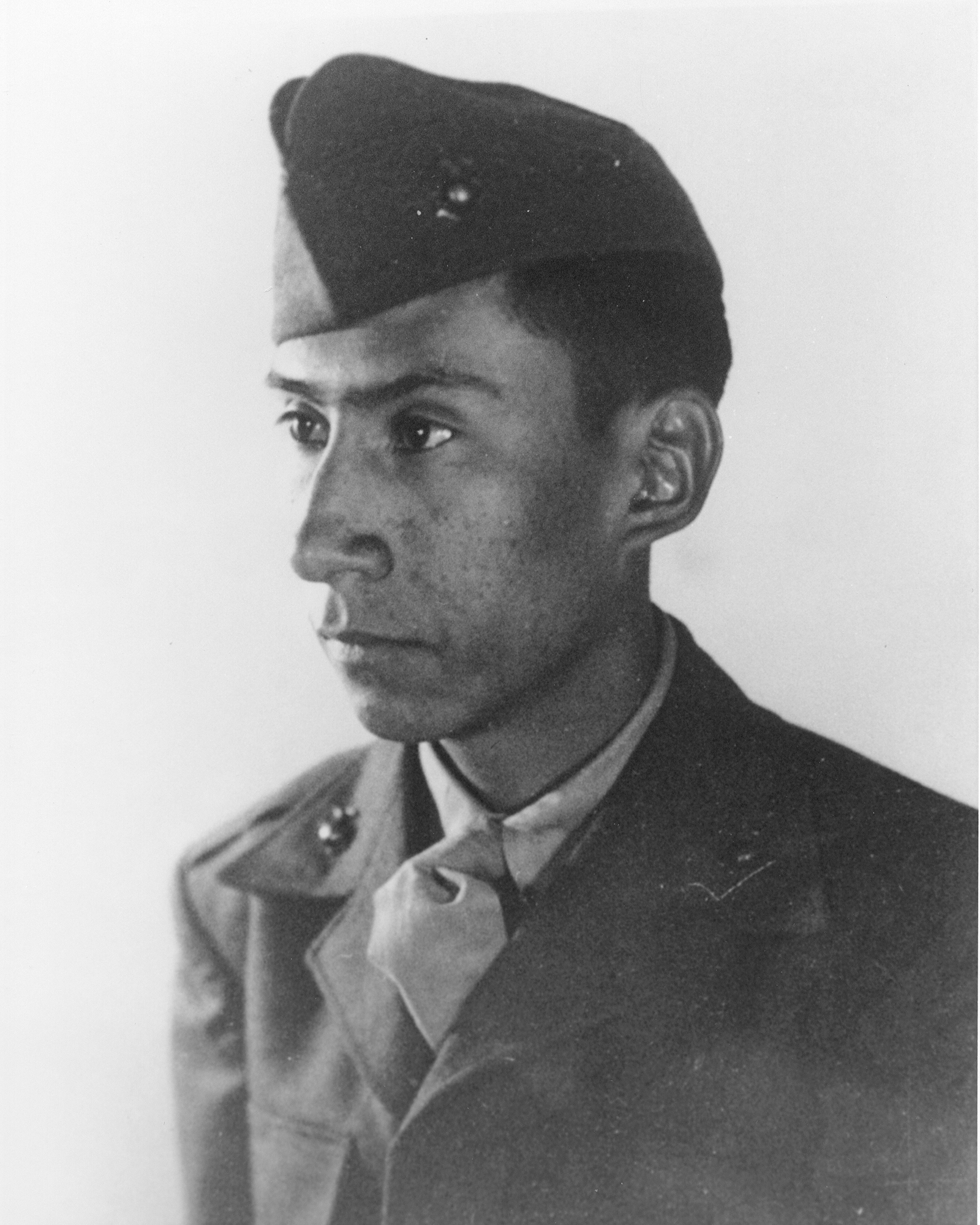
  Ambrosio Guillen, Medal of Honor recipient.
- Polly Harris (1924-1987), politician and theater enthusiast
- Victoriano Huerta, former President of Mexico
- Shoshana Johnson, POW
- Wayne Harold Johnson, Republican member of both houses, consecutively, of the Wyoming State Legislature from 1993 to 2017; born in El Paso in 1942
- Charles S. Kilburn. U.S. Army brigadier general
- Octaviano Ambrosio Larrazolo, politician
- Thomas Calloway Lea Jr., attorney, judge, Mayor of El Paso (1915–1917)
- Barbara Lee, U.S. representative for California and mayor of Oakland, California
- Oscar Leeser, Mayor of El Paso
- Virginia B. MacDonald, Illinois state legislator
- Adair Margo, Chairman, President's Committee on the Arts and Humanities
- Susana Martinez, former Governor of New Mexico
- Anson Mills, brigadier general, platted El Paso in 1859.
- Sandra Day O'Connor, Associate Justice of the Supreme Court of the United States. First woman to serve on the Supreme Court.
- John "Danny" Olivas, astronaut
- Beto O'Rourke, former member of the United States House of Representatives
- John "Black Jack" Pershing, General of the Armies
- Joseph C. Rodriguez, Medal of Honor recipient
- Paul Ray Smith, Medal of Honor recipient
- Gabe Vasquez, member of the United States House of Representatives
- Jack Vowell, Republican member of the Texas House of Representatives from 1981 to 1995; construction company president in El Paso
- Richard C. White, member of the United States House of Representatives, WWII veteran, Marine
- Myra Carroll Winkler (1880-1963), first woman to hold elected office in El Paso County.

== Western history ==
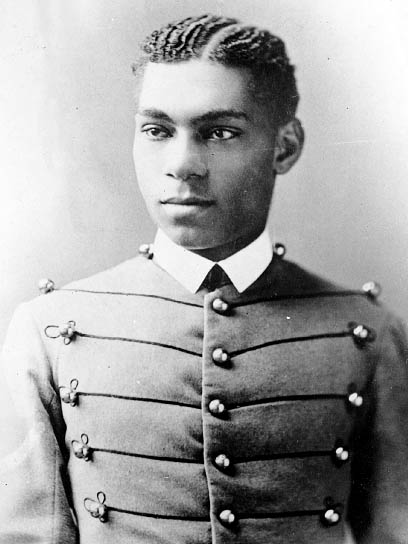
Henry O. Flipper, a Buffalo Soldier, lived in El Paso.

- George Campbell, ex-El Paso marshal
- Albert Jennings Fountain, Wild West Indian fighter, politician
- Henry O. Flipper (1856-1940), Buffalo soldier and first African American graduate of West Point.
- Pat Garrett, Western law man known for killing Billy The Kid
- John Wesley Hardin, outlaw, attorney and gunfighter in late 19th-century Texas
- Gus Krempkau, El Paso County constable
- Pascual Orozco, Mexican revolutionary leader
- George Scarborough, U.S. Marshal, gunfighter, outlaw
- John Selman, El Paso County constable, cattle rustler and outlaw
- Dallas Stoudenmire, El Paso Town Marshal and U.S. Marshal
- Pancho Villa, Revolutionary general of the Mexican Revolution, Centaur of the North (Centaurio del Norte)
- Florida J. Wolfe (1867-1913), socialite, cattle rancher and philanthropist.

== Film ==
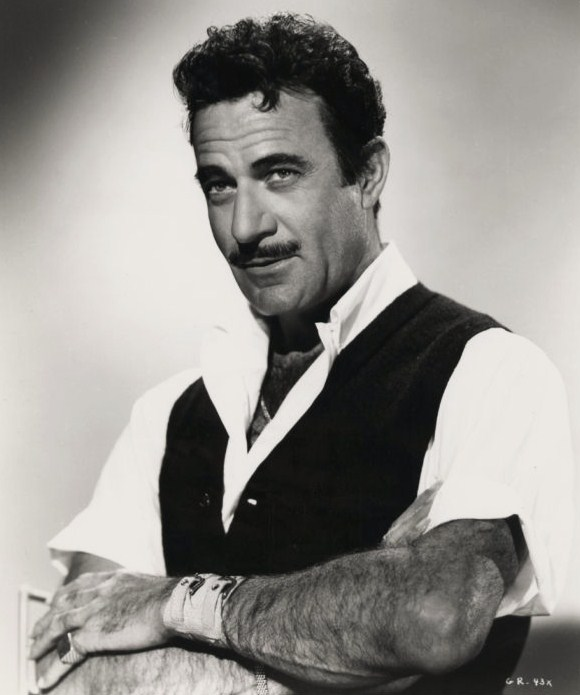
Gilbert Roland in The French Line.

- F. Murray Abraham, Academy Award-winning actor
- Don Bluth, animator and director
- Lombardo Boyar, actor
- Thomas Haden Church, Academy Award-nominated actor
- Norma Crane, film actress known for her role as "Golde" in the 1971 film adaptation of Fiddler on the Roof
- Thomas Rosales Jr., actor, stuntman
- Judith Ivey, Tony Award-winning actress
- Guy Kibbee, actor
- Rudy Larriva, animator and director
- Laura Martinez Herring, Miss Texas USA 1985, Miss USA 1985 and actress, Mulholland Drive
- John Cameron Mitchell, actor, director, songwriter, Hedwig and the Angry Inch
- Lupe Ontiveros, actress
- Anthony Quinn, Academy Award-winning actor
- Debbie Reynolds, Academy Award-nominated actress, Singin' in the Rain
- Lynne Roberts, actress
- Gilbert Roland, Golden Globe-nominated actor
- Arnaldo Santana, actor
- Steven Sills, screenwriter
- Octavio Solis, actor
- Sharon Tate, actress, Valley of the Dolls
- Alan Tudyk, actor
- Hal Warren, writer and director of Manos: The Hands of Fate, widely regarded as one of the worst movies ever made

== Television ==
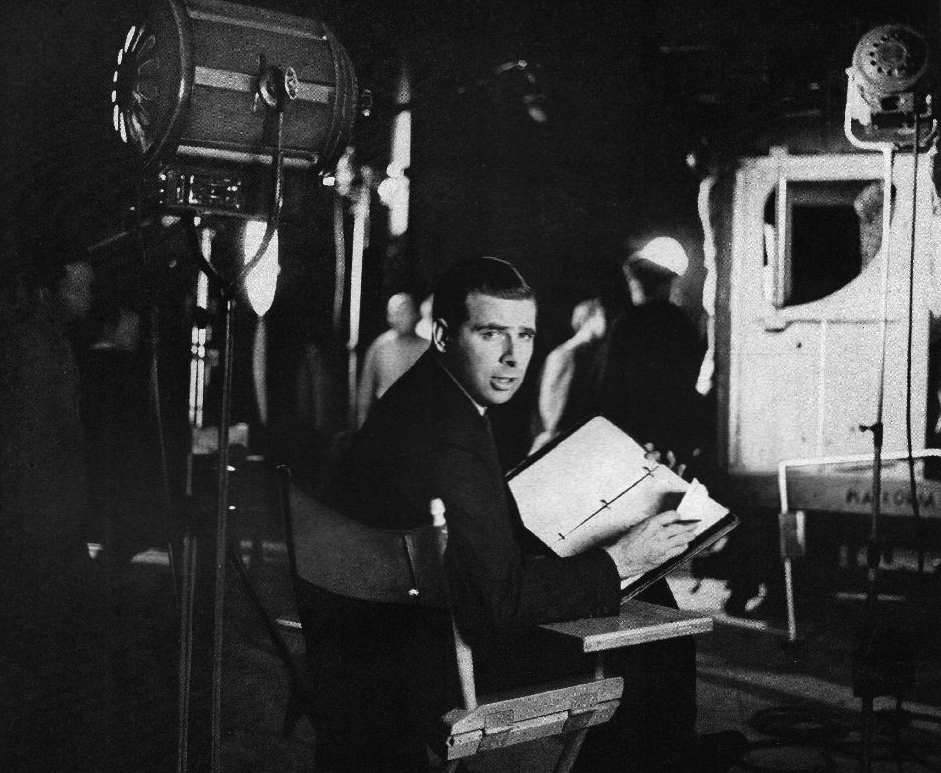
Gene Roddenberry on set.

- Allegra Acosta, Actress
- Ana Alicia, Actress
- Estela Casas (born 1961), News Anchor
- Ara Celi, Actress
- Lydia Cornell, Actress, Model, Comedian, Novelist
- Sam Donaldson, Television Journalist
- Stephen Espinoza, Television Executive
- Alana de la Garza, Actress
- Vickie Guerrero, Actress
- Jack Handey, Comedy Writer and Author
- Sherman Hemsley, Television Actor, The Jeffersons
- Jordan Hinson, Actress
- Elisa Jimenez, Designer
- Bill Macatee, Sportscaster
- Karla Martinez, Television Personality
- Lupe Ontiveros, Actress
- Gene Roddenberry, Star Trek Creator and Television Producer
- Irene Ryan, Actress, The Beverly Hillbillies
- Aarón Sanchez, Chef
- Octavio Solis, Director
- Alan Tudyk, Actor
- Nora Zehetner, Actress

== Literature ==
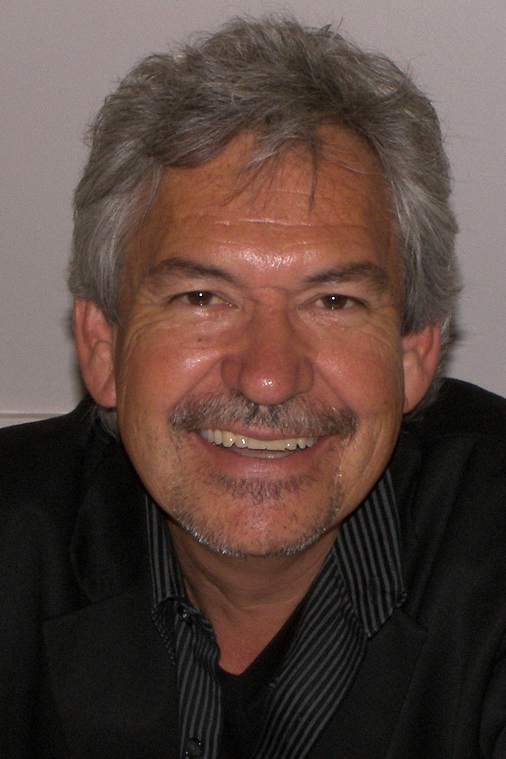
Benjamin Saenz in 2009.

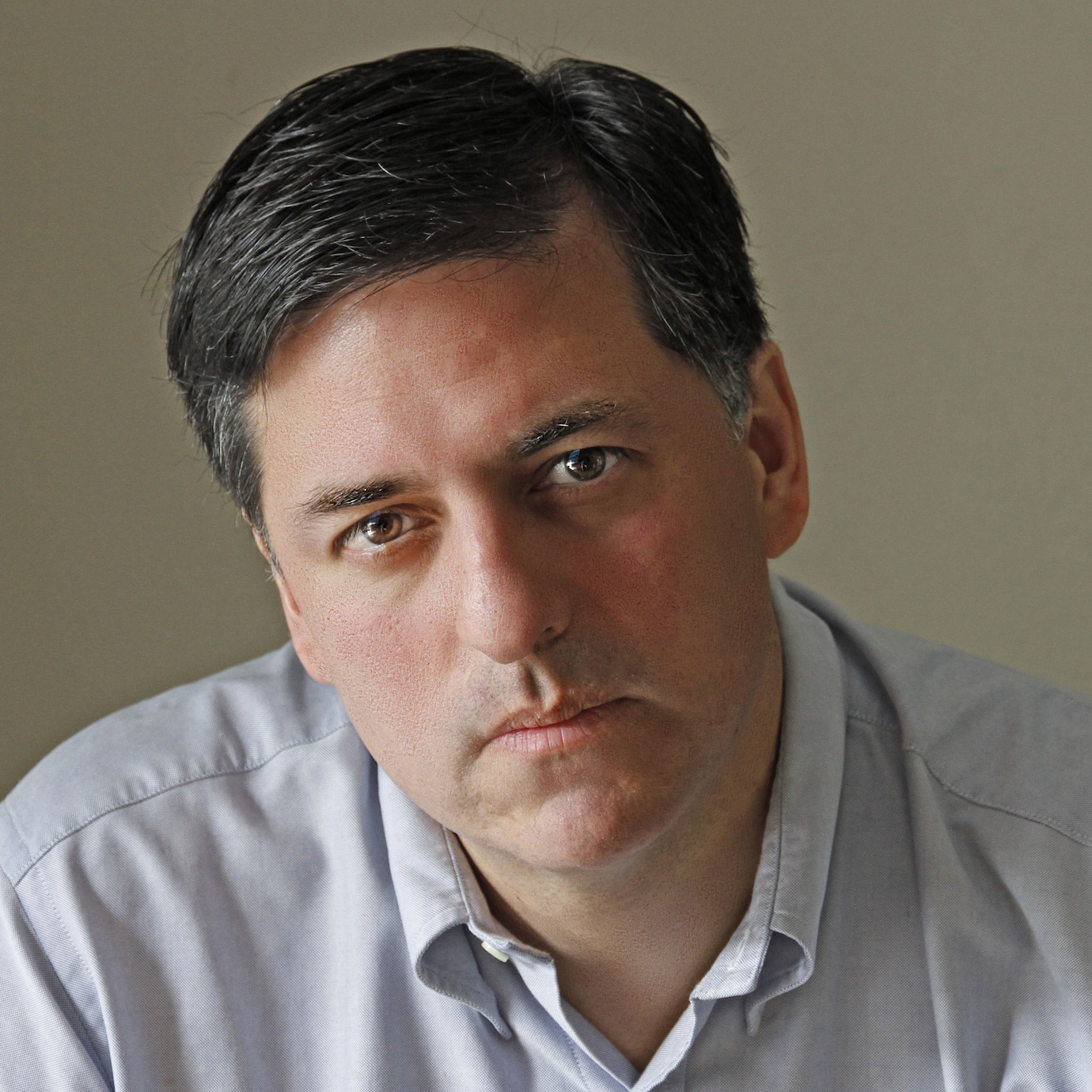
Sergio Troncoso

- Paco Ahlgren, writer
- Alicia Gaspar de Alba, writer, poet, scholar
- Franco Ambriz, playwright
- Kathleen Barber, writer
- Cynthia Farah (born 1949), photographer and writer
- Marcia Hatfield Daudistel, writer.
- Samuel Martínez Roque, also known as To Kill a Man, Mexican writer, singer-songwriter, author of Martínez Roque v. USA
- Shanaya Fastje, author, singer, songwriter, actress and speaker
- Betty J. Ligon (1921-2015), journalist
- Sheryl Luna, poet.
- Cormac McCarthy, novelist
- Aileen Mehle, gossip columnist
- Leon Claire Metz, author, writer, historian, television and radio personality, public speaker and story teller
- Pat Mora, author
- Michael Petry, artist, author
- Estela Portillo-Trambley, poet
- John Rechy, author
- Benjamin Alire Sáenz, writer, poet
- Rubén Salazar, journalist
- Robert Skimin, author
- Sergio Troncoso, author
- Janice Woods Windle (born 1938), novelist
- Angelina Virginia Winkler, journalist, editor, magazine publisher

== Visual arts ==
- Manuel Gregorio Acosta, artist
- Ho Baron, sculptor
- Kate Moore Brown (1871-1945), clubwoman and creator of the International Museum of Art in El Paso.
- Mago Orona Gándara (1929-2018), Chicana artist and muralist
- Joe Allen Hong, fashion designer, artist
- Anna Jaquez (born 1953), artist and metalsmith
- Luis Jiménez, fiberglass artist
- Tom Lea, artist, war correspondent, novelist, historian
- Tom Moore, cartoonist, Archie comics
- Gloria Osuna Perez (1947-1999), Chicana artist
- Becky Duval Reese, art curator and former director of the El Paso Museum of Art
- Urbici Soler, artist
- Alberto Valdés, painter

== Music, performing arts and stage ==
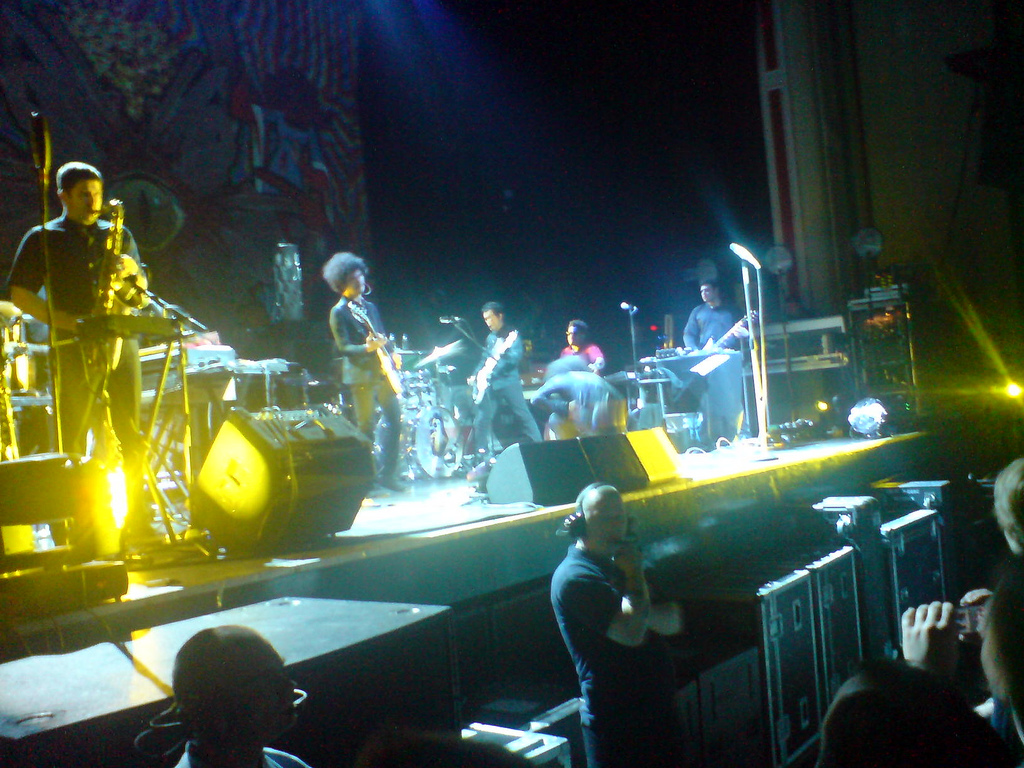
The Mars Volta in concert.

- Birdie Alexander, Musician and Educator
- Blake Allen, Composer and Musician
- At the Drive-In, Alternative Rock Band
- Clint Ballard Jr., Musician
- Cedric Bixler-Zavala, Musician
- Cigarettes After Sex, Indie Band
- Jimmy Carl Black, Musician
- Malena Cano, Ranchero, and Mariachi Singer
- Vikki Carr, Grammy-Winning International Singer, and Entertainer
- The Chamanas, Spanish Rock
- Adam Duritz, Musician
- Emcee N.I.C.E., Hip-Hop
- Bobby Fuller, Musician
- Juan Gabriel, Musician
- Kenneth James Gibson, Musician, and Record Producer
- Late Night Drive Home, Rock Band
- Rosa Ramirez Guerrero, Educator and Dancer
- Gunplay, Rapper
- Ingeborg Heuser, Dancer and Choreographer
- Al Jourgensen, Musician, and Music Producer
- Khalid, Singer, and Songwriter
- Ronn Lucas, Ventriloquist, and Comedian
- Terry Manning, Music Producer, Audio Engineer, and Photographer
- The Mars Volta, Progressive Rock Band
- John Moyer, Musician, Bass Player for Disturbed
- Stevie Nicks, Musician
- Drusilla Nixon, Music Educator, Civil Rights Activist, and Community Advocate
- Salim Nourallah, Musician
- Phil Ochs, Musician
- Pissing Razors, Groove Metal Band
- Jiles Perry Richardson, Musician also known as The Big Bopper
- Joan H. Quarm, American Educator, Actor, and Theater Director
- Riot Ten, DJ, and Producer
- Omar Rodríguez-López, Musician
- The Royalty, Musical Group
- Tom Russell, Singer, and Dongwriter
- Irene Ryan, Actress, and Entertainer
- Freddy Soto, Comedian
- Sparta, Musical Group
- Ryan Stout, Comedian
- Don Tosti, Mexican American Composer, Bandleader, and Musician
- Jim Ward, Musician
- Todd Womack, Comedian

== Sports ==
- Diego Abarca (born 2005), soccer player
- Keitha Adams (born 1967), basketball coach
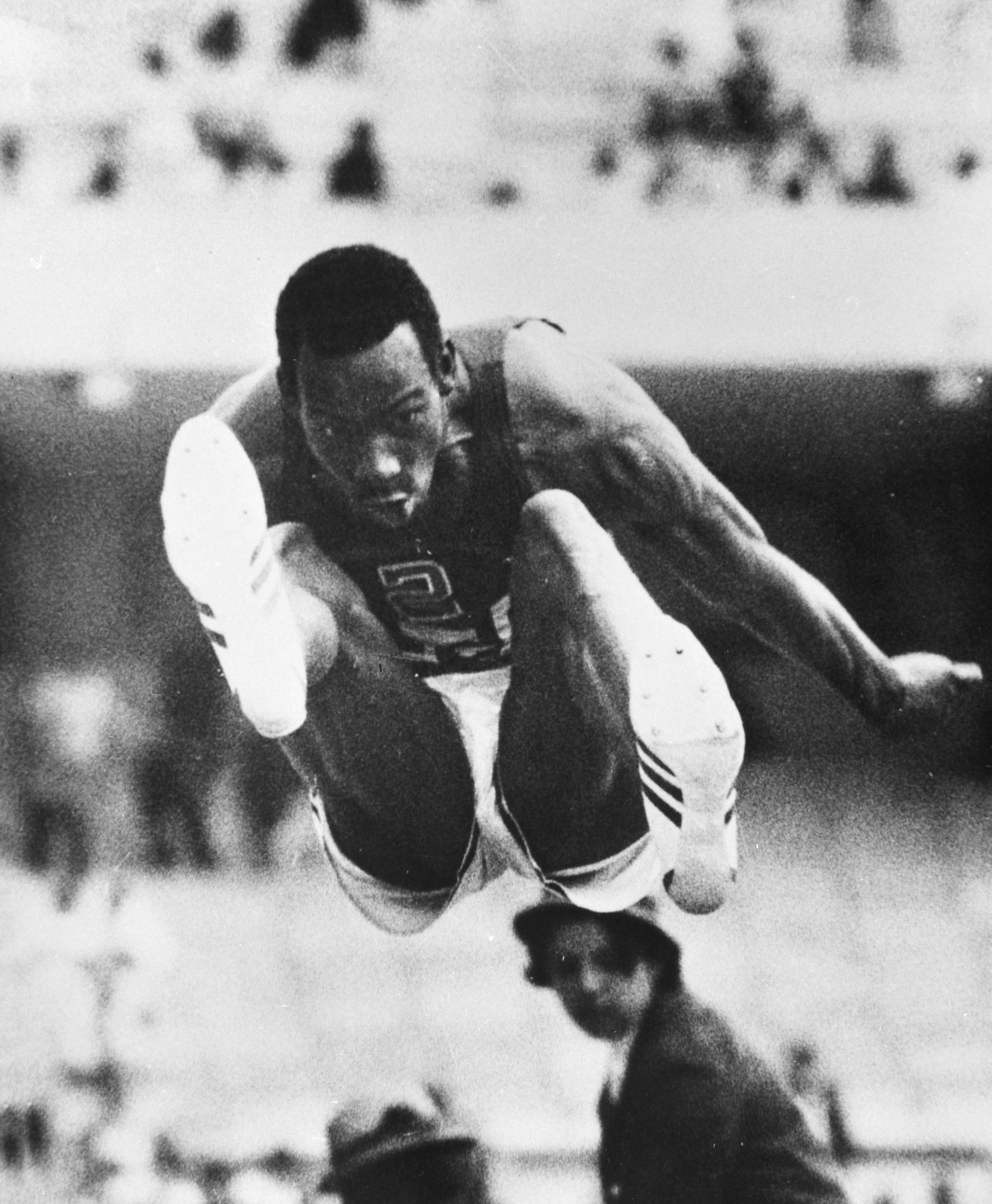
  Bob Beamon in 1968.
- Kristi Albers (born 1963), professional golfer
- Mikey Ambrose (born 1993), soccer player
- Nate Archibald, basketball player
- Arturo Astorga (born 1998), soccer player
- Jerry D. Bailey, jockey
- Cesar Bazan, boxer
- Bob Beamon, Olympic champion long jumper
- Rich Beem, professional golfer
- Cinta De Oro, Wrestler
- Fred Carr, NFL player, Green Bay Packers Hall of Fame inductee
- Frank Castillo, baseball player
- Caesar Cervin (born 1967), soccer player and coach
- Andy Cohen, Major League Baseball second baseman and coach
- Randall "Tex" Cobb, boxer
- Jeremiah Cooper, football player
- Alan Culpepper, Olympic runner
- Christian Cunningham (born 1997), basketball player in the Israeli Basketball Premier League
- Mark Dantonio, college football coach
- Billy Davis, NFL player, two-time Super Bowl champion
- Jamie Dick, NASCAR driver
- Manny Fernandez, wrestler
- Tim Floyd, basketball coach
- James Forbes, basketball player
- Greg Foster, basketball player
- Mark Grudzielanek, baseball player
- Chavo Guerrero Sr., professional wrestler
- Chavo Guerrero Jr., professional wrestler
- Eddie Guerrero, professional wrestler former WWE Champion
- Shaul Guerrero, Wrestler
- Vickie Guerrero, Former professional wrestling personality for WWE
- Don Haskins, basketball coach, Naismith Basketball Hall of Fame inductee
- J. P. Hayes, professional golfer
- Tuff Hedeman, rodeo performer
- Butch Henry, baseball pitcher and Minor League manager
- Bruce Holmes, football player
- Mary Cunningham Hoover (1928 - 2020), tennis and golf.
- Chris Jacke, NFL player, Green Bay Packers Hall of Fame inductee
- Marcell Jacobs, Olympic sprinter
- Aaron Jones, NFL player
- Shawn Jordan, LSU Football Champion, UFC Fighter
- Seth Joyner, professional football player
- Juan Lazcano, boxer
- Nik Lentz, mixed martial artist
- Marshall Leonard, professional soccer player
- Will Licon, swimmer
- Jair Marrufo, soccer referee
- Don Maynard, professional football player
- Taj McWilliams-Franklin, professional basketball player
- Ray Mickens, professional football player
- Santiago Muñoz, soccer player
- Ricardo Pepi, soccer player
- Danny Perez, professional baseball player
- Mike Price, college football coach
- Omar Quintanilla, professional baseball player
- Nolan Richardson, basketball coach
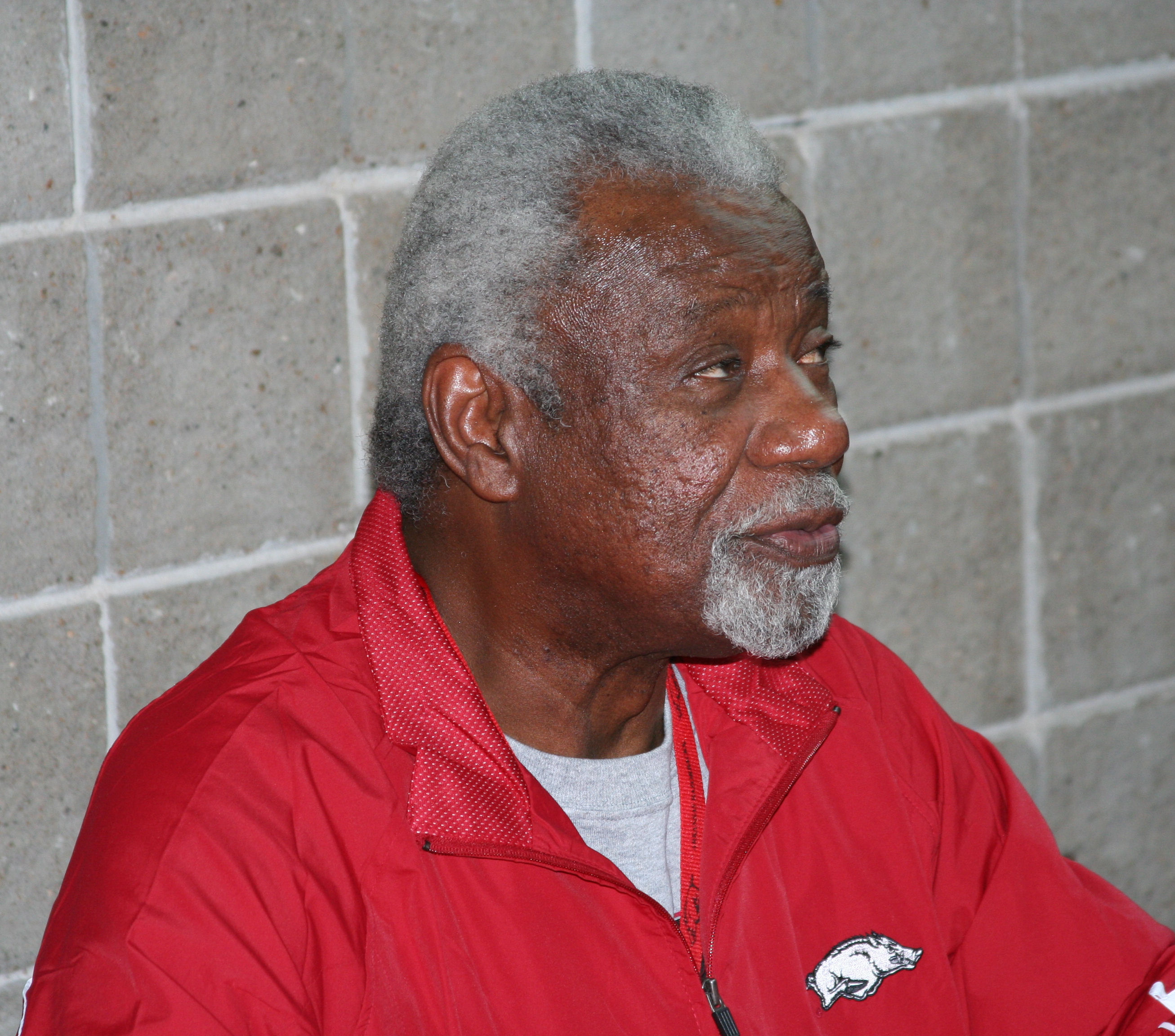
  Nolan Richardson in 2009.
- David Rodriguez professional boxer
- Sandra Rushing, basketball coach
- Omar Salgado, professional soccer player
- Dick Savitt, professional tennis player
- Willie Shoemaker, jockey
- John Skelton, NFL quarterback
- Paul Smith, football player
- Paul Stankowski, professional golfer
- Ed Stansbury, NFL player
- Reece "Goose" Tatum, professional basketball player
- Kenny Thomas, professional basketball player
- Tony Tolbert, professional American footballer
- Lee Trevino, professional golfer
- Austin Trout, professional boxer
- Jesse Whittenton, NFL player, Green Bay Packers Hall of Fame inductee
- Brian Young, football player
- Jake Young, football player
- Alejandro Zendejas, soccer player
- Alan Zinter, baseball player and coach
- Magno, professional wrestler
- Darell Hernáiz, MLB Player

== Educators and librarians ==
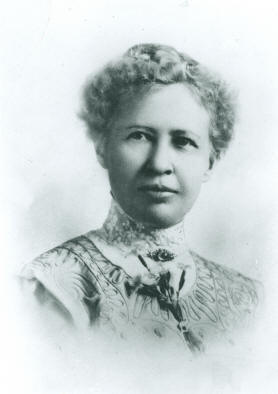
- Mary Irene Stanton.
  Blanca Enriquez, educator and director of Head Start
- Betty Mary Goetting (1897-1980), librarian and activist
- Olga Bernstein Kohlberg (1864-1935), philanthropist and founder of first public kindergarten in Texas
- Dionne Mack (born 1973), librarian and deputy city manager
- Francis Joseph Mullin, president of Shimer College
- Diana Natalicio (born 1939), first woman to serve as president of UTEP
- Mary Irene Stanton (1862-1946), founder of the El Paso Public Library
- Maud Durlin Sullivan (1870-1943), librarian at the El Paso Public Library
- Josefina Villamil Tinajero, bilingual educator
- María Guillermina Valdes Villalva (1939-1991), scholar and educator
- Kimie Yanagawa (1915-1997), educator and first Japanese person naturalized in the United States

== Video games ==
- Don Bluth, animator and director; co-creator of Dragon's Lair
- Rawson Stovall, video game producer/designer, author, and first nationally syndicated reviewer of video games

== Others ==
- John Agrue, (1947-2009), Serial killer
- Jay J. Armes, private investigator
- Josephine Clardy Fox (1881-1971), businesswoman and philanthropist.
- Christine Gonzalez, train engineer
- Fred Imus, radio personality, brother of Don Imus
- Peter E. Kern (1860-1937), real estate entrepreneur
- Ruth Kern (1914-2002), lawyer
- Ginger Kerrick, physicist
- Richard Ramirez, serial killer
- George Angel Rivas Jr., criminal, leader of the Texas Seven
- Aaron Sanchez, chef
- Eugenia Schuster (1865-1946), community activist
- Fannie S. Spitz, inventor
- Ron Stallworth, police officer, subject of movie BlacKkKlansman
- Leona Ford Washington (1928-2007), community activist and writer of the song, "The City of El Paso," El Paso's official song
- Wulf Zendik, author, environmentalist, founder of Zendik Farm commune and art cooperative.
