= El Paso Women's Hall of Fame =

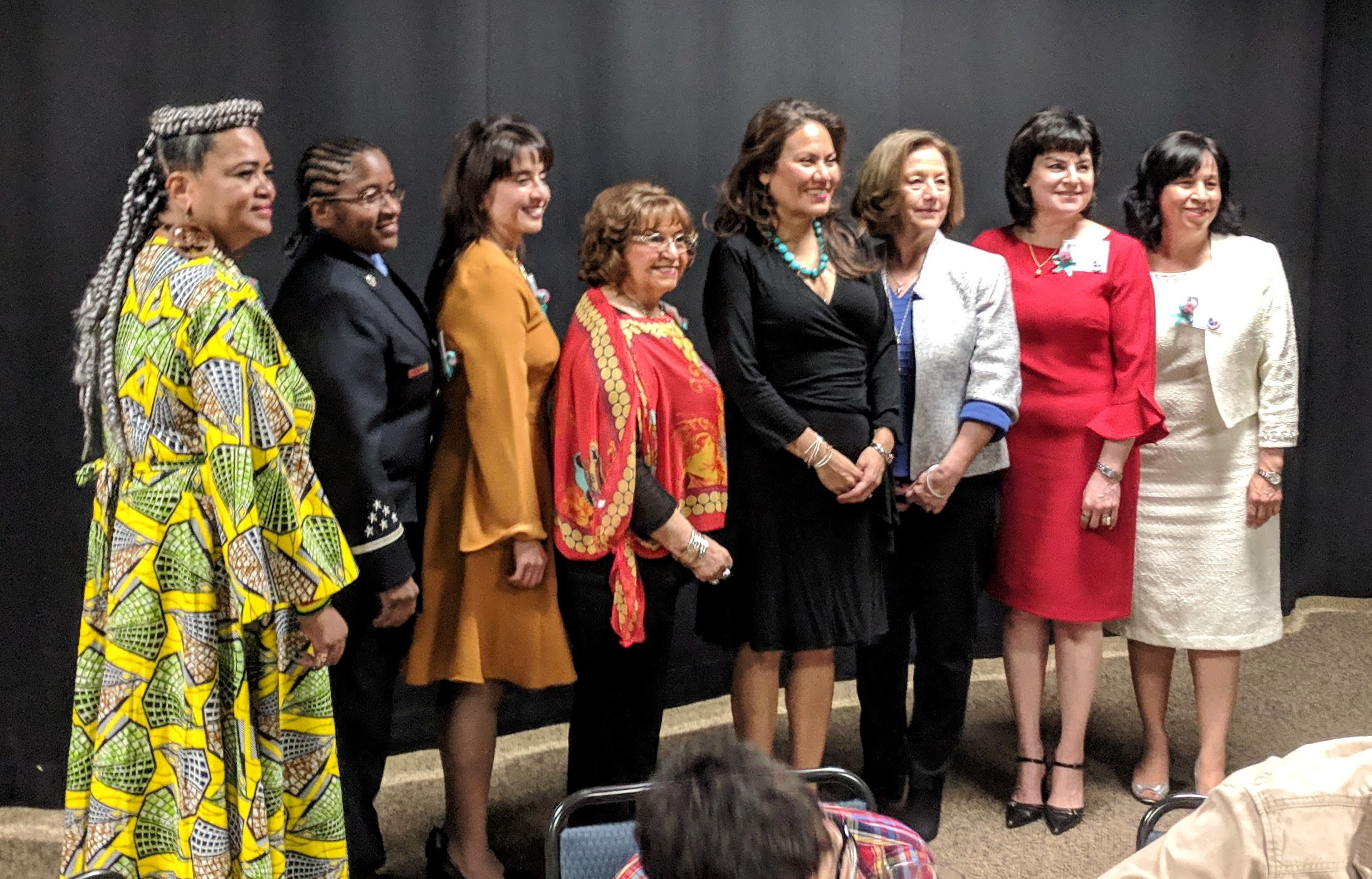
2019 El Paso Women's Hall of Fame Inductees

The El Paso Women's Hall of Fame honors and recognizes the accomplishments of El Paso women. It is sponsored by the El Paso Commission for Women and was established in 1985. The first inductees were honored in 1990.

Inductees are women who live in El Paso and who have made a significant contribution and impact on the community. The Commission accepts nominations from the public. There are four honorary members, including Herlinda Chew, Polly Harris, Drusilla Nixon and Hedwig Schwartz. Streets in El Paso have been named after hall of fame inductees.

== Inductees ==
El Paso Women's Hall of Fame
Name	Image	Birth–Death	Year	Area of achievement
Christina Acosta			2015	Civic leadership.
Lucy G. Acosta		(1926–2008)	1990	Civic leadership.
Keitha Adams		(1967–)	2010	Sports and athletics.
Clara Duncan Adams			2012	Civic leadership.
Sylvia Aguilar			2002	Public service.
Magdalena Morales- Aina			2016	Public service.
Kristi Albers		(1963–)	2011	
Armida Alvarez			2017	Business.
Claudia Andrade			2009	Professional.
Shelia Anthony			2026	Military.
Aliana Apodaca			2026	Business.
Suzie Azar		(1946–)	2005	Public service.
Rita E. Baca			2016	Sports, athletics.
Kathleen Barber			1993	Professional.
Janet Bartlett			2002	Science, health care.
Margaret R. Bartoletti			2006	Science, health care.
Jimmy Fay Beall			1995	Education.
Yvonne Bela			1993	
Margaret Belding de Wetter		(1923–2018)	2002	Arts.
Cleola L. Berry		(1920--2021)	1996	Civic leadership.
Nancy Booth			2015	Professional.
Campbell Bowden			2024	Sports/athletics.
Dana Boyd			2017	
R. Katherine Brennand			1997	Civic leadership.
Heidi V. Brown		(1959–)	2013	
Florence Buchmueller		(1940–)	2008	Volunteerism.
Iris Burnham		(1942–)	1993	Education.
Sharon Butterworth			2007	Public service.
Dorothy "Sissy" Byrd			2019	Community activist.
Malena Cano			2017	Arts.
Kathleen Cardone		(1953–)	2004	Public service.
Luz M. Carpio			1994	Civic leadership.
Mary Lou Carillo				
Yvonne Carillo				
Patricia Carter			2019	Science, health care.
Estela Casas		(1961–)	2011	
Patricia Castiglia			1997	Science, health care.
Rosemary Castillo			2001	Science, health care.
Alicia R. Chacón		(1938–2025)	2011	
Corinne Chacón			2017	Civic leadership.
Irene Chavez			2010	Science, health care.
Herlinda Wong Chew		1894–1939	1992	
Barbara Forester Coleman			1999	Public service.
Lurline Coltharp		(1913–1998)	1992	Education.
Vivienne Corn			1995	Civic leadership.
Marilyn Cromeans			2011	
Lillian Williams Crouch			2005	Education.
Iola Crumady		(1924–2011)	1993	
Beatriz Reyna Curry			1995	Education.
Marcia Hatfield Daudistel			2013	
Barbara Jean Daughtry		(1944–1997)	1998	Professional.
Stacy Davis			1993	
Myrna Deckert		(1936–2020)	1990	Professional.
Martini DeGroat			2000	
Alzina Orndorff DeGroff		(1858–1926)	2010	
Kim Diaz			2024	Education.
Barbara Diaz-Walker			2008	Professional.
Betty J. Dodson			1998	Education.
Mary Ann Dodson			1998	Civic leadership.
Stephanie Karr Dodson			1998	Science, health care.
Alejandrina Drew			2004	Arts.
Rufina Eva Ducre		(1932–1997)	1997	Volunteerism.
Eleanor Duke			1996	Education.
Amanda Ekery			2026	Arts.
Ann M. Enriquez			2003	Civic leadership.
Blanca Enriquez			1999	Education.
Gloria Estrada			2018	Sports, athletics.
Irma Estrada			2013	
Veronica Escobar		(1969–)	2019	Public service.
Cynthia Farah		(1949–)	1992	Arts.
Joyce Edwards Feinberg			1999	Professional.
Enriqueta Fierro				
Diane Flanagan			2013	Civic leadership.
Maria Elena Flood			2004	Science, health care.
Christina Ford			2018	Professional.
Jeanne Foskett			2009	Education.
Ginger G. Francis			2010	
Gabriela A. Gallegos			2017	Sports, athletics.
Anna Gill			1994	Professional.
Mimi Reisel Gladstein		(1936–)	2011	
Beatrice Gladstone			2003	Civic leadership.
Delia Gomez			1996	Humanitarian.
Manuela Gomez			2024	Public service.
Mónica Gómez			1995	Professional.
Mary González		(1983–)	2015	Public service.
Mary Carmen Gonzalez			2009	Science, health care.
Sandra Gonzalez			2018	Science, health care.
Susie Gorman			2012	Volunteerism.
Rosa Ramirez Guerrero		(1934–)	1991	Arts.
Maria de Jesus Guevara			2007	Public service.
Nancy Hamilton			2008	Arts.
Anna M. Harris-Howell			2016	Military.
Juliet M. Hart			2017	Volunteerism.
Romy Saenz Hawkins			2019	Arts
Mary R. Haynes			2008	Public service.
Elvia Hernandez			2001	Civic leadership.
Marta Duron Hernandez		(1935–2022)	1990	Public service.
Jan Herring		(1923–2000)	1990	Arts.
Ingeborg Heuser		(1928–2022)	2009	Arts.
Frances G. Hills			2006	Civic leadership.
Iliana Holguin			2016	Professional.
Betty Hoover			1996	Health care.
Felicia P. Hopkins			2005	Professional.
Cynthia D. Horton			2015	
Sally Hurt-Steffen			2011	
Andrea Gates Ingle			2016	Arts.
Patricia Islas			2012	Education.
Hope M. Jackson			2017	
Davie Johnson		(1929–)	1993	Science, health care.
Louise E. Johnson			1998	Professional.
Julia E. Kallman			2019	Sports and athletics.
Betsy Keller			2026	Public service.
Elizabeth H. Kelly			1992	Professional.
Catherine Kennedy			2019	Education.
Ruth Kern		(1914–2002)	1993	Civic leadership.
Ginger Kerrick		(1970–)	2017	Science, health care.
Diana M. Kirk			2006	Public service.
Catherine B. Kistenmacher		(1927–2008)	2007	Arts.
Mary A. Lacy			1997	Education.
Grace Lake			1996	Civic leadership.
Karen Larose			2018	Public service.
Linda B. Lawson				
Sarah Dighton Lea		(1912–2008)	2002	Civic leadership.
Romy Ledesma		(1935–)	1992	Science, health care.
Betty J. Ligon		(1921–2015)	1999	Arts
Lily Limon	Lily Limon March 2026		2026	Civic leadership.
Maureen Lofberg			2015	Science, health care.
Lupe Casillas Lowenberg			1995	Arts.
Betty Lee Moor MacGuire			2007	Civic leadership.
Patricia A. Macias			2003	Public service.
Transito Alarcon Macias			2006	Education.
Mary Mack			2015	Sports and athletics.
Olga M. Mapula		(1938–)	1993	Public service.
Adair Wakefield Margo		(1954–)	1998	Arts.
Harriet May			2002	Professional.
Ann M. Rodriguez-McConnell			2016	Science, health care.
Mary Jo Ponsford Melby			2013	
Jean H. Miculka			2008	
Paula Rae Mitchell			1999	Education.
Buena T. Milson			1995	Science, health care.
Marina Monsisvais			2018	Social media, public relations.
Irma Montoya			2010	
Maggie Morales Moody			2024	Community activist.
Esperanza Acosta Moreno			2001	Science, health care.
Eva Moya			2019	Civic leadership.
Marilyn Mundun			2011	
Phoebe H. Mutnick		(1914–1993)	1994	Arts.
Surella C. Nasser			2010	
Diana Natalicio		(1939–2021)	1990	Education.
Maria Almeida Natividad		(1947–)	2015	Arts.
Jean Offutt			2001	Professional.
Triana Olivas			2011	
Gloria Osuna Perez		(1947–1999)	2001	Arts.
Leticia Paez			1997	Science, health care.
Carolyn P. Parker			1997	Business.
Divenus E. Parker			2019	Volunteerism.
Elsie Partridge			2008	Sports and athletics.
Anna Valdez Perez			2015	Education.
Margaret L. Perez			2017	Public service.
Nita B. Phillips			2009	Volunteerism.
Irene Pistella			2019	Business
Mary Ponce		(1914–2009)	2008	Civic leadership.
Evelyn Posey			2001	Education.
Len Golden Price			2003	Professional.
Candace Printz			2026	Community activist.
Joan H. Quarm		(1920–2010)	2003	Arts.
Patricia D. Quinn			2005	Civic leadership.
Adeeba A. Raheem			2024	Professional.
Carolyne Redic			2016	Education.
Becky Duval Reese			2005	Arts.
Barbara M. Reeves			2013	
Sandra M. Reid			2026	Volunteerism.
Marty Reyes			2018	Education.
Patricia Reyes			2007	Professional.
Cynthia D. Rivera			1999	Science, health care.
Guadalupe Rivera		(1924–2023)	1991	Public service.
Jetta E. Roberts		(1930–2022)	2024	Volunteer.
Bettie A. Robinson		(1936–2017)	2024	Community activist.
Belen B. Robles		(1936–)	2004	Civic leadership.
Carmen E. Rodriguez			2009	Civic leadership.
Jody Rogers			2011	
Peggy Rosson		(1935–)	1992	Public service.
Sandra Rushing			1999	Sports and athletics.
Mary Lorraine Russell			1996	Humanitarian.
Josefina A. Salas-Porras		(1926–2002)	2003	Education.
Margarita Sanchez			2013	
Helen Santamaria			2016	Civic leadership.
Rosa V. Santana			2004	Professional.
Rita Sarinana		(1935–2014)	1995	Civic leadership.
Mary Carmen V. Saucedo			2004	Education.
Sonya A. Saunders			2016	Volunteerism.
Lucy Scarbrough		(1927–2020)	1996	Arts.
Ann Goodman Schaechner				
Kitty Schild		(1948–)	1998	Public service.
Bonny Schulenburg			2017	
Jody Polk Schwartz			2000	Arts.
Tania L. Schwartz			2006	Arts.
Mayola Senior		(1904–1992)	1993	Civic leadership.
Josette Shaughnessy			2018	Business.
Gladys R. Shaw		(1931–2011)	2010	
Sue Shook		(1945–2003)	2003	Education.
Maxine L. Silva		(1915–2013)	1995	Public service.
Selena N. Solis			2019	Professional.
Gemtria St Clair			2010	
Sally A. Hurt Steffen				
Mary B. Stevens			1995	Education.
Josie Tinajero			1994	Education.
Mary Newell Tippin		(1925–2007)	1998	Education.
Patty Tiscareño			2018	Volunteerism.
Rita Triana			2012	Arts.
Diane Troyer			1991	Education.
Monica Tucker			2024	Civil leadership.
Sue Cardwell Turner		(1912–1996)	1997	Volunteerism.
Jennifer L. VandeBosch			2012	Professional, business.
Cora Viescas			1991	Professional.
Robbie F. Villalobos		(1954–2004)	2001	Arts.
Johnnie Washington		(1936–)	1992	Civic leadership.
Leona Ford Washington		(1928–2007)	1991	Civic leadership.
Denese Watkins			2006	Professional.
Taneka L. Wilborn			2024	Business.
Diane Williams			2024	Military.
Eileen Williams			2015	Military.
Isela Castañon Williams			2026	Education.
Buena T. Wilson				
Janice Woods Windle		(1938–)	1996	Professional.
Jan Wolfe			1993	Arts.
Terry W. Wyatt			2013	
Mary A. Yañez			2019	Public relations.
Tracy Yellen			2018	Civic leadership.
Mary S. Young			2007	Education.
