= Estela Portillo-Trambley =

Mexican-American poet and playwright

Estela Portillo-Trambley (January 16, 1926 – December 1, 1998) was a Chicana poet and playwright. She gained recognition through the publishing of her many plays, prose, and poetry depicting the lives and plight of Chicana women in male-dominated societies.

== Biography ==
Portillo-Trambley was born to Mexican immigrant parents on January 16, 1926 in El Paso, Texas. At a young age, she went to live with her grandparents in El Segundo Barrio of El Paso where her passion for literature was fostered. Growing up Estela had one younger sister named Alicia Portillo-Armendariz and two brothers, Frank Portillo and Robert Portillo. In 1947, she was married to Robert Trambley, and together they had six children - five daughters and one son. She earned a B.A. and M.A. in English from the University of Texas at El Paso and had a career as a high school teacher from 1957 to 1964, at the El Paso Technical Institute, before dedicating herself to writing. She is the first Chicana to publish a short story collection and the first to write a musical comedy. She was the resident dramatist at El Paso Community College from 1970–75. While there she produced and directed the college's dramatic productions and served as a drama instructor. She died on December 1, 1999.

== Career and major works ==
While many works of other authors were centered on the experience of Latin men, Portillo-Trambley focused her work on women, claiming their own voice. Her experiences living in Mexico and along the Texas-Mexico border inspired the evident themes in her works. Portillo-Trambley's work tends to focus on her feminist stance, contesting stoicism and submissiveness of women. The historical play Sor Juana reconsiders the double standards that the 17th century nun faced and reimagines her life from a feminist perspective. Additionally, her play The Day of the Swallows can be considered ahead of its time for featuring a lesbian relationship.

=== Poetry ===
- Impressions (haiku poetry), El Espejo Quinto Sol, 1971.
- (Editor) Chicanas en literatura y Arte (title means Chicana Women in Literature and Art), Quinto Sol, 1974.
- Rain of Scorpions and Other Writings (short stories), Tonatiuh International, 1976 ISBN 978-0892290017
- Trini, Bilingual Press, 1986 ISBN 978-1558615021

=== Plays ===
- The Day of the Swallows (also see below), El Espejo Quinto Sol, 1971.
- Morality Play (three-act musical), first produced in El Paso, Tex., at Chamizal National Theatre, 1974.
- (Contributor) We Are Chicano, Washington Square Press, 1974.
- Black Light (three-act), first produced in El Paso at Chamizal National Theatre, 1975.
- El Hombre Cosmico (title means The Cosmic Man), first produced at Chamizal National Theatre, 1975.
- Sun Images (musical), first produced at Chamizal National Theatre, 1976.
- (Contributor) Roberto Garza, editor, Chicano Theatre (includes The Day of the Swallows), Notre Dame University Press, 1976.
- Isabel and the Dancing Bear (three-act), first produced at Chamizal National Theatre, 1977.
- Sor Juana and Other Plays, Bilingual Press, 1983 ISBN 978-0916950330
- Autumn Gold (three-act comedy)
- Broken Moon (three-act play)
- Los amores de Don Estafa (three-act comedy in English).

== Awards and achievements ==
Portillo-Trambley won the 1975 Quinto Sol Award, a literary award presented by Quinto Sol Publications for her short story collection Rain of Scorpions. Such an award was given to Chicano and Chicana authors, promoting their genre of work.

In 1968, Portillo-Trambley became one of the founders of the first Hispanic theater group, Los Pobres, in El Paso, TX. Later in her career, she attained second place in the 1985 New York Shakespeare Festival's Hispanic American playwright's competition for her play Black Light. The playwright was named Author of the Pass by the El Paso Herald Post in 1990, and was inducted into the El Paso Women's Hall of Fame in 1996. In 1995, she held the position of Presidential Chair in Creative Writing at the University of California, Davis.

== Archive ==
Portillo-Trambley's works and biographical materials are currently archived in the Benson Latin American Collection at the University of Texas. The dates of the papers archived range from 1969 to 1978. Included in the archive are samples of plays, prose, poetry, and other reviews, critical essays, and notes about Portillo-Trambley's work, and an interview by Juan Bruce-Novoa.

Plays

- "Day of the Swallows"
- "Blacklight"
- "Sun Image"
- "Sor Juana"

Prose

- Rain of Scorpions
- Woman of the Earth
- After Hierarchy
