= Kistenmacher =

Kistenmacher is a German occupational surname from Kistenmacher, 'box maker, carpenter'.. Notable people with the surname include:

- Catherine B. Kistenmacher (1927–2008), American artist and art advocate
- Enrique Kistenmacher (1923–1990), Argentine decathlete
