= Nicole Boudreau =

Nicole Boudreau may refer to:

- Nicole Boudreau (Quebec administrator) (born 1949), administrator, activist, and politician in Montreal, Quebec, Canada
- Nicole Boudreau (Montreal politician), former politician in Montreal, Quebec, Canada
- Nicole Boudreau, vocalist with The Royalty, an American indie rock band
