= Betty J. Ligon =

American journalist

- Born: Betty Gose; August 27, 1921; Decatur, Texas, U.S.
- Died: May 18, 2015 (aged 93); Pleasant Hill, California, U.S.
- Education: Wayland Baptist Junior College; West Texas State College
- Occupation: Journalist
- Spouse: Andrew Ligon Sr. (m. 1947)

Betty J. Ligon (née Gose, August 27, 1921 – May 18, 2015) was an American journalist. She is best known for being the longtime entertainment editor on the El Paso Herald-Post.

== Biography ==
Ligon was born Betty Gose in Decatur, Texas on August 27, 1921. She attended Wayland Baptist Junior College first. In 1942, she graduated from West Texas State College, majoring in political science. After college, she worked on the newsletter for the Pantex Plant in Amarillo and then went on to become the only woman on the staff of the International News Service in Dallas. Between 1944 and 1947, she worked at the Amarillo Globe News.

Ligon married Andrew Ligon, Sr. in 1947. Also in 1947, Ligon earned her pilot's license. Ligon flew in the last Powder Puff Derby in 1977 as a passenger. She was also a member of the local chapter of the Ninety-Nines.

In 1969, the El Paso Herald-Post hired her and in the next year, she became the entertainment editor. During the late 1980s and early 1990s, she was responsible for covering most of the art community, shows and the social aspects of the art world in El Paso. She worked for the Herald-Post until 1987, when budget cuts forced her to retire, although she continued to free-lance for the paper until it closed in 1997. After leaving the Herald-Post she wrote for El Paso Inc until 2013.

Ligon died in Pleasant Hill, California on May 18, 2015. Ligon was involved in the creation of the El Paso Museum of History, serving on the board in 1971. She was also involved with promoting El Paso as an "arts destination. Ligon is a member of the El Paso Women's Hall of Fame.
