= Iris Burnham =

American educator

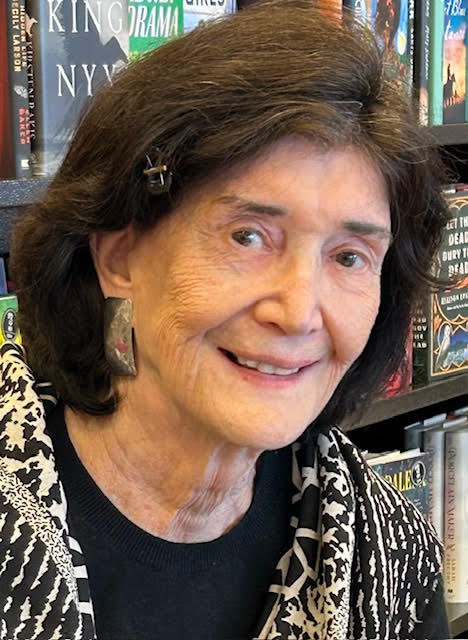
Iris Burnham 2024

Iris B. Burnham is an American educator who headed the organization that opened the first charter school in El Paso, Texas. She also founded the El Paso chapter of National Organization for Women (NOW) and was a co-founder of the first domestic violence shelter for women in El Paso.

In 2023 Burnham published two volumes of her ABC Mystery Series: “Missing Teacher,” and the sequel, “Turkish Tango.”

== Biography ==
In 1977 she became a lecturer in the English department of the University of Texas at El Paso (UTEP).

Burnham, as president and founder of the El Paso chapter of the National Organization for Women (NOW) was part of the founding group of women who in 1977 created the first shelter for women facing domestic abuse in El Paso. Burnham was working as the board president of the Transition Living Center at the time and stated that there was a need in El Paso to provide shelter and resources for women facing domestic violence. She was also involved with supporting the Equal Rights Amendment (ERA).

In 1984, as director of the School for Educational Enrichment (SEE), Burnham received a grant for $200,000 from the Texas Department of Community Affairs to help 163 laid-off workers find new jobs in El Paso. In 1998, SEE opened the first charter school in El Paso, the Burnham Wood Charter School, headed by Burnham. SEE helped students with learning disabilities and behavioral problems. Burnham also worked with at-risk young adults through the Upper Rio Grande Private Industry Council.

In 2015 Burnham retired as superintendent of the charter schools she founded.

Burnham was inducted into the El Paso Women's Hall of Fame in 1993.
