= Ingeborg Heuser =

German dancer (died 2022)

Ingeborg Heuser (April 14, 1928 – February 14, 2022) was a German dancer, choreographer and teacher who worked primarily in the Southwest United States. She is credited with popularizing and promoting ballet in El Paso, Texas.

== Biography ==
Heuser was born in Berlin and her mother encouraged her love of the arts at a young age. Heuser began training in ballet at the age of seven. She started as an apprentice in the Deutsche Oper Corps de Ballet when she was 12 and made her solo debut at age 15. Heuser moved to the United States in 1949. First she worked in California and later she attended the University of Arizona in Tucson as a "special student." In Tucson, she met her first husband, Joe Weissmiller, who was drafted into the Army not long after their marriage.

Heuser moved to El Paso in 1953. She started teaching at the YWCA and then at Virginia Weaver's dancer studio. In 1955, she opened her own ballet center in El Paso. Her ballet center performed at the Magoffin Auditorium in 1958, where E. A. Thromodsgaard, the chair of the music department at Texas Western College, which later became the University of Texas at El Paso (UTEP), was impressed by her.

Heuser joined UTEP in 1960. The Texas Western Civic Ballet began performing annually in 1960 with Heuser as the leader of the company. The ballet company was formed through a partnership between the city of El Paso and UTEP.

Heuser was appointed to the Dance Advisory Panel of the Texas Commission on the Arts and Humanities in 1974. In 1975, the El Paso Herald-Post wrote that Heuser "has single-handedly made El Paso a ballet-loving town." Heuser was further praised by the El Paso Herald-Post for her choreography of the 1976 El Paso production of The Nutcracker, calling it a "party we cannot resist."

In 2007, Heuser retired from teaching at UTEP. After retirement, Heuser continued to teach at the El Paso Conservatory of Dance. Heuser was inducted into the El Paso Women's Hall of Fame in 2009.

Heuser died in El Paso on February 14, 2022.
