= Joan H. Quarm =

Joan H. Quarm (February 24, 1920 – December 28, 2010) was an American educator, theater director, and actor. She was a major figure in El Paso theater productions from the late 1950s until the 2000s. She was responsible for creating two theater companies in El Paso, including the first bilingual theater company in the city. Quarm also worked as a professor at the University of Texas at El Paso (UTEP) and as a theater critic.

== Biography ==
Quarm was born in Bristol in 1920 and later moved to Glasgow when she was still a child. She began to become interested in the theater at age 4. Quarm attended Reading University and Cambridge University. During World War II, she left England and "began a globetrotting career which eventually brought her to El Paso" in the mid-1950s. She taught school in Suffolk and then moved to Portugal to teach at St. Julian's School. During this time, she was married to G. Harvey Summ, and became a United States citizen, moving to Washington, D.C. She moved to Peru after that, taught at American Council where she met her second husband, Thomas A. A. Quarm. They moved to live in Kitwe and then moved to El Paso, Texas. Her husband was involved as a research metallurgist at Asarco. Quarm and her husband had five children together.

Quarm taught English at the University of Texas at El Paso (UTEP) between 1957 and 1985. During her time as a professor, she took students on tours of Europe for which they also received college credit. Quarm also worked as the drama critic for the El Paso Herald-Post where she wrote for around 20 years. She also hosted an arts show on public radio, KTEP-FM.

Quarm's first acting experience in El Paso was working on a staging of Ladies in Retirement in 1956. She was praised by the El Paso Times for her performance in that play. She co-directed Blithe Spirit with Jim French on Biggs Air Force Base in 1957. In 1958, she was cast as Mme. Alvarez in Gigi, in the College Play Festival at UTEP. In 1959, she directed Remains To Be Seen for the Ft. Bliss Theatre Group. She was cast to play the mother in Five Finger Exercise at the El Paso Playhouse in 1961. She directed and played in The Square Root of Wonderful at The Theatre in 1964. In 1965, she staged a performance of the opera La Vida Breve at UTEP.

In 1966, Quarm began the first bilingual theater company in El Paso, Los Pobres Theater. This group went on to inspire the historical El Paso drama, Viva! El Paso. In late 1969, she created the Gilbert and Sullivan Company of El Paso (G&S El Paso), which is still active as of 2018. Quarm would return from abroad to come back to El Paso to direct shows with the company.

Quarm was named a Centennial Leader in 1993. She was awarded a Conquistador Award in 1999 by the El Paso City Council for her work in the arts. She was inducted into the El Paso Women's Hall of Fame in 2003. Around the late 2000s, she developed congestive heart failure. She died of natural causes on December 28, 2010. Her remains were cremated and buried next to her sister, Cecilia, in Portugal.
