= Jan Herring =

American artist

Jan Herring (1923 – February 28, 2000) was an American artist. Herring was based in Clint, Texas and showed her work around the United States. Herring began showing her work in 1950 and worked as an instructor at the El Paso Museum of Art. She was inducted into the El Paso Women's Hall of Fame in 1990.

== Biography ==
Herring was born in Haver, Montana and grew up in South Dakota. She went to the Northern State Teachers' College in South Dakota. Herring also earned a degree in nursing in Columbus, Ohio, studying at the Grant Hospital. Herring worked as a member of the Army Nurse Corps during World War II. She also met her husband, a tail gunner in a B-25, and Texas A&M class of 1941 graduate, Henry Herring, in Columbus. The couple moved to Clint, Texas around 1947 and started a dairy farm. She and Henry had three children together. Herring also attended the University of Texas at El Paso (UTEP) and also studied with artists, Wiltz Harrison and Frederic Taubes. Herring's son, Bill, also went onto become an artist and her daughter, Helen Green and Herring's husband, Henry, also began to create art.

Herring began exhibiting her work in 1950. Herring was elected into the first group of officers for the Las Artistas Verdes Chapter of the Amateur Artists Association of America in 1953. She was showing her work at the new Rio Valle Woman's Club clubhouse in 1954. In the late 1950s, she was working as a permanent art instructor at the Taubes Art Colony in Ruidoso, which she did for several years. She was an artist-in-residence at the El Paso Museum of Art in 1962.

Herring created an artist center in Clint, called the Jan Herring Design Center in 1965. In 1971, she published a book, The Painter's Composition Handbook, which discussed her painting techniques. According to the Lubbock Avalanche-Journal, her book "gives an organized step-by-step teaching plan that can be applied to any age group or any level of development." Herring was inducted into the El Paso Women's Hall of Fame in 1990.

Herring developed Lou Gehrig's disease, but continued to paint "to the very end," according to her son. She died on February 28, 2000. Herring was buried at the Fort Bliss National Cemetery.

== Work ==
Herring thought of herself as a "modern Flemish painter," using old techniques. Later, she worked with the technique of using pastel underpainting on board. Herring worked in oil paint, water colors, enamels and also did sculpture and fabric arts. Herring was inspired by nature and created more than 12,000 works in different mediums.

Herring earned an American Artist Gold Medal in 1956 and was on the Ford Foundation grant board. Herring held one-artist shows in New York. She also exhibited her work in Santa Fe, in Tulsa and throughout Texas in 1958. Also in 1958, her work was selected as part of the traveling D. D. Feldman Collection, which selected the best art work in Texas annually. In 1960, Herring and artist, Warren Travis, appeared in Art in Motion on KTSM-TV, a program sponsored by the Junior League of El Paso, Texas Western College and the El Paso Museum of Art. In 1962, Herring showed her work at the Burr Gallery in New York. Her art was featured in an article of House Beautiful in February 1964. In 1966, Herring was part of an exhibition at the El Paso Museum of Art called "The Four Women Artists." She held a one-person show at the Roswell Museum in 1969. By the end of her life, she had held more than 103 one-person shows across the country.
