= GECU =

Credit union in the US

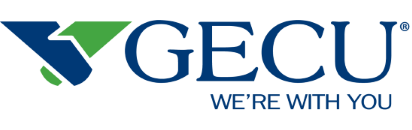

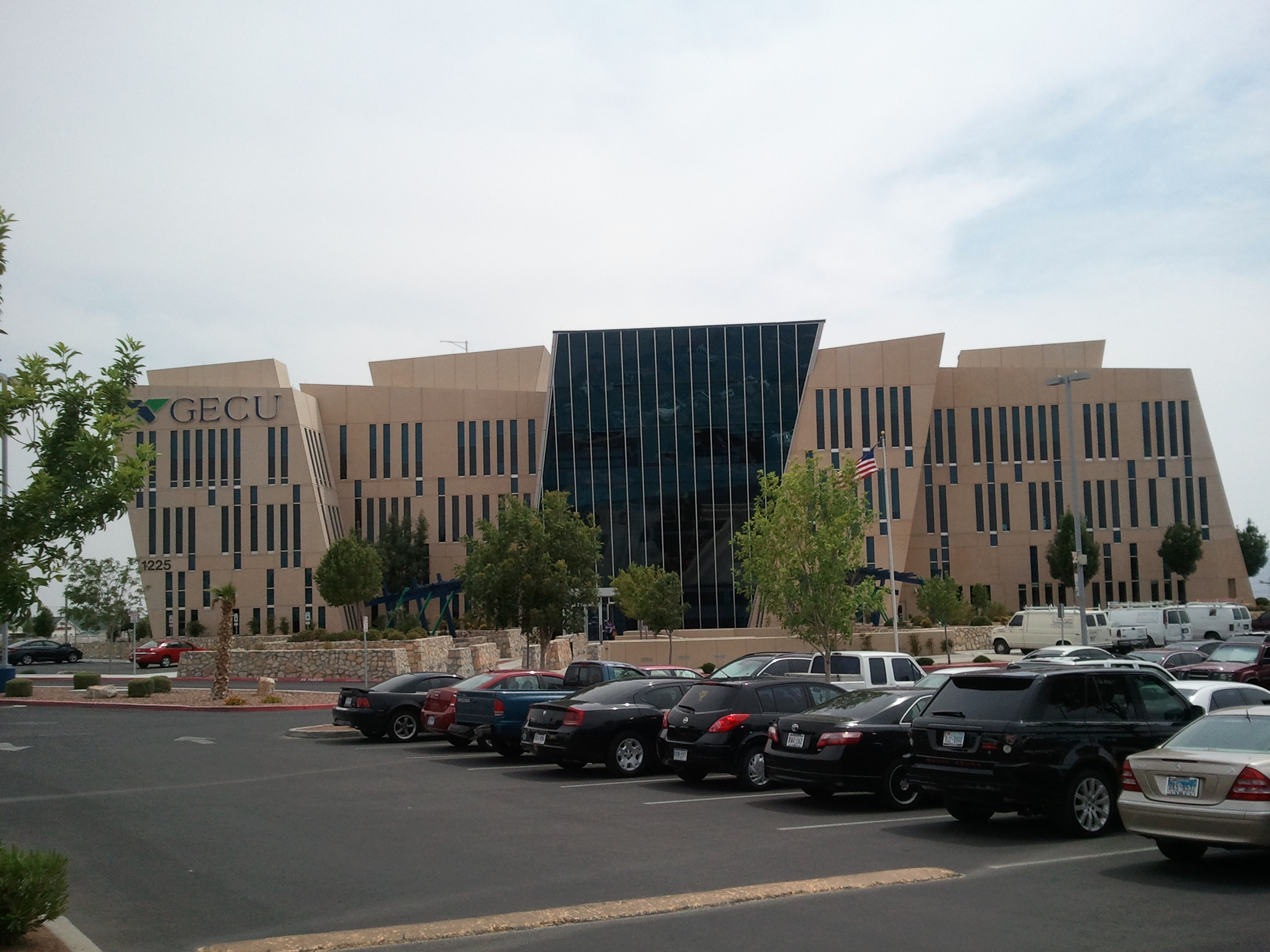
- GECU corporate building
- Type: Credit union
- Industry: Financial services
- Founded: 1932
- Headquarters: El Paso, Texas
- Key people: Alex Rascon, President & CEO
- Products: Savings; checking; consumer loans; mortgages; credit cards, online banking
- Total assets: $4.2 Billion USD (2022)
- Number of employees: 900+
- Website: gecu.com

GECU is a federal chartered credit union headquartered in El Paso, Texas. GECU is regulated under the authority of the National Credit Union Administration (NCUA) and each of their members is an owner who has a vote and a share in the credit union.

== History ==
GECU is the oldest credit union formed in El Paso, Texas. In 1932, eleven El Paso civil servants pooled $5 each to form a credit union inside of the broom closet of El Paso's federal building. In one year, the capital funds of the credit union had increased to $1305. In 1947 there were 135 members which grew to 690 members in 1950. In 1956, a new building was opened to accommodate customer growth, which had increased to 5,500 members. By 2011, there were more than 297,000 members with $1.5 billion in deposits.

T.C. "Ted" Prewitt served as GECU's president starting in 1988. Harriet May, who started working as a teller at GECU in 1974, became the CEO in 1996. Crystal Long took over as CEO in 2011, recommended by May and later elected by the credit union board. Long retired on May 1, 2026, and Alex Rascón, a 28-year GECU employee who had been its chief financial officer, succeeded her as president and CEO. Others involved with GECU included Raymond Telles and Adolfo Loera who served as early directors. Loera served as the first treasurer of GECU.

A GECU branch run by students was opened in Canutillo High School in 2007. A second student-run branch was opened at Del Valle High School in 2008. In 2016, another branch was opened in Coronado High School.

Members of GECU must either reside or work in El Paso County, be related to a current member, or work as a civil service employee in the US. In 2023, GECU was given permission by the National Credit Union Administration to expand services into additional counties in Texas and into New Mexico. GECU opened its first New Mexico branch, in Las Cruces, in March 2025. In November 2025 it announced plans to buy Roswell-based Bank of the Southwest; the National Credit Union Administration, the Federal Deposit Insurance Corporation and New Mexico regulators approved the deal in August 2026, and it took effect on November 1, 2026.
