= Maria Almeida Natividad =

Mexican-American artist

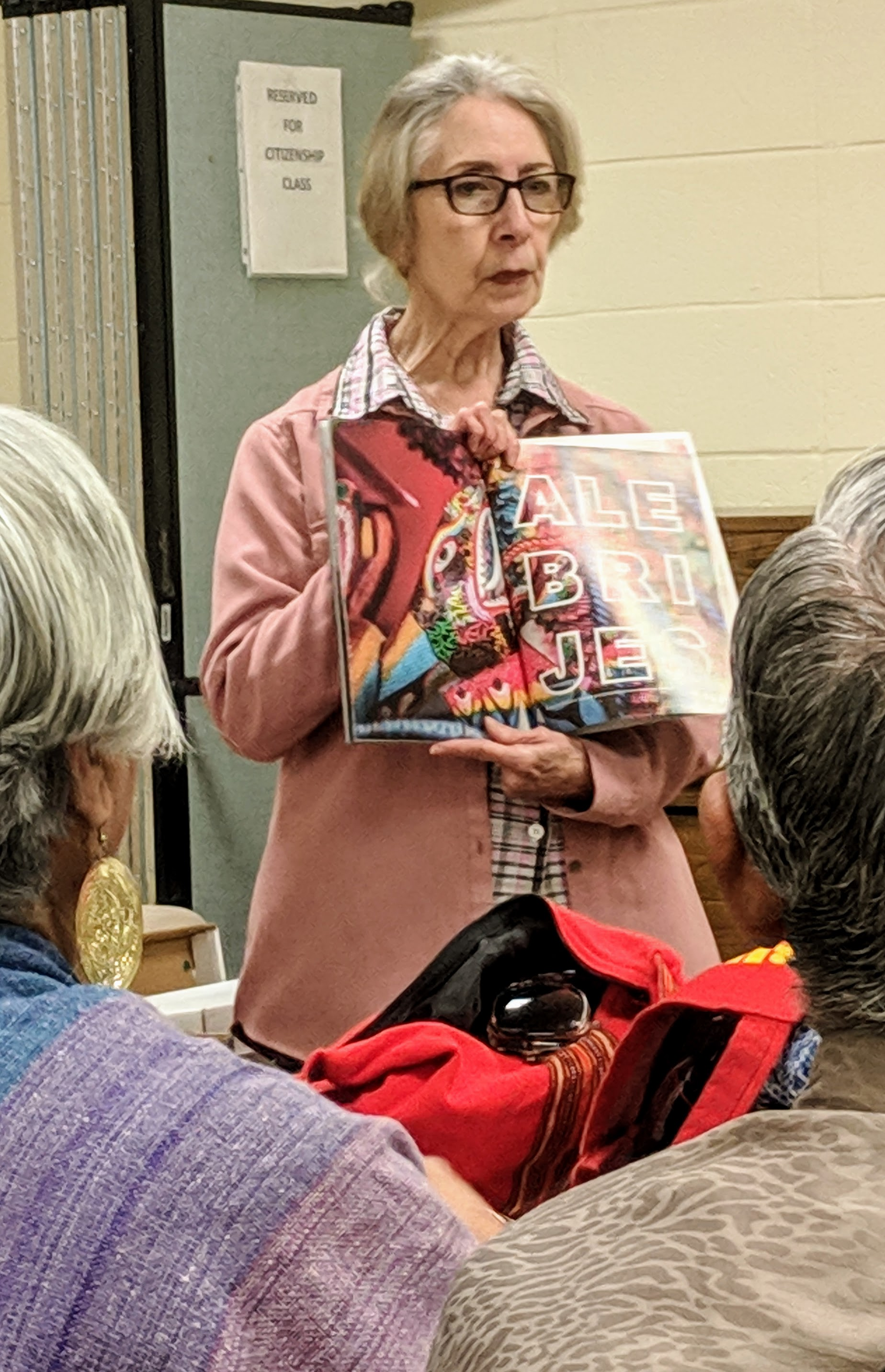
María Almeida Natividad at a gallery event in El Paso (2024)

Maria Almeida Natividad (born December 23, 1947) is a Mexican-American artist and educator whose work has received national and international recognition. She is known for her contributions to Chicana art and her integration of cultural identity, memory, and social themes into contemporary visual forms. Her artwork is held in public and private collections and has been featured in exhibitions, publications, and documentaries.

== Early life and education ==
Maria Guadalupe Almeida was born in El Paso, Texas, in 1947. Her father, Jesus Almeida, was born in El Paso, and her mother, Esperanza López, was born in Ciudad Juárez, Mexico. Raised in El Paso’s Lower Valley, she was influenced by the region’s Hispanic and Native American traditions, which later became central to her artwork.

She studied art at Modesto Junior College, the University of Arizona, and the University of Texas at El Paso (UTEP), where she earned a Bachelor of Arts in 1982 and a Master of Arts in 1995. She later taught art in public schools and community colleges and served as Artist in Residence for the UTEP Chicano Studies Program from 2002 to 2023.

== Career ==
Natividad’s work spans multiple media, including watercolor, acrylic, mixed media, and pen and ink. Her themes often explore identity, faith, cultural heritage, and social commentary. Her artwork has been exhibited in museums and galleries across the Southwestern United States.

Her work is included in the collections of institutions such as the El Paso Museum of Art, Mexic-Arte Museum, San Antonio Museum of Art, McNay Art Museum, and the Hispanic Research Center at Arizona State University.

In 2008, she was commissioned to create a mural for the Judge Edward S. Marquez Branch Library in El Paso. Her painting "Virgen of Guadalupe" was featured in the PBS documentary series Visiones: Latino Art and Culture. Her work has been discussed in books such as Hecho en Tejas and Art of West Texas Women.

== Recognition ==
Natividad was a finalist for Texas State Artist of the Year in 2007 and 2009 and was inducted into the El Paso Women’s Hall of Fame in 2015. Her work has appeared in exhibitions including:

- Los Colores de Mi Cultura: Works by Maria Almeida Natividad, El Paso Mexican American Cultural Center (2025). The exhibition was part of the center’s inaugural programming and received coverage from arts publications including Southwest Contemporary and Glasstire. It showcased works highlighting memory, identity, and regional culture.
- Lovers & Fighters, San Antonio Museum of Art (2024–2025)
- Desert Modern and Beyond, El Paso Museum of Art (2012)
- Arizona International Latina/o Arts Festival, Arizona State University (2005)
- Familia, Fe y Cultura, El Paso Public Library (2007)
- Interviews in Latinopia (2011, 2020)

== Legacy ==
Natividad was former Director of the Juntos Art Association, and in 2015, wrote and illustrated the bilingual children's book Famous Places in El Paso History. The book is part of the El Paso Public Library’s collection.

She has described herself as a "culture bearer" and advocates for art that “crosses borders, speaks many languages, gives light to social issues, and brings peace to a changing world.”
