= Malena Cano =

American singer

- Other name: La Perla
- Occupation: singer
- Known for: her work in both music and stage

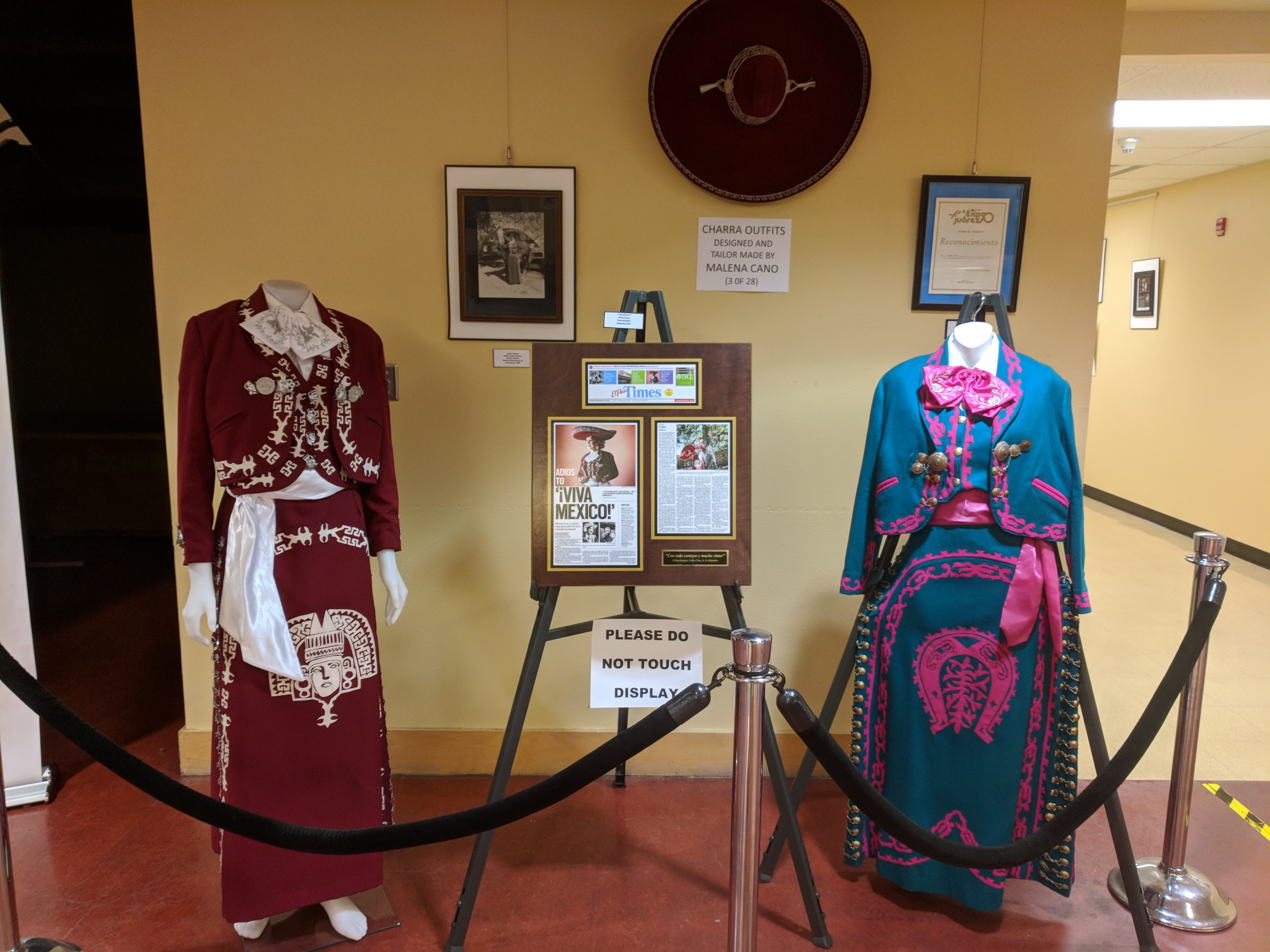
Charra outfits, hat and other items on display belonging to Malena Cano.

Malena Cano (also known as La Perla) is a ranchero music and mariachi singer from the El Paso, Texas area. She is known for her work in both music and stage.

== Biography ==
Cano began performing after winning a singing contest at a local radio station when she was ten years old. Later, at age 16, she would perform at the El Paso Coliseum and other Southwest venues. She sang with a band called The Ruby's and the lead singer of the group, Eugene Anchondo, gave her the nickname, "La Perla." Her work, singing with mariachis was groundbreaking, as women were traditionally excluded from that kind of music. Cano's singing has been popular in the El Paso and Ciudad Juárez areas. Around 1979, she began acting on stage. In addition to stage-work, she also incorporates history from the region into her performances. One of her shows, Viva Mexico, explores Mexican history through song and dance.

In 1990, Cano was nominated in the first Hispanic Music Awards Show. She was awarded "Best Local Female Mariachi Vocalist" in 1993. One of her performance costumes was donated to the Smithsonian and she has been "enshrined" in the National Archives as a Texas folk artist. In 2017, she was inducted into the El Paso Women's Hall of Fame.
