= Marcia Hatfield Daudistel =

American writer

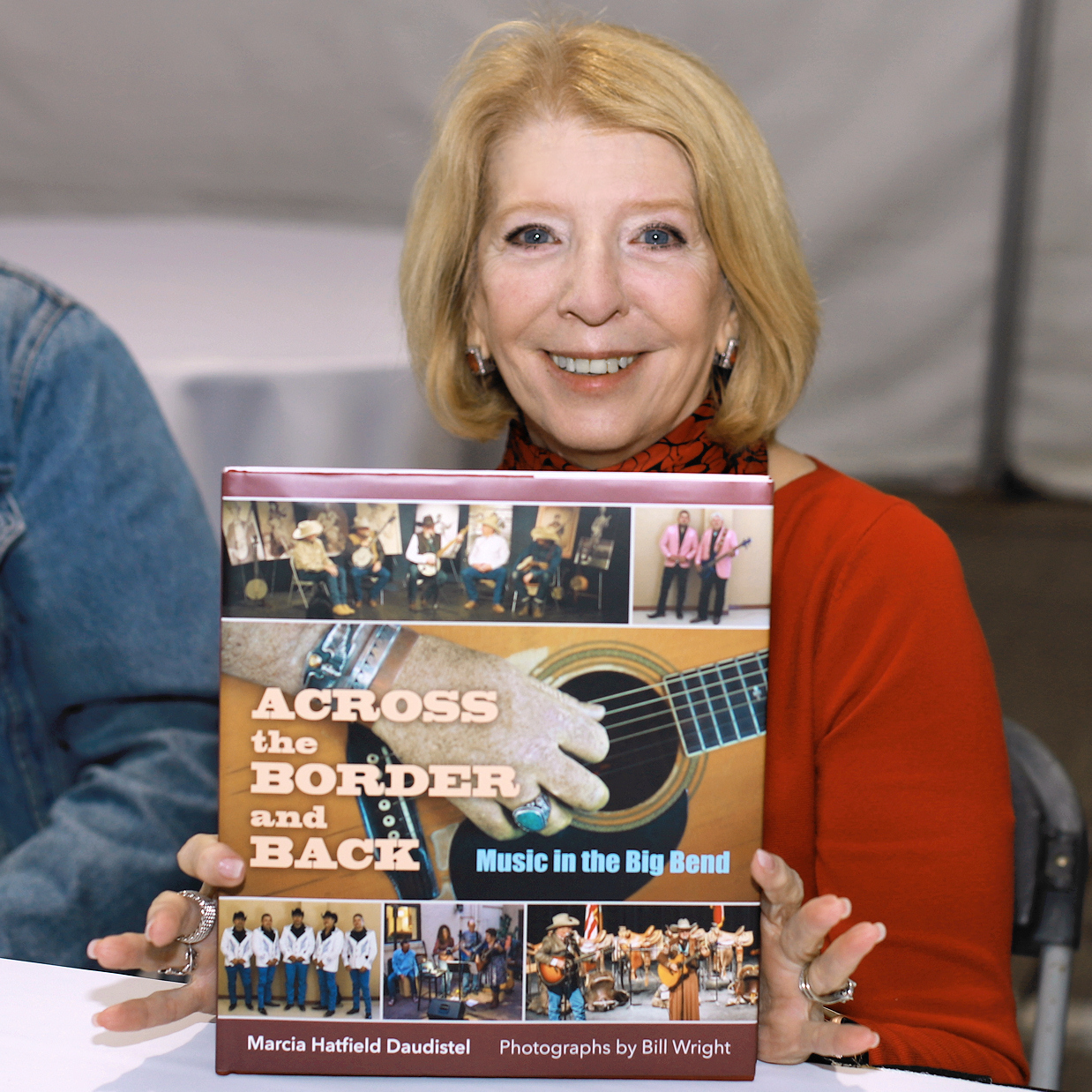
Daudistel at the 2022 Texas Book Festival.

Marcia Hatfield Daudistel is a non-fiction writer and editor who focuses on the history and culture of El Paso, Texas. Daudistel has been inducted into the El Paso Women's Hall of Fame.

Daudistel's anthology, Literary El Paso (2009) is a large collection of essays, stories, poetry and more from 62 different literary figures from El Paso. Each writer represented in the book describes El Paso and their own personal connections to the city. Daudistel said that it was difficult to limit the number of authors for the anthology because El Paso has "an amazing literary heritage."

Grace and Gumption: The Women of El Paso, was also edited by Daudistel and released in 2011. The book describes the profiles of women who have lived in El Paso starting in the 1800s.
