= Becky Duval Reese =

American curator and art museum director

Becky Duval Reese is an American curator and art museum director. She is best known for her work as the director of the El Paso Museum of Art (EPMA) and oversaw the museum's move in 1998. She was inducted into the El Paso Women's Hall of Fame in 2005.

== Biography ==
Duval Reese attended New Mexico State University (NMSU) for both her bachelor and master of arts degrees. She went on to become the director of the Las Cruces Art Learning Center and later, the director of the Williams Gallery at NMSU. After NMSU, she became the educational curator of the University of Texas Huntington Art Gallery where she stayed for 15 years.

Duval Reese moved to El Paso in 1991 order to become the director of the El Paso Museum of Art (EPMA). In 1998, she oversaw the move of EPMA from its old location to a new building she helped design in downtown El Paso. In honor of Duval Reese's 10 year anniversary as the executive director of the art museum, the Friends of the museum bought "Ellipse" by artist, Jesús Bautista Moroles and unveiled the sculpture in August 2001. Duval Reese retired from EPMA in June 2005. That same year, she was inducted into the El Paso Women's Hall of Fame in the arts category.

== Selected publications ==
- Texas Images & Visions. with William H. Goetzmann. Austin, Texas: Arch M. Huntington Art Gallery. 1983. ISBN 9780292738324.
- Texas 100: Selections From the El Paso Museum of Art. with Ben Fyffe. El Paso, Texas: El Paso Museum of Art. 2006. ISBN 9780978538309.
- Land and Light in the American West. San Antonio, Texas: Trinity University Press. 2007. ISBN 9781595340443.
