= Ruth Kern =

American lawyer

Ruth Ellen Kern (August 14, 1914 – January 26, 2002) was an American lawyer, community leader and feminist. Kern was an early pioneer in law for women in El Paso, Texas. She was also outspoken against myths regarding violence against women, sharing her own experiences with rape with the public. Kern was an active member of the American Civil Liberties Union (ACLU), and a lawsuit she filed for an inmate led to El Paso County constructing a new jail with better conditions for inmates.

== Biography ==
Kern was born in Chicago to Swedish immigrants and grew up poor in the South Side. Kern raised her son Peter and attended college and university classes part-time at the University of Chicago and the Chicago Kent College of Law. At the college of law, she was the only woman in her class and she earned the Kappa Beta Pi Honor Key. She was admitted to the Illinois bar in 1946. She started working first as a legal editor for the Commerce Clearing House Association and was about to go into private practice when her son's health prompted a move to El Paso, Texas in 1947. Kern married for a second time in 1948. She became the secretary to County Judge Victor B. Gilbert until her pregnancy with twins David and Suzan interrupted her career. Kern had to take the job as a secretary because she had trouble getting hired as a lawyer in El Paso. She often remarked that when she applied for a job as a lawyer the law firms looked at her like she was from Mars because they had never seen a woman lawyer before. Kern worked as a housewife and did civic work for the next fifteen years before she decided to go back into law. In 1966, she divorced her second husband. Kern was admitted to the Texas state bar in 1967. She started her own private practice in 1968, since law firms weren't hiring many women in the city. She was the only woman doing full-time private law practice in El Paso at the time. Her practice was known as Kern & Rosen and Kern took care of family law, while her partner, Stanley Rosen worked on business law. Kern also taught classes part-time at the University of Texas at El Paso (UTEP) for three years until her law practice grew too busy.

Kern was a member and served as president of the El Paso chapter of the American Civil Liberties Union (ACLU). She often took on indigent criminal defense cases. In one of those, filed around 1975, she sued El Paso County due to the poor conditions in the jail. This lawsuit led to the construction of a new jail. She also defended conscientious objectors to the Vietnam War. In 1974, the El Paso Women's Political Caucus (EPWPC) endorsed Kern for the position of judge at the Court of Domestic Relations in El Paso, which she lost to Enrique Pena after a "hard fight." Kern was also a very outspoken feminist and brought issues like rape and women's rights to the forefront of public discussion. Kern used her own experiences to dismiss myths about rape. She also served as vice chair of a shelter for women facing domestic violence, the Transitional Living Center, which she co-founded in 1977. Kern also co-founded and served as the first president of the El Paso Women's Bar Association.

In 1993, Kern was inducted into the El Paso Women's Hall of Fame. Her twin children from her second marriage, David Kern and Suzan Kern, are both practicing attorneys who cite their mother's example as the reason they pursued law careers. They are her living legacy. Ruth Kern died in her home from an illness on January 26, 2002.
