= Rosa Ramirez Guerrero =

Mexican-American educator and artist (born 1934)

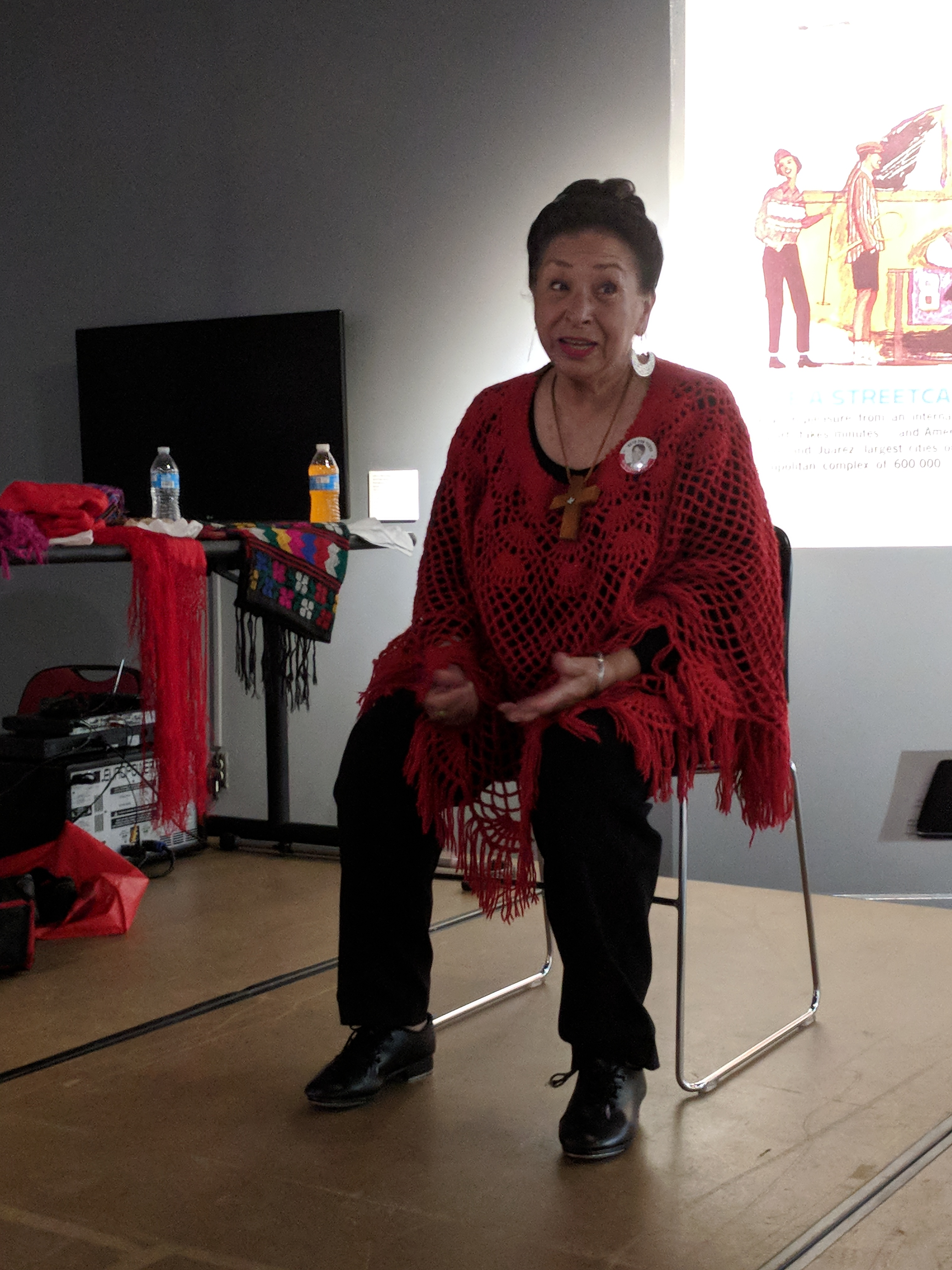
Rosa Guerrero at the El Paso History Museum in June, 2018.

Rosa Ramirez Guerrero (born November 14, 1934) is a Mexican American educator, artist and historian from El Paso, Texas. She was the founder of the International Folklorico Dance Group. Guerrero has also been active with work in the Catholic Church, and has been called the "Dancing Missionary" in religious circles. She is also known for her multicultural dance programs which have been performed around the country and featured in a film called Tapestry. She was inducted into the Texas Women's Hall of Fame and has an El Paso school named after her.

== Biography ==
Guerreo was born and raised in El Paso, Texas. Her parents had migrated from Mexico. Guerrero began learning to dance at five years of age. As a child, she had been punished for speaking Spanish in school. Guerrero's first school was Morehead Elementary School, where she decided she wanted to be an "educator" in third grade. She went to El Paso High School, where she graduated in 1953. She later attended the University of Texas at El Paso (UTEP) on a dance scholarship, graduating in 1957. Guerrero was the first in her family to earn both bachelor's and master's degrees. She majored in elementary and high school education for her bachelor's degree and bilingual education for her master's.

Guerrero received her first job from the El Paso Independent School District (EPISD) with the help of educator, Hibbard Polk, in the early 1950s. She ended up teaching in El Paso schools for around 20 years, doing most of her teaching at Austin High School. Guerrero created the International Folklorico Dance Group, the first ballet folklorico group in El Paso, in 1970. In 1974, she created a film called Tapestry which describes the way she uses folk dances from around the world to celebrate diversity. The film won a Cine Golden Eagle Award in 1974 and was shown at the New York Film Festival. The International Folklorico Dance Group has appeared on Good Morning America and performed at the Kennedy Arts Center.

She has lectured on the history of dance and performed around the country. Between 1989 and 1994, she was also a part-time lecturer for UTEP. Her talks and dance performances are multicultural in nature so that she can reflect the cultural heritage of many different groups of people. She referred to her dance and history program as "Multicultural Tapestry." Her interpretation of the United States is that it is not a "melting pot," but rather a "multicultural tapestry, a mosaic."

She became the first living educator and the first Hispanic woman in El Paso to have a school named after her in 1993. In 1994 she was inducted into the Texas Women's Hall of Fame. Guerrero has also been inducted into the El Paso Women's Hall of Fame. Guerrero has also earned the Ohtli Award from Mexico.

Guerrero retired in 2015.
