= Janice Woods Windle =

American novelist (born 1938)

- Born: Janice Woods Windle; 1938 (age 87–88); Seguin, Texas, United States
- Education: University of Texas at Austin; University of Texas at El Paso
- Occupation: Novelist
- Writing career
- Notable works: True Women; Hill Country; Will's War
- Notable awards: Father of Texas Award; El Paso Women's Hall of Fame

Janice Woods Windle (born 1938) is an author of historical novels. She grew up in Seguin, Texas and lives in El Paso, Texas with her husband and family.

== Biography ==
Windle was raised in Seguin, Texas. Both of her parents were "avid historians," who brought Windle with them when they conducted research in public libraries.

She attended the University of Texas in Austin where she was a member of Alpha Phi women's fraternity, before taking her degree from the University of Texas at El Paso (UTEP). Windle met her husband, Wayne Windle, when she was at the University of Texas at Austin.

Windle worked for Lyndon Johnson's 1964 presidential campaign for El Paso County. During the 1970s, she worked for the mayor's office and developed a plan to preserve the Magoffin Home. For many years, Windle was President of the El Paso Community Foundation. Windle started in 1977, when the foundation was first formed.

Windle earned academic honors including Mortar Board and the American Association of University Women's "Woman of the Year." She also received a Father of Texas Award, and the Texas Legislature passed a bill commending her on her superb contributions to the citizens of Texas. Windle has been inducted into the El Paso Women's Hall of Fame.

== Work ==
Windle's novels, True Women, Hill Country, and Will's War are based on extensive research on her ancestors. On the first page of True Women the author says, "The vivid stories of the women in my family had been passed down mother to daughter, grandmother to granddaughter, aunt to niece and even father to daughter, for six generations..."

In the introduction to her True Women Cookbook, on pages IX through XI, the author tells how an idea for a collection of family recipes as a wedding present for her son grew into the novel that came out before the cookbook did.

True Women is written in three parts, a sweeping saga of women caught up in the passions and actions their times, from the Texas Revolution and the Civil War until the end of World War II. The book has been published in eight different languages. On the book jacket, James A. Michener said Windle "performed a family miracle ... She recalls vivid scenes from her family's past, but also weaves them into a well-constructed novel." Publishers Weekly called True Women an "unusual, intriguing blend of historical novel and family memoir."

The novel was the source for a Hallmark Entertainment miniseries of the same name that originally aired on CBS in 1997. It starred Dana Delany, Annabeth Gish, and the as-yet-unknown Angelina Jolie. Supporting actors included Tina Majorino, Michael Greyeyes, Michael York, Charles S. Dutton, Julie Carmen, Powers Boothe. True Women was filmed on location in Seguin, Texas.

Her second novel, Hill Country, is based on her father's mother, Laura Hoge Woods. A determined and independent woman, her life began in frontier days and overlapped the childhood and career of her neighbor's son, Lyndon Baines Johnson.

Windle's third novel is Will's War is largely a courtroom drama, based on the life of her mother's father, a German-American. Active in the farmers' union movement, Will Bergfeld was swept up in ethnic troubles when war with Germany broke out. He was put on trial in federal court along with dozens of other activists. Windle obtained the 80-year-old trial transcript and wove it into a dramatic climax. Library Journal described the book as having a "compelling narrative."
