= Cynthia Farah =

American photographer and writer

Cynthia Weber Farah Haines (born 1949) is an American photographer and writer. She is best known for her work on documenting Southwest writers and art and life in El Paso, Texas. Farah has also taught at the University of Texas at El Paso (UTEP) where she was involved with the university's first film studies program.

== Biography ==
Farah was born in Long Island to a military family, and came to El Paso when she was ten. She earned her bachelor's degree from Stanford University, majoring in communications. Later, Farah worked as a production assistant to Otto Preminger, and she worked on his film, Such Good Friends (1971). She moved back to El Paso where she studied for an advanced degree at the University of Texas at El Paso (UTEP). She also married into the Farah family, the owners of the Farah Manufacturing Company. In 1989, Farah became an associate member of the Western Writers of America. She started a three-year term on the Texas Committee for the Humanities in 1992. Also in 1992, she was inducted into the El Paso Women's Hall of Fame. In 1995, UTEP started a film studies program and Farah became the program's director. Farah had a cameo appearance in the Cesar Alejandro film, Down for the Barrio (1996).

== Work ==
Farah's book, Literature & Landscape: Writers of the Southwest (1988) includes photographs and biographies of fifty writers from the Southwestern United States. The Santa Fe Reporter wrote that Literature & Landscape "missed the mark," and felt "incomplete," but that it was also "worth taking a look at." The writers were chosen based on where they lived and their chosen subject matter. Farah enlisted the help of a librarian, Mary Sarber, to discover some of the writers. Later, Farah showed some of the photographs she'd taken for the book in a 1994 exhibit at the El Paso Museum of Art.

Farah and Miguel Juárez worked on a bilingual book about El Paso's murals called Colors on Desert Walls: The Murals of El Paso, in 1997. The book covers the history of murals in the city, includes interviews with ten Chicano artists and color photographs. The El Paso Times wrote, "Farah's photographs, while undersized and too blue in the volume, nonetheless convey a documentary representation of the murals."

== Selected bibliography ==
- Literature & Landscape: Writers of the Southwest. El Paso, Texas: Texas Western Press. 1988. ISBN 9780874042061.
- Los Murales: Guide and Maps to the Murals of El Paso. With Miguel Juárez. El Paso, Texas: Junior League of El Paso. 1992. OCLC 36174766.
- Colors on Desert Walls: The Murals of El Paso. With Miguel Juárez. El Paso, Texas: Texas Western Press. 1997. ISBN 9780874042368.
- Showtime!: From Opera Houses to Picture Palaces in El Paso. El Paso, Texas: Texas Western Press. 2006. ISBN 9780874043037.
