= Mary Irene Stanton =

American teacher and library founder

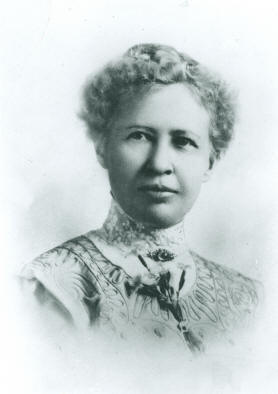
- Mary Irene Stanton, founder of the El Paso Public Library in Texas.
- Born: February 11, 1862; Whitfield County, Georgia, US
- Died: August 26, 1946 (aged 84); El Paso, Texas, US
- Occupations: Teacher; president of the El Paso Library Association; librarian
- Known for: Founding the El Paso Public Library

Mary Irene Stanton (February 11, 1862 – August 26, 1946) was an American teacher and the founder of the El Paso Public Library. She was born in Georgia and taught for many years before the founding of the library, and continued to teach after leaving her position as president of the El Paso Public Library Association.

== Education and early teaching career ==
Stanton attended the University of North Georgia, then called the North Georgia Agricultural College, to receive her teaching degree. She also received her B.S. from the Austin Female Seminary, which was located in Plainville, Georgia. In 1884, she left Georgia to live in El Paso, Texas. She began teaching a third-grade class the same year. Stanton attended Canterbury College, then called Central Normal College, to further pursue teaching. Stanton began teaching again in 1886.

== Founding of the library and role in El Paso Public Library Association ==
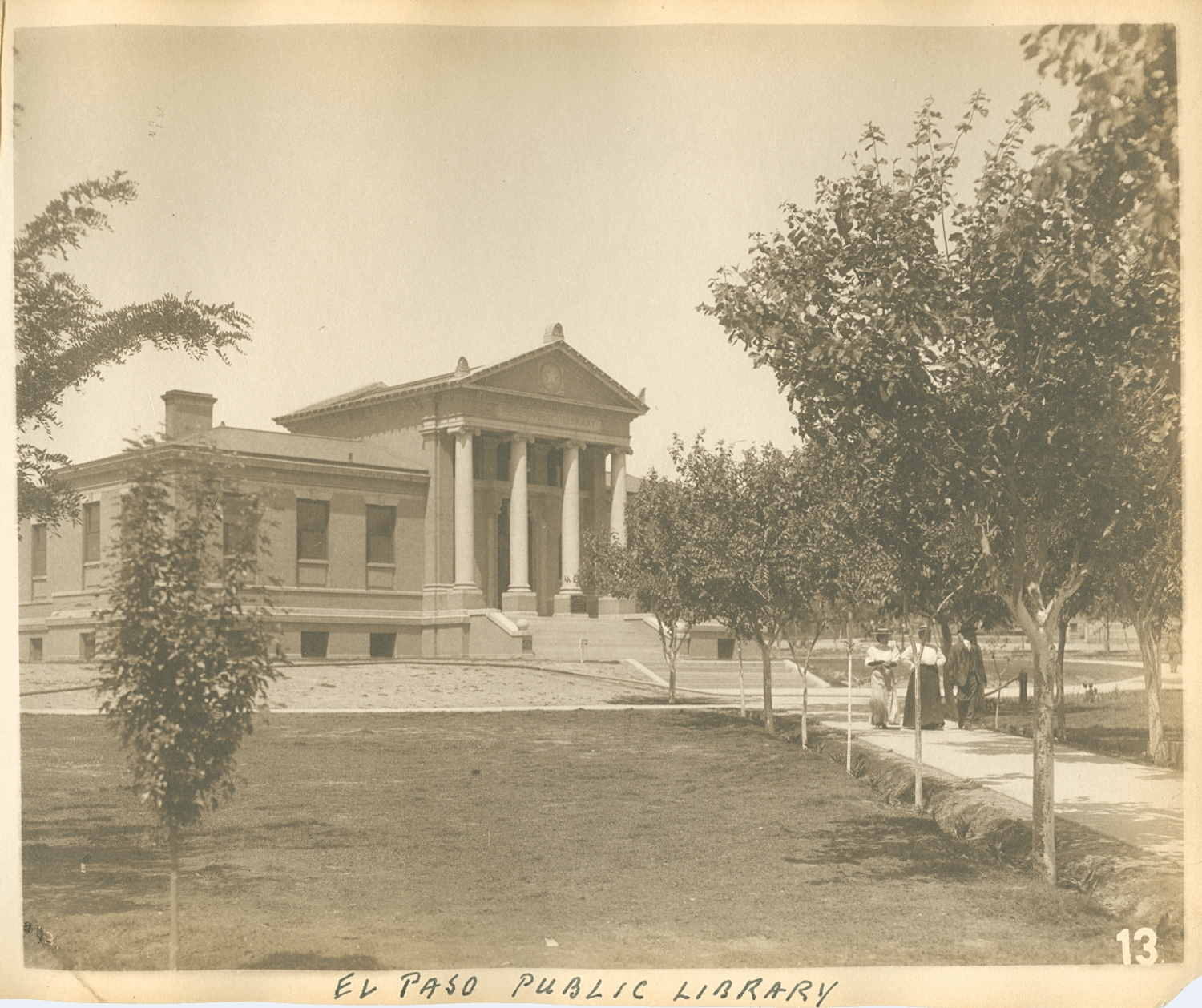
The original El Paso Public Library building.

Stanton started a reading club in 1894; she made her collection of 600-800 books available to her high-school students. The collection was soon made available to women and men of all ages. Volunteers helped to keep the library open. Her library grew quickly, and the books were soon transferred to a larger room.

By 1896, the El Paso Public Library association was founded with five members, and she was its president. The library's 2,000 books were transferred to a room in City Hall after El Paso citizens petitioned for a larger library space.

The library association sought and received a grant from Andrew Carnegie to build a library building independent of the city hall. The library was opened in April 1904. Stanton left her position as president of the library association in 1903.

== Later teaching career and retirement ==
In 1916, Stanton resigned from the public school system in El Paso. By 1921 she left El Paso for Tularosa, New Mexico, and continued to teach there until 1925. She returned to El Paso in 1928, where she remained until her death in 1946.
