= Sandra Rushing =

American women's college basketball coach

Career information
- College: Alabama (1982–1986)
- Position: Head coach
- Coaching career: 1989–2023

Career history

Coaching
- 1989–1990: Millsaps
- 1990–2001: UTEP
- 2001–2002: Henderson State
- 2002–2012: Delta State
- 2012–2023: Central Arkansas

Sandra Rushing is an American women's college basketball coach. She has served as head coach at the University of Texas at El Paso (UTEP), Delta State University, and the University of Central Arkansas (UCA). When she left UTEP, she had the best record for women's basketball in the school's history. Rushing was inducted into the El Paso Women's Hall of Fame in 1999.

== Biography ==
Rushing grew up on a farm in Wool Market, Mississippi. She graduated from the University of Alabama in 1986 with a bachelor's degree in physical education. She played basketball at Alabama and was named a defensive MVP. She earned her master's degree in Health, Physical Education and Recreation from Delta State University in 1989. While at Delta, she worked as a graduate coach with Lloyd Clark.

Rushing started her professional career in coaching at Millsaps College in the 1989–90 season. She started as head coach for women's basketball at the University of Texas at El Paso (UTEP) in May 1990. At UTEP, she ran summer camps for kids, working with other coaches like Don Haskins. Haskins was also her mentor at UTEP. For the 1997–98 school year, she was named the Western Athletics Conference (WAC) Mountain Division co-Coach of the Year. She was inducted into the El Paso Women's Hall of Fame in 1999. Rushing resigned as a coach from UTEP in 2001. By the time that Rushing left UTEP, she had a 123–175 record, making her the "winningest women's basketball coach in the history of Texas-El Paso."

After leaving UTEP, she coached for a year at Henderson State University. In 2002, she started coaching at Delta State University. Rushing was named the Gulf South Conference West Division Coach of the Decade in 2010. In 2012, Rushing became the head coach of the basketball program at the University of Central Arkansas (UCA). At UCA, she continued her defensive strategy for her women's basketball teams.

Rushing resigned as UCA head coach on February 25, 2023, citing her ongoing care for her ailing mother. She had missed eight games during the 2022–23 season due to her care obligations.
