= Gloria Osuna Perez =

Chicana artist

Gloria Osuna Perez (November 21, 1947 – June 25, 1999) was a Chicana artist. She had a pottery line, but is best known for her paintings. Her work is part of the permanent collection of the El Paso Museum of Art.

== Biography ==
Osuna Perez was born in Madera, California on November 21, 1947. Her parents were migrant farm workers and Osuna Perez also worked in San Joaquin Valley fields picking fruit. She moved to El Paso in 1985. Before she returned to painting, Osuna Perez worked on a Mexican pottery line, called Pottery En Español. Not long after moving to El Paso, she began painting again.

Osuna Perez was the featured artist in Latina Magazine in 1996. That same year, she also debuted her "Coyolxauhqui Madre Cosmia" exhibit at the El Paso Museum of Art.

In 1996, Osuna Perez was told that she had six months to live after being diagnosed with ovarian cancer. She made her own funeral urn. She created several urns, "representing continuous faith," according to the El Paso Times. Creating the urns helped her stay positive in the face of the cancer diagnosis. Osuna Perez died on June 25, 1999. A memorial fund in her name supports art education at the El Paso Museum of Art. Osuna Perez was inducted into the El Paso Women's Hall of Fame in 2001. In 2008, her work was displayed at the National Museum of Mexican Art.

== Work ==
Osuna Perez often used Mexican-American people as subjects for her art. She also painted the daily routines and lives of people.

One of Osuna Perez's last works was three illustrations for the book, Little Gold Star/Estrellita de Oro. Her daughter, Lucia Angela Perez, helped finish the illustrations for the book. The Austin Chronicle called the illustrations by mother and daughter "vibrant."
