= Catherine B. Kistenmacher =

Catherine "Kitty" Burnett Kistenmacher (February 4, 1927 – October 3, 2008) was an American artist from El Paso, Texas in the late 20th century and the early 21st century. Kistenmacher was involved in the creation of the International Museum of Art. She is a 2007 inductee into the El Paso Women's Hall of Fame.

== Biography ==
Kistenmacher was born Catherine Burnett on February 4, 1927. She moved with her family to El Paso, Texas in 1931. She attended El Paso High School. Kistenmacher was a member of the Rho Delta Chapter of Chi Omega while she was a student at the College of Mines and Metallurgy, would later be known as the University of Texas at El Paso (UTEP). In 1988, she was named an Outstanding Alumna at the 50th anniversary celebration of the chapter. She graduated from UTEP in 1948. In 1951, she married George Glen Kistenmacher, who she met while in college. They had four children together.

Kistenmacher became involved in the El Paso art community around 1979. Because of Kistenmacher, the City of El Paso was persuaded to allow the International Association for the Visual Arts (IAVA) to open the International Museum of Art in the building that once housed the El Paso Museum of Art. She helped obtain artifacts for the new museum. When the International Museum opened in 1999, she was a co-chair of the first exhibit, "Masterpiece Mine." She later became the docent coordinator for the International Museum of Art. In 2002, she became the president of the El Paso Art Association. She was also a longtime member of the Women's Department of the El Paso Chamber of Commerce, where she served more than 20 years in various leadership capacities. In 2007, she was inducted into the El Paso Women's Hall of Fame.

Kistenmacher had her last show, "Semi-Abstract Acrylics," in August 2008 at the Crossland Gallery in El Paso. She died on October 3, 2008, after a short illness. An art scholarship was created in her name after her death by the El Paso Art Association.
