= Josefina Villamil Tinajero =

Mexican-American author

- Born: Chihuahua City, Mexico

Academic background
- Education: University of Texas at El Paso; Texas A&M University

Josefina Villamil Tinajero is a Mexican-American educator and author. Her work and writing are focused on bilingual literacy, and improving student outcomes in higher education. Tinajero has served as president of the National Association for Bilingual Education (NABE) and has worked as a professor of bilingual education at the University of Texas at El Paso (UTEP). Tinajero later became the dean of the College of Education at UTEP. According to El Diario de El Paso, she is an expert in bilingual education. She is also a member of the El Paso Women's Hall of Fame.

== Biography ==
Tinajero was born in the state of Chihuahua and lived in Ciudad Juárez until she was three before moving to El Paso, Texas. When Tinajero first started school, she didn't know how to speak English. She learned English at school, but retained her Spanish-speaking skills by using them at home. She attended a private Catholic high school and met her future husband, Roberto Tinajero, at while working to pay for her school tuition. She married Roberto in 1970, when she was a sophomore at UTEP. They would eventually have four children together. During her time as a student at UTEP, she was one of "just a handful of Hispanic undergraduate women studying" there.

Tinajero began teaching at UTEP in 1981. Later, she earned her doctorate in education in 1986 from Texas A&M. Also in 1986, she started a successful program where Latino parents, especially mothers, help encourage their children to attend college. The first iteration of it was called the "Educational Enhancement for Mothers and Daughters Program" or the "Mother-Daughter Program." The program originally focused on Mexican-American girls because they had one of the highest risks of dropping out of school or going to college. The majority of students in the program, which is now available for fathers and sons, finish high school and attend college.

Between 1997 and 2000 she was the president of the National Association for Bilingual Education (NABE). In 2002, she was awarded "Texas Professor of the Year" by the Carnegie Foundation for the Advancement of Teaching. The Mexican government recognized her contribution to bilingual education in 2016 by giving her the Ohtli Award.

== Publications ==
- ——; Alma Flor Ada, eds. (1993). The Power of Two Languages: Literacy and Biliteracy for Spanish-speaking students. New York: Macmillan. ISBN 9780021781324.
- ——; Robert A. DeVillar, eds. (2000). The Power of Two Languages 2000: Effective Dual-Language Use Across the Curriculum. New York: McGraw-Hill School Division. ISBN 9780021869343.
