= Shanaya Fastje =

American singer-songwriter

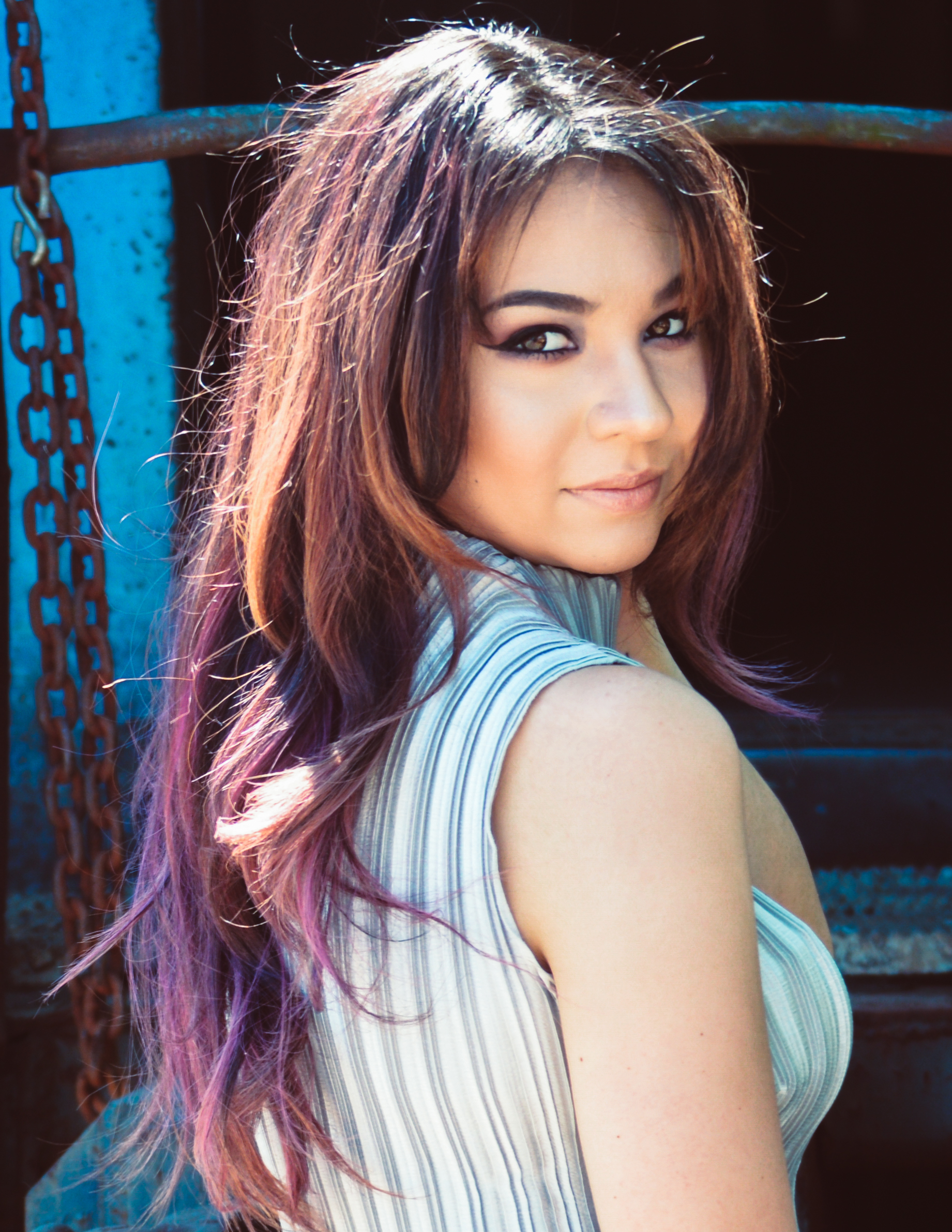
- Fastje in Nashville, Tennessee
- Born: April 13, 1999 (age 27); El Paso, Texas
- Occupations: Author, singer-songwriter, motivational speaker
- Writing career
- Pen name: Shanaya
- Years active: 2008–present
- Genres: Science fiction, fantasy
- Subjects: Bullying, motivation
- Notable works: Mystery School, Mystery School Monday Sleepover Disaster, Mystery School Crazy Adventures and Bully in the Mirror
- Website: shanayafastje.com

Shanaya Fastje (born April 13, 1999, in El Paso, Texas) is an American writer, singer-songwriter, and motivational speaker.

== Early life ==
Shanaya Fastje is the daughter of Lothar and Connie Fastje. At 12 years old she moved to Los Angeles to further pursue her singing, writing, acting, and speaking career. Shanaya attended various schools until she graduated High School with honors on May 10, 2012, at the age of thirteen. In 2010 and 2011, Shanaya was a member of The Youth Council (for high school students) in El Paso Texas after City Hall granted special permission for her to serve.

== Career ==
=== Published works ===
She has written and published five books titled Mystery School, Mystery School: Monday Sleepover Disaster, Mystery School: Crazy Adventures, Bully in the Mirror, and Velvet Door Society. Bully in the Mirror is a curriculum style self-help book mainly directed to teens, young adults, and adults.

=== Public speaking ===
Shanaya began public speaking at the age of ten, after publishing her first two books. Shanaya has spoken at various schools, orphanages and universities including The University of Southern California (USC), California State University San Bernardino (CSU), La Vern University, and The Queen Mary. She has traveled across the United States, teaching how to build self-confidence and combat bullying.

=== Television appearances ===
She is known for her television appearances such as The Jeff Probst Show and Hit Me Up!.

== Awards and recognition ==
Shanaya has received:

- President Obama "President's Volunteer Service Award" in 2011
- Governor Rick Perry "Shining Star of Texas Award" in 2009
- The City of Burbank California's "Austin Cook Award for Outstanding Youth" on May 7, 2013
- Prudential Financial and The National Association of Secondary School Principals "The Spirit of Community Award" in 2011
- United Way "Appreciation for her National Anti-Bullying Program 'Bully in the Mirror'
- Kohl's Department Stores "Super Star Award" in 2010, 2011 and 2012, Landmark LTD.
- "Extraordinary Book: Mystery School" Award For Excellence from over 3,000 entries in 2008
- My One School Incorporated (Charity) "Super Star Award" in recognition for leadership in promoting literacy globally in 2009.
