= Polly Harris =

American politician (1924–1987)

- Born: Pauline Adair Elstein; December 6, 1924; Kansas City, Missouri, US
- Died: December 6, 1987 (aged 63); El Paso, Texas, US
- Education: Kansas City Junior College (AA); University of Missouri at Kansas City (BA)
- Occupation(s): Politician, theater enthusiast
- Spouse: Paul Harris (m. 1949)

Polly Harris (born Pauline Adair Elstein; December 6, 1924 – December 6, 1987) was a Texas politician and theater enthusiast. Harris was one of the first women politicians in El Paso. She was known for serving on the City Council and supporting local theater. A senior center in El Paso is named after her.

== Biography ==
Harris was born Pauline Adair Elstein in Kansas City, Missouri, on December 6, 1924. As early as nine, she began to get interested in the theater and at 17, had directed her first play. In 1943, she graduated with an associate degree in art from Kansas City Junior College and two years later, earned a bachelor's degree in psychology from the University of Missouri at Kansas City. She married Paul Harris in 1949 and the couple moved to Las Cruces, New Mexico, and then to El Paso a year later.

Between 1950 and 1959, Harris worked for radio stations, KSET and KEPO, and then later, until 1968, worked in advertising. Harris became involved in theater in El Paso in 1952, playing in a comedy at the Turn of the Century Theater. She also helped raise money for the theater. Harris was also involved in leadership positions in other theaters, including serving on the board of directors for the El Paso Playhouse. Both Harris and the mayor of El Paso, Tom Westfall, had small parts in the film, The Border (1982).

Harris first ran for office in 1977, running for a new City Council position. She was the sixth woman in El Paso to run for council and the first woman to serve three terms in that office. In office, she was considered a moderate vote and focused on tourism and advocating for women and the elderly. She also supported equality for Hispanic people in El Paso. In office, Harris jokingly called herself an "alderbroad." Harris was also the first woman to serve as mayor pro tempore, when she presided over City Council on February 19, 1980. Harris also ran, unsuccessfully for mayor of El Paso in 1985. She lost another bid for City Council in 1986, and had planned to run again for mayor in 1989. Harris also served as the chair of the El Paso Women's Political Caucus.

== Death and legacy ==
Harris collapsed at a friend's house on December 4, 1987, and went into a coma. She died of a brain aneurysm on December 6, 1987. At her funeral, there were more than 700 people attending the service at the Martin Funeral Chapel. A scholarship in her name was created by the El Paso Women's Political Caucus. In 1989, a senior center on the West side of El Paso was constructed and named after Polly Harris. A memorial for Harris was placed at the Transmountain Optimist Club bicycle track in 1989. She is an honorary member of the El Paso Women's Hall of Fame.
