= Ginger Kerrick =

American physicist

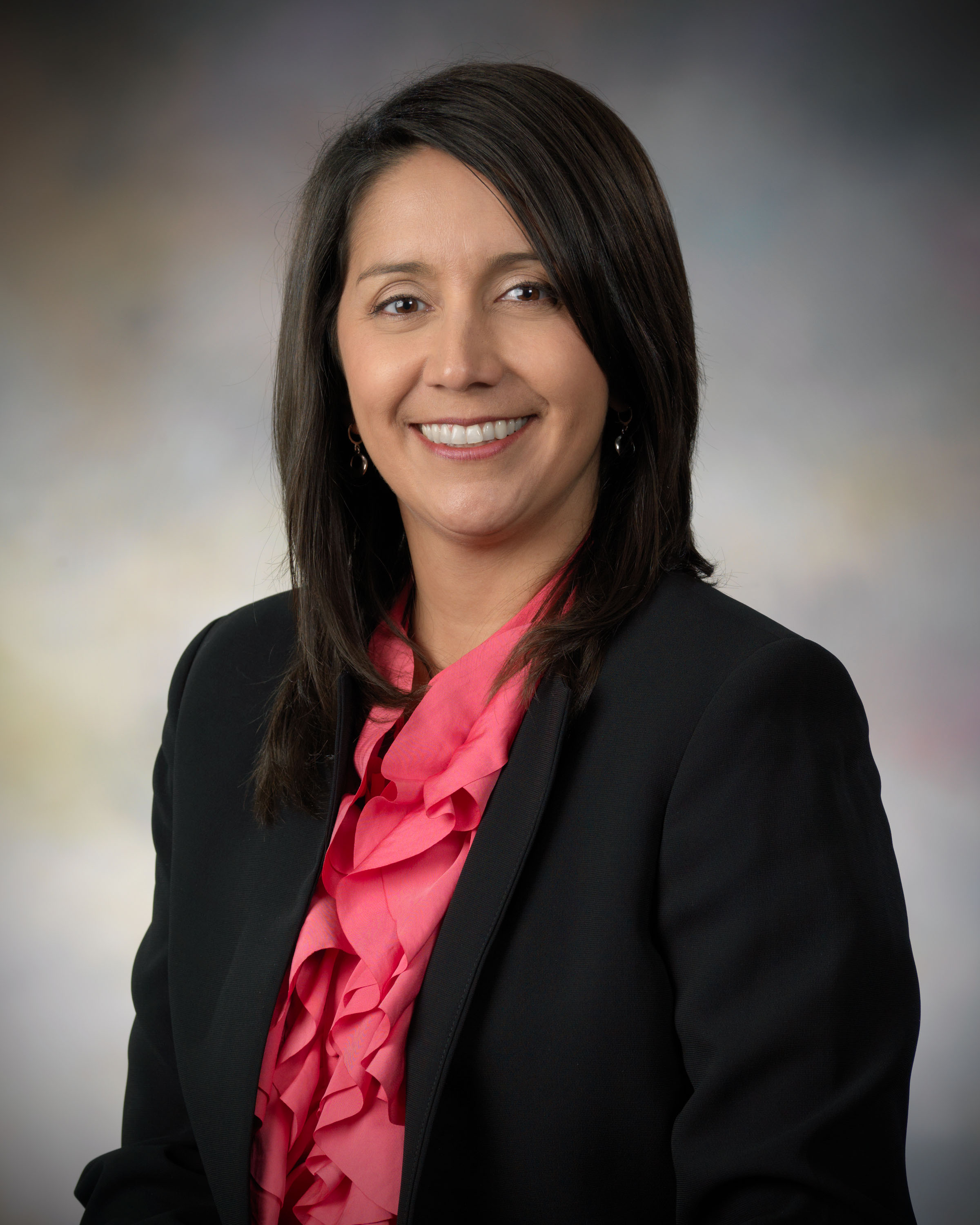
- Born: 1970 (age 55–56); El Paso, Texas, U.S.
- Education: Texas Tech University (BS, MS)
- Occupation: Physicist
- Known for: First female Hispanic flight director at NASA
- Scientific career
- Fields: Physics
- Workplaces: Johnson Space Center
- Thesis: Infrared deep level transient spectroscopy (1993)

Ginger Kerrick is an American physicist at NASA's Lyndon B. Johnson Space Center. She is the first Hispanic female to be flight director at NASA.

== Education ==
Kerrick graduated second in her class from Hanks High School in El Paso, Texas, and was named El Paso Female Athlete of the Year. She started her college degree at the University of Texas at El Paso, where she walked onto their women's basketball team. During the first game of the season, she blew out her knee, ending her basketball career. She then transferred to Texas Tech University to get her Bachelor of Science and a Master of Science in physics. Her 1993 master's thesis was entitled Infrared deep level transient spectroscopy.

== Career ==
Kerrick was a summer intern at NASA in 1991, which first led to a co-op position and ultimately a full-time employment as a materials research engineer with NASA in May, 1994. Kerrick interviewed for the astronaut program, but was disqualified for kidney stones. She became the first non-astronaut Capsule Communicator (Capcom), first Russian-training-integration instructor, and the first Hispanic female NASA flight director in 2005. She served as flight director with NASA's Lyndon B. Johnson Space Center from 2005 to 2012.

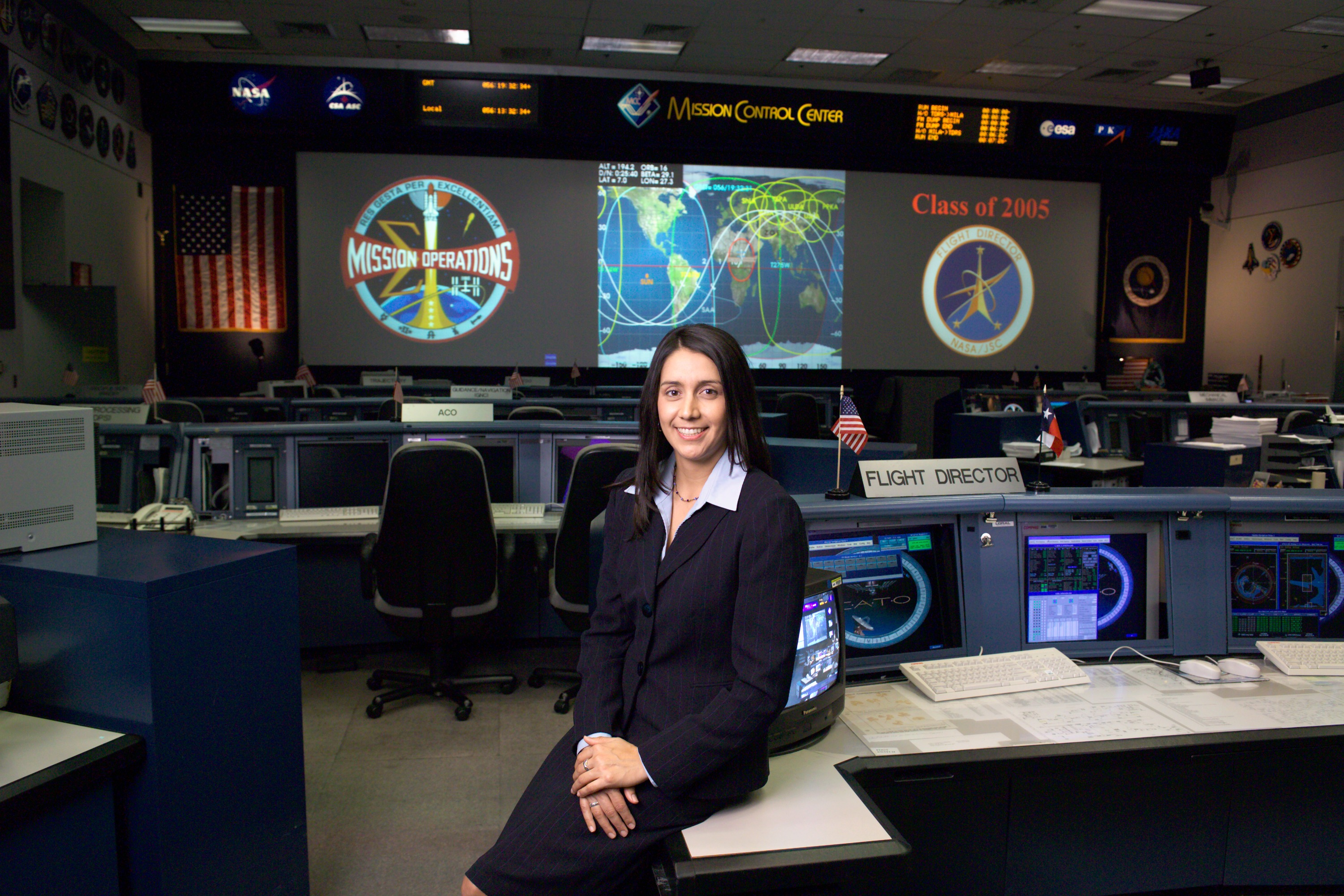
Ginger Kerrick at NASA

There, she created plans for scenarios of astronauts in space which assisted ISS and shuttle operations, making her a dual-certified flight director. She currently is the division chief of the Flight Integration Division in FOD (Flight Operations Directorate) since August 2016. Kerrick is a member of the American Physical Society (APS).

In November 2021 Kerrick decided to quit her engagement at NASA and moved to Barrios Technology, LTD in Houston, Texas where she took over the role as Chief Strategy Officer.
