= Blanca Enriquez =

American educator

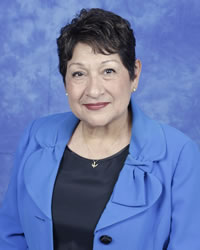
Blanca Enriquez

Blanca Estella Enriquez is an American educator. She is currently the Director of Head Start in the United States.

== Biography ==
Enriquez was born in Ciudad Juárez, moved to the United States when she was 6 and was raised in El Segundo Barrio in El Paso, Texas. Enriquez attended Bowie High School, where she graduated at the top ten percent of her class.

Enriquez was first a teacher's aide in 1973. Enriquez later started teaching English as a second language to kindergartners and first graders in El Paso, Texas. She became the head of the Region 19 Head Start program in 1986. Enriquez served as the director of the El Paso region's Head Start program for 21 years. Enriquez was named the director of the federal Head Start program in April 2015.
