= Leona Ford Washington =

American activist

Leona Ford Washington (1928 – August 5, 2007) was a community activist in Texas and founder of the McCall Neighborhood Center in El Paso. She taught for 39 years in the El Paso Independent School District. Washington composed the song, "The City of El Paso," which was adopted as the city's official song in the 1980s.

== Biography ==
Washington was born in El Paso, Texas. She grew up in Segundo Barrio, and went to Prairie View A&M College (now Prairie View A&M University). Washington taught for two years in Las Cruces, before she returned to El Paso where she started teaching at the "segregated Douglass School."

In 1983, Washington founded the McCall Neighborhood Center and served as the first executive director of the facility which served both African American and Mexican American communities in El Paso. Washington took over The Southwest Torch Newspaper, renaming it The Good Neighbor Interpreter. The Good Neighbor provided residents of El Paso news about the black community.

== Legacy ==
A City of El Paso recreation center, located on East Missouri Avenue is named after Washington. A foundation to help high school graduates attend college was set up in her name. Washington also donated, in 1991, her collection of over 800 historic photographs to the University of Texas at El Paso (UTEP).
