= The Royalty (band) =

American rock band

- Origin: El Paso, Texas
- Genres: Indie rock, alternative rock, post-punk
- Years active: 2005–2013
- Label: Victory
- Members: Nicole Boudreau; Jesus Apodaca; Mike Hernandez; Daniel Marin; Joel Quintana
- Past members: Will Daugherty; Shane Del Robles; Michael Soto; Luis Alejandro Orozco; Val Hinojosa; Blake Duncan
- Website: www.theroyalty.net

The Royalty is an American indie rock band formed in 2005. Based in El Paso, Texas, the group has released two studio albums and one EP. Victory Records signed the band after the release of their self-titled album. They released their full-length album Lovers in May 2012.

== Musical style and themes ==
The Royalty has been described as having retro influence ranging from the 1960s rock to 1970's soul. Their music has recently been featured on MTV and SpikeTV shows and the band has been tagged as an MTV Buzzworthy artist. Lead singer, Nicole Boudreau's vocal style has been compared to artists like Amy Winehouse and Adele as well as older singers like Etta James.

== Band members ==
- Nicole Boudreau – vocals
- Jesus Apodaca – guitar
- Mike Hernandez – bass guitar
- Daniel Marin– keyboards
- Joel Quintana – drums

== Discography ==
Albums

| Year | Title |
|---|---|
| 2010 | The Royalty |
| 2012 | Lovers |

EPs

- The Royalty – EP (2008)

== Videography ==
- "Chinese Fire Drill" (2008)
- "How I Like 'Em" (2012)
- "Bartender" (2012)
- "I Want You" (2012)
