= El Paso Herald-Post =

Newspaper published in El Paso, Texas

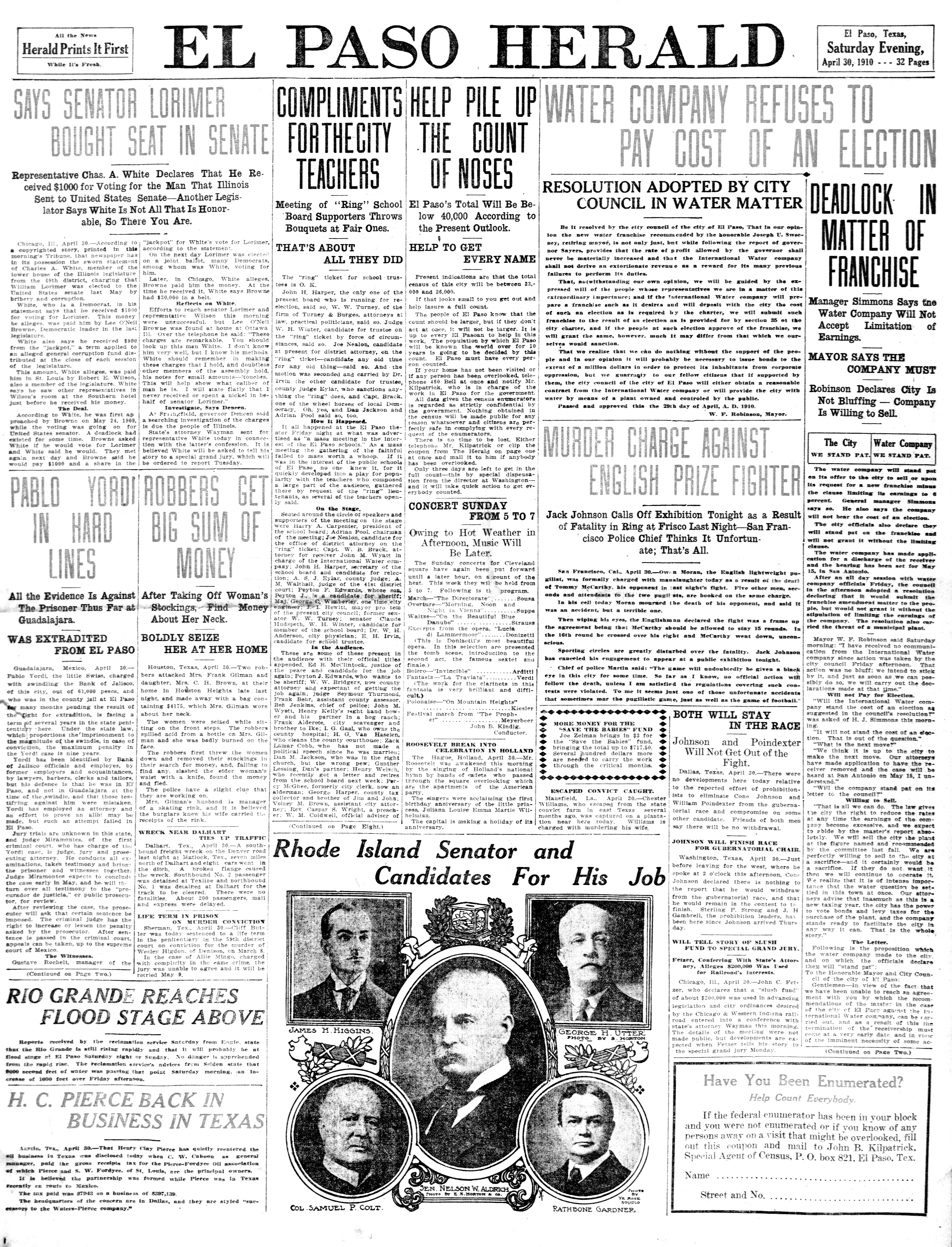
- Front page of the El Paso Herald. April 30, 1910.
- Type: Afternoon daily newspaper
- Owner: E. W. Scripps Company
- Founded: 1931
- Ceased publication: 1997
- Language: English
- Headquarters: El Paso, Texas

The El Paso Herald-Post was an afternoon daily newspaper in El Paso, Texas, United States. It was the successor to the El Paso Herald, first published in 1881, and the El Paso Post, founded by the E. W. Scripps Company in 1922. The papers merged in 1931 under Scripps ownership.

The Herald-Post was nominated for two Pulitzer Prizes in 1987 for a story about a Mexican drug lord and for its literacy campaign. It later launched the El Paso area's first online news site in 1996. When the Scripps-Howard newspaper chain shut the paper down in 1997, it cited a substantial decline in circulation, similar to that experienced by other afternoon newspapers in the U.S. at the time.

On August 24, 2015, a former local news employee revived the El Paso Herald-Post brand by launching a website with the same name. However, the online-only publication has no affiliation with the former newspaper.

In various interviews regarding the re-launch of the news site, the new owner, also a former sports stringer for the original Herald-Post, stated that his desire to bring back a version of the news site was to "correct a horrendous error by the paper's former owners...by throwing away 100+ years of work by thousands of dedicated employees."

From 2015 to 2021, the online version of the Herald-Post enjoyed a brief resurgence of popularity by not only reporting the news, but by live streaming select high school and semi-pro sporting events, parades and band competitions. The website won "Best Website in El Paso" in 2017.

In 2021 the website was briefly placed for sale, however a disagreement between the owner and a former staffer of the Herald-Post employed by the site led to the owner to allow the domains to expire and ending the site. In another interview, the owner stated, "it was a good run, but it really wasn't mine - I simply borrowed it to make sure it didn't stay on the trash heap...and all the work the staff did previous to this version didn't just fade away...maybe someone else will do the same in the future."

When the website was shut down in early 2022, it had garnered over 35 million hits over the seven year run.
