= North Hills, El Paso, Texas =

North Hills
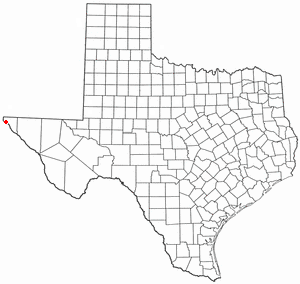
- Location in the state of Texas
- Coordinates: 31.923°N 106.438°W
- Country: United States
- State: Texas
- County: El Paso County
- City: El Paso
- Elevation: 3,600 ft (1,100 m)
- Time zone: UTC-6 (MDT)
  - Summer (DST): UTC-6 (CDT)

North Hills is a residential neighborhood in the Northeast section of El Paso, Texas.

The neighborhood is located off U.S. Highway 54 (Patriot Freeway) at the southern end of Martin Luther King Boulevard (Farm to Market Road 3255), on both sides of the street. It consists mainly of detached single-family homes built in the 1990s and has predominantly middle-income residents. North Hills has a neighborhood association (North Hills Neighborhood Pride Association, NHNPA). A portion of it is leased by the US Army as family housing for soldiers stationed at Fort Bliss. Many of the streets have names beginning with "Loma" (Spanish for hill), for example, Loma Clara, Loma del Sur, Loma Roja, Loma Franklin.

North Hills is bordered on the west by a flood-control levee approximately half a mile west of Martin Luther King Boulevard; beyond it is Franklin Mountains State Park, which is closed to development and is open for hiking and biking. To the east, beyond a utility easement about three-eighths of a mile east of Martin Luther King Boulevard on the east side of the Richardson Middle School campus, is the newly developed Sandstone Ranch neighborhood; and to the north is undeveloped land used for grazing and slated for eventual development.

North Hills contains Chuck Heinrich Park, a city park located in the southwestern portion of the neighborhood at the southern end of Andrew Barcena Drive, both of which are named for El Paso police officers killed in the line of duty; the park has a monument dedicated to El Paso law enforcement officers killed in the line of duty and sometimes hosts memorial services dedicated to them.

North Hills is located within the El Paso Independent School District and is zoned to Andress High School and Richardson Middle School, and to Nixon Elementary School (which, like Richardson, is located within North Hills) except for the northwest portion (north of Marcus Uribe Drive to Loma Real Avenue and east of Martin Luther King Boulevard to the utility easement on the east side of the Richardson campus), which is zoned to Tom Lea Elementary School. Nixon Elementary is named for local African-American physician and civil rights hero Dr. Lawrence Nixon and is often referred to as Dr. Nixon Elementary to avoid giving the impression that the school is named for disgraced United States President Richard Nixon.
