= Park Foothills, El Paso, Texas =

Park Foothills
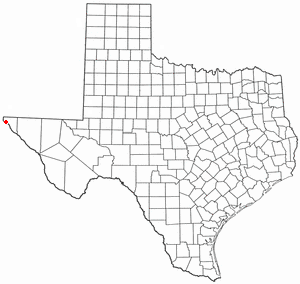
- Location in the state of Texas
- Coordinates: 31.863°N 106.454°W
- Country: United States
- State: Texas
- County: El Paso County
- City: El Paso
- Elevation: 3,600 ft (1,100 m)
- Time zone: UTC-6 (MDT)
  - Summer (DST): UTC-6 (CDT)

Park Foothills is a neighborhood in Northeast El Paso. It is located west of U.S. 54 (the Patriot Freeway) to the Franklin Mountains, and extends north toward the southern boundary of Castner Range, mainly on a hill known as Wingate Point down which Hondo Pass and Hercules Avenue run, which forms part of the eastern foothills of the Franklin Mountains. It encompasses the officially recognized neighborhoods of Park Foothills (located along Magnetic Street between Atlas and Hondo Pass) and Sunrise Acres West, which includes the area east of Echo Street to the Patriot Freeway. Park Foothills is mainly residential and developed piecemeal as part of a slow ongoing process, consisting of apartment complexes of varying sizes and houses of varying styles built either individually or as part of small developments constructed beginning in the early 1950s, with a commercial area along Gateway South Boulevard at its eastern edge and smaller business districts around the intersections of Hercules Avenue and Leo Street, Magnetic Street and Hondo Pass Avenue, and Zion Drive with Alabama Street (which becomes Magnetic Street at Atlas Avenue). Many of Park Foothills' streets are named for minerals or gemstones (Diamond, Garnet, Emerald, Amber, Dolomite, Marble, Galena) or have names with an astronomical theme (Neptune, Comet, Eclipse, Capella, Sirius, Polaris, Leo, Libra, Milky Way, Moonlight). Sunrise Park is the principal neighborhood park in Park Foothills.

Park Foothills lies within the El Paso Independent School District and is zoned entirely to Canyon Hills Middle School, which is located within the neighborhood, as is Edgar Park Elementary School, which is named for prominent early-20th-century El Paso real estate developer Edgar D. Park. All of Park Foothills is zoned to Park Elementary for prekindergarten to fifth grade and Chapin High School for ninth to twelfth grades, except for its eastern edge (east of Mercury Street), which is zoned to Moye Elementary and Irvin High School.
