= Mission Valley (El Paso) =

Mission Valley is an area of El Paso, Texas, United States, which includes part of Eastside and all Lower Valley districts. It is the third largest area of the city, behind East El Paso and Central El Paso. Hawkins Road and Interstate 10 border the Mission Valley. This location is considered the oldest area of El Paso, dating back to the late 17th century when present-day Texas was under the rule of Nueva España (New Spain).

In 1680 the Isleta Pueblo tribe revolted against the Spaniards who were pushed south to what is now El Paso. Some Spaniards and tribe members settled here permanently. Soon afterward, three Spanish missions were built; they remain standing, currently functioning as churches:Ysleta Mission-1682 (La Misión de Corpus Christi y de San Antonio de la Ysleta del Sur/Our Lady of Mt. Carmel), Socorro Mission-1759 (Nuestra Señora de la Purísima Concepción del Socorro)-1759 and San Elizario Chapel (Capilla de San Elcear)-1789.

On April 30, 1598, the northward-bound Spanish and New World Spanish conquistadors crossed large sand dunes about 27 miles south of present-day Downtown El Paso. It is said that the expeditionaries and their horses ran toward the river. Don Juan de Oñate, a New Spain-born conquistador of Spanish parents, was an expedition leader who ordered a big feast north of the Río Grande in what is now Socorro, Texas. This was the first documented and true Thanksgiving in North America. Oñate declared La Toma (taking possession), claiming all territory north of the Río Grande for King Philip II of Spain.

Ysleta Del Sur Pueblo (related to the insurgent Isleta Pueblo Tribe) is also located in this valley. The Tigua (pronounced Tiwa) is one of three Indian tribes in Texas whose sovereignty is recognized by the United States Government. Ysleta is spelled with a "Y" because 19th-century script did not differentiate between a capital "Y" and a capital "I."

Some people in this area and its twin city across the river, Ciudad Juárez, are direct descendants of the Spaniards.

== Neighborhoods ==
Here is a list of some neighborhoods in the Mission Valley:

- Alta Vista
- Cedar Grove Park
- Del Norte Heights
- Hacienda Heights
- Hidden Valley
- Lakeside
- Marion Manor
- Loma Terrace
- Mesa Vista
- Thomas Manor
- Rosedale Manor
- San José
- Tigua
- Ysleta
- Walnut Acres
