= Irvin High School =

Public school in Texas, United States

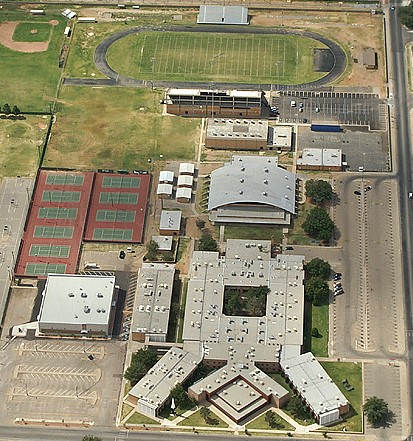
- Aerial view of Irvin High School

Location
- 5400 Sanders Avenue; El Paso, Texas 79924; United States; 31.8797°N 106.4135°W

Information
- School type: Public High School
- Motto: Proud to be a Rocket
- Established: September 1959
- Founders: Dr. O.C. Irvin; Dr. E.H. Irvin; Mr. C.M. Irvin
- School district: El Paso Independent School District
- Superintendent: Diana Sayavedra
- Principal: Robert Stives
- Teaching staff: 71.10 (FTE)
- Grades: 9 to 12
- Enrollment: 951 (2023–2024)
- Student to teacher ratio: 13.38
- Campus: Urban
- Colors: Red; White; Blue
- Fight song: "Fight Irvin, Fight Rockets ● Fight, Fight, Fight... Add Glory to your Name ● Oh, Let's Show Them All ● How to do it Right ● We're going to WIN this Game ● Teamwork and Spirit ● Will make YOU Shine ● When e're we play the game. If ever we lose ● we will never complain ● but forever to WIN our Aim!"
- Athletics conference: 1-5A
- Mascot: Rockets - "Rocketman"
- Rivals: Andress High School ● Chapin High School
- Newspaper: The Observer
- Yearbook: The Orbit
- Website: www.episd.org/o/ihs

Irvin High School is an El Paso Independent School District (EPISD) high school in El Paso, Texas, United States. It opened in September 1959. It is named for Dr. O.C. Irvin, Dr. E.H. Irvin, and Mr. C. M. Irvin. All three of these men were well-known contributors to the El Paso public schools.

== History ==
In 1882, Dr. O. C. Irvin became the first secretary of the El Paso City School District (the forerunner of today's El Paso Independent School District). One of his dreams was to have a good high school in El Paso. He served as president of the school board beginning in 1913. Dr. E. H. Irvin made El Paso High School a reality to help El Paso's overwhelming growth problems. Mr. C. M. Irvin was a member of the El Paso Chamber of Commerce and was the president of the school board from 1955 through April 8, 1958, when he retired.

Mr. Cecil S. Bean was Irvin's first principal, and Mr. Boyd was the first assistant principal.

== Academics ==
Irvin High School serves the central portion of Northeast El Paso, an inner-suburb area of mainly single-family homes and apartment complexes built for the most part in the 1950s and 1960s, except for the Eisenhower-Sahara neighborhood between Dyer Street and McCombs Street which is just south of the Woodrow Bean-Transmountain Road (Texas Loop 375) and the Castner Heights neighborhood, which was built on a tract of former United States Army land bordered by Dyer Street, the Patriot Freeway (US 54), Diana Drive and Hondo Pass Avenue. These contain many newer homes built beginning in the late 1970s, and the Eisenhower-Sahara neighborhood contains a public housing development of duplexes and a fairly large mobile home subdivision for singles and retirees.

Graduation photo of Gabriele Bryant, 1960, Irvin High School

== JROTC ==
In 1962, Irvin High School established its Junior Reserve Officer's Training Corps as the 6th JROTC Battalion as part of the 5th Brigade of Cadets.

== Irvin New Tech ==
Irvin High School was designated a T-STEM academy in 2012 after the Governor's Executive Order RP53 in 2005. The first T-STEM academies opened in the 2006–2007 school year and have since then made great strides in college readiness and competitiveness of Texas high school graduates. "Rocket New Tech" is the name of the platform Irvin High School will use to launch their cohorts of students beginning in their freshman year into Irvin's T-STEM courses. From Irvin's Official website, it states, "Irvin T-STEM pathways include Engineering (Robotics, Electrical, Architecture & Green Energy), Biotechnology, Media Productions, Cyber Security and Computer Technology."

== School Mascot and School Colors ==
The Rocket was chosen as the mascot for Irvin High School because of its close affiliation with the military at nearby Fort Bliss. On that same line, the patriotic colors of Red, White, and Blue were chosen by the coaches and the school board to represent Irvin's pride.

A popular legend is that Irvin High School was made in the shape of a rocket. From an aerial view, the layout of the school does resemble one.

However, this has never been officially confirmed. On November 8, 2016, El Paso voters approved a $668.8 million bond proposal aimed at modernizing campuses within the El Paso Independent School District. Irvin High School was slated over $51 million to renovate and remodel the campus. Exterior buildings that helped shape the image of the "Rocket" have been removed, thus the image of the beloved campus prior to the EPISD Bond is one of a few images remnant of the "rocket-shape".

== Notable alumni ==
- Billy Davis, former NFL player with the Dallas Cowboys and Baltimore Ravens
- Marcus Faison, professional basketball player
- Germaine Franco, film composer, conductor, songwriter, arranger, record producer, and percussionist
- Aulsondro "Novelist" Hamilton, multi-platinum producer, Christian hip-hop artist and actor
- Lorenzo Mendez, singer, two-time Grammy winner
- Ed Stansbury, former UCLA football player, High School 1-5A Discus State Champion, former NFL player
- Sharon Tate, actress, victim of the Tate—LaBianca murders
- Kayla Thornton, forward for the Golden State Valkyries
