= Trans-mountain =

Trans-Mountain or variation, may refer to:

- Trans Mountain pipeline (TM & TMX; "Trans-Mountain"), a petroleum pipeline in British Columbia, Canada
  - Trans Mountain Corporation, the crown corporation operating company for the Trans Mountain pipeline
- Transmountain Early College High School, El Paso, Texas, USA
- TransMountain Road, El Paso, Texas, USA; see Culture of El Paso

== See also ==
- TransMontaigne, a U.S. pipeline company
- Mountain (disambiguation)
- Trans (disambiguation)
