= Angel's Triangle, El Paso, Texas =

Angel's Triangle
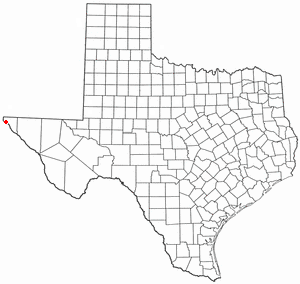
- Location in the state of Texas
- Coordinates: 31.864°N 106.436°W
- Country: United States
- State: Texas
- County: El Paso County
- City: El Paso
- Elevation: 3,600 ft (1,100 m)
- Time zone: UTC-6 (MDT)
  - Summer (DST): UTC-6 (CDT)
- Average Annual Precipitation (inches)= 8.20

Angel's Triangle (formerly Devil's Triangle) is a neighborhood located in Northeast El Paso in El Paso, Texas. It lies within a right triangle bordered by Dyer Street on the east, the Patriot Freeway (U.S. Route 54) on the west, and Hondo Pass Avenue on the north. Dominated by apartment complexes and older duplexes or single-family homes with a high poverty rate among its residents, and once notorious for crime, drug trafficking and prostitution, it was known as the Devil's Triangle before being officially renamed at a meeting of its residents in the 1990s. and is still sometimes referred to as such, or as the Triangle. The neighborhood's commercial portion is along its eastern and northern edges, on Dyer and on Hondo Pass, respectively; there is almost no business development along Gateway North Boulevard at the western edge of the Angel's Triangle.

== Demographics ==
According to the 2000 census, many residents of the area faced poverty, with 65 percent living below the poverty level. Around 1,800 children under 18 lived in Angel's Triangle in 2000.

== History ==
Angel's Triangle was originally nicknamed the "Devil's Triangle" because of the shape of the area and the high crime rate. In the early 1990s, the area experienced high rates of drug dealing, prostitution and gang violence. In 1993, a group was formed by Mr. and Mrs. Luis Aguilera called the Angel's Triangle Association (ATA) which had been identifying community needs for the area. Also in response to crime in the area, police officers led by officer Raul Prieto, decided to implement a program to improve the safety of the neighborhood. This community policing effort was funded by grants under the Violent Crime Control and Law Enforcement Act. The program involved training officers and the community alike to start referring to the neighborhood as the Angel's Triangle, and involved community participation in neighborhood clean-ups. Within three years of implementing the program, there was a 35% decrease in all crimes in the area. The programs enacted in the 90s have helped the neighborhood feel safer, but it still remained a high-crime area in 2003. By 2010, residents reported feeling safe, despite the neighborhood still appearing run-down.

== Education ==
It lies within the El Paso Independent School District and is zoned to Irvin High School and Canyon Hills Middle School; most of it is zoned to Moye Elementary School located just outside the neighborhood to the east, except for the northernmost part, from Maxwell Avenue north to Hondo Pass Avenue, which is zoned to Whitaker Elementary School. Wainwright Elementary School, opened in 1949, closed in 2005, and since used by El Paso ISD as a science center, is located in Angel's Triangle; for many years and for some time after its closure its student clinic also served neighborhood residents who did not attend the school. Part of its playground has been leased to the city of El Paso as a neighborhood park; the only other park in the neighborhood is Wellington Chew Park on Maxwell Avenue off Gateway North, which has a senior citizens' center.

== Parks and recreation ==
The Nolan Richardson Recreation Center is available for afternoon programs for children and teens.
