= Drew Litton =

American cartoonist

Drew Litton (born 1958) is an American cartoonist and one of the last sports cartoonists left in the United States. He is nationally syndicated sports cartoonist though Andrews. Best known for his 25+ years as the creator of the popular Rocky Mountain News "Win, Lose & Drew" sports cartoon, he currently draws for KUSA 9News, ColoradoSun.com, Andrews McMeel syndicate, Colorado Rockies magazine and the Broncos for Kids magazine. His work has been featured on ESPN.com, Chicago Tribune, WGN and Sports Illustrated. He currently resides in Colorado with his wife, Diane and their dogs, Finnegan and Tucker. He publishes a commemorative calendar yearly.

== Early life ==
Litton was born in El Paso, Texas in 1958. He attended Coronado High school and the University of Texas at El Paso. In 1982, he moved to Denver, Colorado.

== Cartooning career ==
Litton was first published when he was hired part-time by the El Paso Times as a copy clerk. By 1979 his cartoons began to appear sporadically on the editorial page and sports section of the Times. He created a comic strip called "The Classes Quo" for the Prospector, the weekly paper of the University of Texas El Paso. In 1982 Litton was hired by the Rocky Mountain News in Denver, Colorado to create a daily feature called "Win, Lose & DREW" for its sports section. It featured a variety of local sports franchises including the Denver Broncos, Denver Nuggets, Colorado Avalanche, and Colorado Rockies as well as local universities. In 1984 his cartoons became syndicated two times a week by United Features syndicate. His work is currently syndicated by Andrews McMeel.

After the Rocky Mountain News closed in 2009, Litton joined the Chicago Tribune to draw a weekly cartoon and ESPN.com to produce not only weekly sports cartoons and illustrations but along with animator Rich Moyer, he created a weekly animated cartoon series based on a pair of sports announcers previewing the weeks upcoming Monday Night Football matchups. Litton also joined KUSA 9News in the fall of 2009 to draw weekly cartoons featuring the Denver Broncos. His work is currently featured in the coloradosun.com opinion section.

== Other works ==
Litton drew an opinion cartoon for the Guadalupe County Communicator in Santa Rosa, New Mexico from 2009 until 2019, featuring Ferrel Hogs appalled by pork green chile, corrupt politicians and the cities favorite tourist attraction, the Blue Hole. It was his favorite feature to date.

Litton created "Duncan's Dilemma", a daily comic strip featuring Duncan, a neurotic postal worker, and his unruly neighbor, Rooster. It was featured in the Rocky Mountain News from January 2000 until late August 2000 when it was discontinued after Litton's diagnosis of testicular cancer in August of the same year. Litton decided the daily deadlines of two daily features proved to be overwhelming amidst radiation treatments.

== Personal life ==
Litton was married in 1989 to Debbie Kitchell until her death from cancer in 2004. He currently lives with his life wife, Diane and their dogs.

== Bibliography ==
- Drew Litton's "Win, lose & Drew" 1987
- Drew'Litton's "Greatest Hits" 1997
- "Give My Regards to Elway" by Drew Litton 2004

== Awards ==
- 1993 Best Sports Cartoonist National Cartoonists Society Divisional Award.
