= Transmountain Early College High School =

Public school in Texas, United States

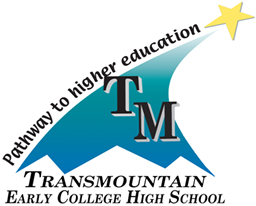

Location
- 9570 Gateway North Boulevard; El Paso, Texas 79924; United States; 31.884327°N 106.438240°W

Information
- Type: Early college high school (charter)
- Motto: "We strive for truth, knowledge, and success on the pathway to higher education."
- Established: 2008
- School district: EPISD
- Principal: Robert Stives
- Faculty: 24.56 (FTE)
- Grades: 9–12
- Enrollment: 454 (2017–18)
- Student to teacher ratio: 18.49
- Classrooms: Portable classrooms
- Campus: Suburban
- Colors: Black, turquoise, silver
- Sports: Intramural only
- Nickname: TMECHS
- Team name: Mavericks
- Yearbook: Maverick Trail
- Website: www.episd.org/tmechs

Transmountain Early College High School (TMECHS) is the early college high school for the El Paso Independent School District in El Paso, Texas, United States.

TMECHS participates in the STEM School program. A collaboration with El Paso Community College allows students to take courses at its Transmountain Campus and receive an associate degree before their high school graduation. It has also collaborated with the University of Texas at El Paso to allow its advanced students to attend UTEP courses in their senior year upon the early completion of their associate degree.

All TMECHS students graduate under the Texas Distinguished Achievement Plan, which requires that they conduct original research under the guidance of professionals in their field. Its students are representative of all geographic areas of the city. A lottery and interview process are used to select the 125 student freshman class each year since 2008.

== Accelerated graduation plan ==
The TMECHS administration have implemented a program to allow advanced TMECHS students to complete their associate degrees by the end of their junior year, and to attend UTEP courses their senior year. The first 27 of these early graduates have completed their EPCC degrees and moved on to four-year universities.

An arrangement was established by the school district to provide bus transportation for TMECHS students to and from UTEP by sharing the bus route already in place for the International Baccalaureate program students of Coronado High School.

== Student spaceflight experiment ==
On STS-134, the Space Shuttle Endeavour launched with the science experiment "Effect of Microgravity on Biofilm Formation by E. coli on Polystyrene Particles" designed by TMECHS Juniors Jarisma Rodriguez and Michelle Holguin, as part of the NCESSE Student Spaceflight Experiments Program. STS-134 was the final mission of the Endeavour and the penultimate mission of NASA's Space Shuttle program.

== Admission ==
To qualify for admission, students must:

- Pass the 8th grade TAKS on the first attempt
- Maintain at least a 70% average in middle school
- Send in an application
- Conduct an interview

== Sports ==
TMECHS does not offer school-sponsored competitive sports. However, it does offer intramural sports including American football, volleyball, soccer, and basketball.

== Music ==
TMECHS offers band, orchestra, piano, and guitar as electives, and participates in district-sponsored musical competitions such as Solo & Ensemble or All-Region competitions on an individual basis.

== Clubs ==
- Craft
- PBIS Student Ambassadors
- Student Council
- Yearbook
- Drumline
- On the Edge Theater
- Dance KRU
- Community Service
- Cheerleading
- Chess Club
- Dungeons & Dragons

== Degree plans ==
This is a comprehensive list of the associate degree plans available for TMECHS students.

=== Associate of Science ===
- Architecture
- Biology
- Biological Sciences-Pre Dentistry
- Biological Sciences-Pre Medicine,
- Biological Sciences-Pre Pharmacy
- Biological Sciences-Pre Veterinary
- Chemistry
- General Studies
- Geological Sciences
- Mathematics
- Physics
- AP Psychology

=== Associate of Arts ===
- Computer Science
- Civil Engineering
- Computer Engineering
- Electrical/Electronic Engineering
- Industrial/Mechanical/Metallurgical/Materials Engineering
- Teacher Preparation
