= Marcus Faison =

Belgian-American former professional basketball player (born 1978)

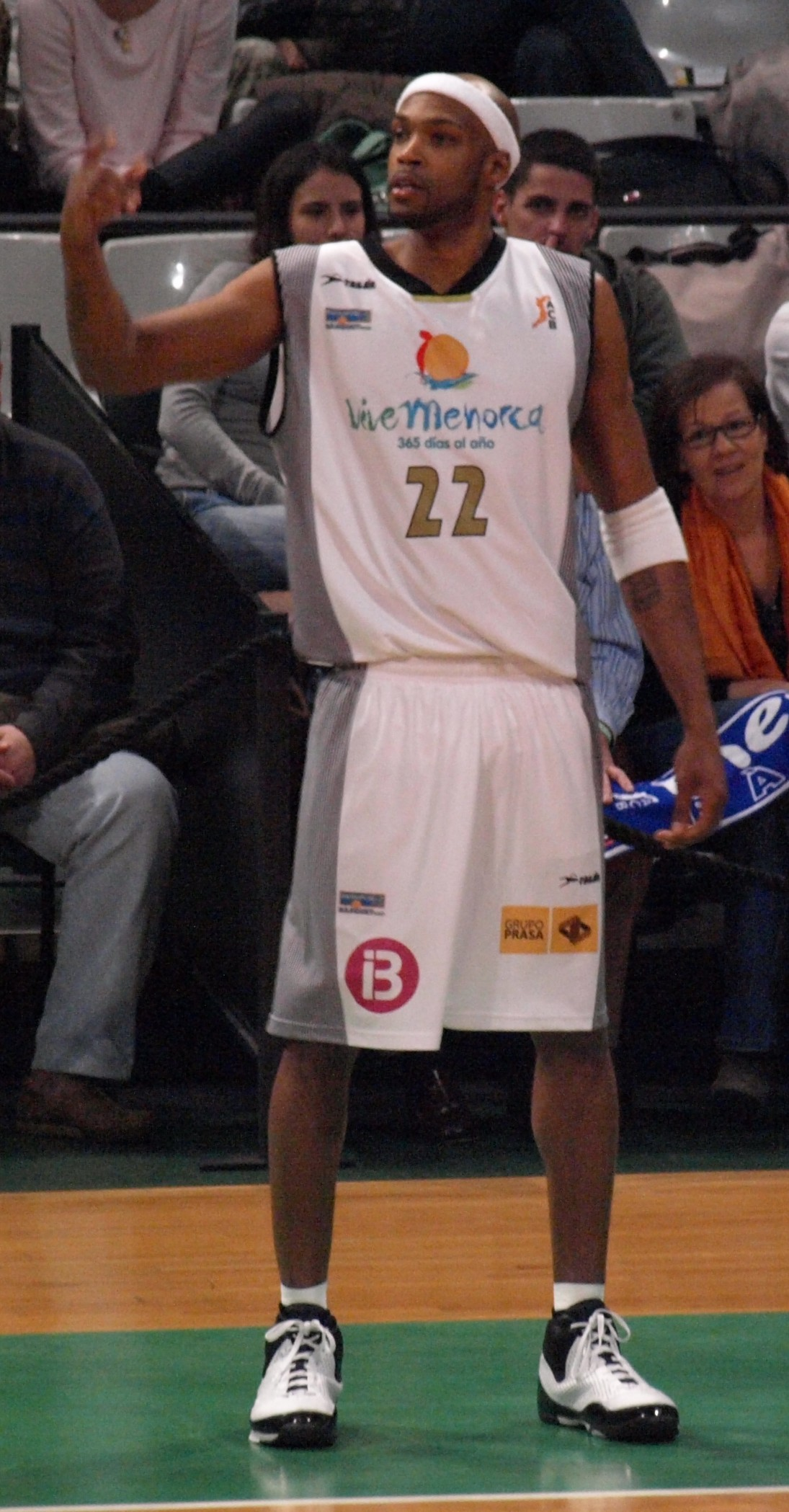
- Faison in 2009

Personal information
- Born: February 18, 1978 (age 48) Fayetteville, North Carolina, U.S.
- Listed height: 6 ft 5 in (1.96 m)
- Listed weight: 198 lb (90 kg)

Career information
- High school: Irvin (El Paso, Texas)
- College: Siena (1996–2000)
- NBA draft: 2000: undrafted
- Playing career: 2000–2015
- Position: Shooting guard / small forward

Career history
- 2000–2002: Go-Pass Pepinster
- 2002: Adirondack Wildcats
- 2002–2006: Spirou Charleroi
- 2006: RheinEnergie Köln
- 2006–2007: Unicaja Málaga
- 2007–2008: Kyiv
- 2008: Beşiktaş Cola Turka
- 2009: ViveMenorca
- 2009–2010: Peristeri
- 2010: Dnipro
- 2010–2011: Oostende
- 2011–2012: Verviers-Pepinster
- 2012: Kryvbasbasket
- 2012: Petron Blaze Boosters
- 2012: Armia Tbilisi
- 2013: Esteghlal Zarin Qeshm
- 2013: KTP-Basket
- 2014–2015: Sint-Niklase Condors

Career highlights
- 2× Belgian League MVP (2003, 2005); 2× Belgian League champion (2003, 2004); Belgian Cup winner (2003)

Marcus Vondell Faison (born February 18, 1978) is a Belgian-American former professional basketball player. He played Division I basketball for Siena College prior to his professional career. Was a prep standout at Irvin High School in El Paso, Texas.

== College career ==
Faison played for Siena College in Loudonville, New York from 1996 to 2000. As a four-year starter, he was the leading scorer on teams that reached three consecutive Metro Atlantic Athletic Conference (MAAC) championship games from 1997–2000. He appeared in one NCAA tournament game in 1999, scoring 18 points in a loss to the #4 seeded Arkansas Razorbacks. As a senior, he led Siena to a 24–9 record and an appearance in the National Invitation Tournament. He graduated in 2000 as Siena's third leading scorer in school history. He was named to the All-MAAC First Team three times and to the conference's 25th anniversary team in January 2006.

== Pro career ==
Faison joined Beşiktaş Cola Turka for the 2008–09 season. In January 2009, he left Beşiktaş because of economic problems and later signed with Peristeri in Greece.
