= Ed Stansbury =

American football player (born 1979)

No. 40
- Position: Fullback

Personal information
- Born: May 3, 1979 (age 47); El Paso, Texas, U.S.
- Listed height: 6 ft 2 in (1.88 m)
- Listed weight: 248 lb (112 kg)

Career information
- High school: Irvin (El Paso)
- College: UCLA
- NFL draft: 2002: undrafted

Career history
- Houston Texans (2002)
- Stats at Pro Football Reference

Edmund Elisala (Ieremia) Stansbury (born May 3, 1979) is an American former professional football fullback in the National Football League (NFL), and a prominent sports figure in El Paso, Texas. Stansbury had a standout athletic career at the high school, collegiate, and professional levels and has since made significant contributions to his community as an ambassador for sports.

== Early life ==
Stansbury attended Irvin High School in El Paso, Texas, where was a multi-sport athlete. He was a blue-chip, five-star recruit as a quarterback. In addition to his football success, Stansbury was an All-American discus thrower and a two-time Texas state champion in the event. Stansbury holds the 5th longest highschool throw in Texas State History in the discus at 206 ft.

== College career ==
At the University of California, Los Angeles (UCLA), Stansbury traveled to all games as a freshman and backup quarterback to Cade McNown. As a Junior, Stansbury transitioned to fullback and became a critical part of the Bruins’ offense. He was a two-year starter, serving as a key blocker for All-American running back Deshaun Foster and contributing as a short-yardage rusher and receiver.

One of his most memorable moments came during the 2000 season, when he scored the game-winning touchdown against the University of Michigan at the Rose Bowl Stadium.

In addition to football, Stansbury competed for the UCLA Track and Field Team from 1997 to 1999, specializing in the discus, shot put, and javelin. He placed 4th in the Pac-10 Championships in the discus in 1999 and was a member of the Pac-10 Championship team in 1998.

== Professional career ==
After going undrafted in the 2002 NFL draft, Stansbury signed with the Houston Texans during their inaugural season. He spent the year contributing to the team as a fullback and on special teams. In 2003, he signed a free-agent contract with the Seattle Seahawks before being allocated to NFL Europe in 2004.

With the Berlin Thunder of NFL Europe, Stansbury was the starting fullback for a team that won the World Bowl XII Championship.

== Post-football career ==
In 2015, he was inducted into the El Paso Athletic Hall of Fame in the Living Athlete category.

Stansbury has served as a sports commentator for KTSM 9 (NBC Affiliate)'s Overtime program for nine seasons and is the co-host of the Coldest Zone Podcast.

From 2015 to 2023, Stansbury was the Director of Operations for the Greater El Paso Football Showcase, an annual event highlighting the best high school football talent in the region. He also serves on the Board of Advisors for the Sun Bowl Association.

In 2024, Stansbury debuted as the Color Commentator for UTEP football on ESPN+ during Conference USA broadcasts, working alongside Andy Morgan on play-by-play.
