= Jefferson High School (El Paso, Texas) =

Public school in Texas, United States

Thomas Jefferson High School
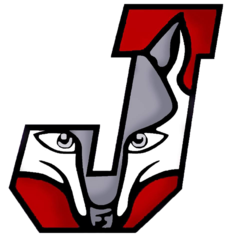

Location
- 4700 Alameda Avenue; El Paso, Texas 79905; United States
- Coordinates: 31.77045°N 106.4353°W

Information
- Type: Public
- Motto: "Viva la Jeff"!!
- Established: 1949
- Principal: Edgar Rincon
- Staff: 67.98 (FTE)
- Grades: 9–12
- Enrollment: 1,040 (2023–2024)
- Student to teacher ratio: 15.30
- Colors: Scarlet and silver
- Mascot: Silver Fox
- Website: www.episd.org/jefferson

Jefferson High School is a public high school located in South-Central El Paso, Texas, United States. It is part of the El Paso Independent School District and it serves mainly the eastern section of South-Central El Paso, generally from the Rio Grande north to Interstate 10 west of Raynolds Street and the railroad tracks running just north of El Paso Drive east of Raynolds, and from Luna and San Marcial Streets east to the Ysleta Independent School District boundary in the vicinity of Ascarate Park.

Jefferson High School is fed mainly by Henderson Middle, into which the elementary schools in its feeder pattern, Clardy, Cooley and Zavala, graduate. A four-by-ten-block area north of Interstate 10 surrounding the historic Concordia Cemetery and bordered by Interstate 10, the Patriot Freeway (US 54), Tularosa Avenue, and Estrella Street is also zoned to Jefferson for the high-school grades, to Henderson for the middle-school grades (six to eight), and to an unknown Elementary school for prekindergarten to fifth grade. The attendance zone north of Tularosa Avenue is zoned to Armendariz Middle and Austin High.

The history of Thomas Jefferson High in El Paso, Texas started before World War II when citizens in the vicinity of Burleson Elementary began to talk about the need for a secondary school. Little was done until after the war. In 1946, the educational facilities in El Paso were overcrowded. Spatial limitations were particularly evident at Bowie High School, El Paso High School, and Austin High School. These three establishments offered secondary education to students throughout the entire city. Many meetings and petitions led to the board’s decision to construct a new high school on the grounds of Burleson Elementary, 4700 Alameda Avenue, and surrounding property, which amounts to nearly seven and one-half acres. J.M. Whitaker was appointed principal of both Burleson Elementary School and Burleson High School. With the school board’s approval in 1948, Mr. Whitaker and the Parent Teacher Association decided to name the high school after Thomas Jefferson. In the process of ordering football and band uniforms, Mr. Whitaker and the Parent Teacher Association chose silver and scarlet as the school’s colors. On September 6, 1949, the school opened to hundreds of students for the first time. Many traditional activities were started in the initial years; the selection of a ROTC queen, the annual ball, a senior prom, the awarding of “J” sweaters, and other activities have become customary. With each passing year, Jefferson High School reminds us,

“Once a Fox-Always a Fox.”

== Athletics ==
Jefferson High School offers a variety of successful sports including:

Football

Soccer

Basketball

Baseball

Softball

Wrestling

Cross Country

Volleyball

Golf

In March 2012 Jefferson had its first state and national championships.

== Notable alumni ==
- Richard Ramirez, "The Night Stalker" serial killer
- Eddie Guerrero, professional wrestler
- Alberto Almanza Mexico Olympic basketball Player 1960, 1964
