= Mountain View, El Paso, Texas =

Mountain View
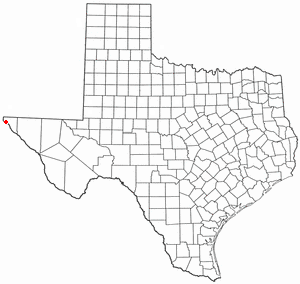
- Location in the state of Texas
- Coordinates: 31.862°N 106.420°W
- Country: United States
- State: Texas
- County: El Paso County
- City: El Paso
- Elevation: 3,600 ft (1,100 m)
- Time zone: UTC-6 (MDT)
  - Summer (DST): UTC-6 (CDT)

Mountain View is a neighborhood in Northeast El Paso, in the city of El Paso, Texas. Its boundaries are commonly considered to be Dyer Street on the west, Railroad Drive on the east, Hondo Pass Avenue on the north, and on the south, Hercules Avenue and the intersection of Diana Drive and Railroad Drive; this includes the city-designated neighborhoods of Las Sierras and Restlawn (around the cemetery by that name) as well as Mountain View North and South, which lie east of Diana Drive.

Mountain View was built beginning in the early 1950s and is a moderate-income area dominated by aging single-family homes, mainly of stucco or brick, which has long been home to many active-duty soldiers stationed at Fort Bliss and retired Army personnel. Besides the large, privately owned Restlawn Cemetery on Dyer Street at Alps Drive, Mountain View also has a county pauper's cemetery, the MacGill Cemetery, located at the northern end of Pandora Street next to Magoffin Middle School and Mountain View Park; Nations Tobin Park, a large regional city park, is in the northeastern part of Mountain View on Railroad Drive. Businesses in the neighborhood are mostly found along its edges, on Dyer Street, Hondo Pass Avenue, and Railroad Drive, as well as on Hercules Avenue between Dyer and Diana; there is a large older shopping center, Sunrise Center, on Dyer Street at Tetons Drive, once known for its distinctive tall blue spire lit from within.

There is an annual Easter parade, the NorthEastern Parade, along Diana Drive beginning at Hercules Avenue and proceeding north as far as Dyer Street.

Many of the streets in Mountain View are named for mountains or mountain ranges (Mount Everest, Mount Whitney, Mount Hood, Andes, Alps), except for the streets in the southeast corner, many of which are named for Army bases (Riley, Bragg, Benning).

== Schools ==
Mountain View is located in the El Paso Independent School District and is zoned to Irvin High School and Magoffin Middle School, which is located at the center of the neighborhood. Lafarelle Alternative Middle School, El Paso Independent School District's disciplinary campus for sixth to eighth-graders, is in Mountain View also, several blocks east of Magoffin on Hercules Avenue. Moye Elementary School is also located in the neighborhood, on Alps Drive across from Restlawn Cemetery, but does not serve Mountain View; rather, its attendance area consists of most of the adjacent Angel's Triangle neighborhood and part of Park Foothills further east. Stanton Elementary School is located on Hondo Pass Avenue on Mountain View's northern edge, and the portion of Mountain View east of Diana Drive is zoned to Stanton for prekindergarten to fifth grade, while Mountain View west of Diana Drive, including the immediate vicinity of Moye Elementary, is zoned to Lee Elementary School. Blessed Sacrament Catholic Church on Diana Drive just south of Hondo Pass Avenue once had an attached primary school, which is now closed.

== History ==
Mountain View plat was filed by Charles H. Foster through 1953–54.
