= Telles Academy =

Raymond Telles Academy

Location
- 2851 Grant Ave, Bldg A El Paso, Texas 79930; United States
- Coordinates: 31.7892°N 106.4521°W

Information
- School district: El Paso Independent School District
- NCES School ID: 481830006945
- Grades: 6–12
- Enrollment: ~26–45 students
- Student to teacher ratio: 3.25:1
- Campus type: Alternative
- Colors: White and Teal
- Mascot: Turtle
- Nickname: Telles Academy
- Website: www.episd.org/o/tea

Raymond Telles Academy is a public alternative high school and middle school located in El Paso, Texas. It is part of the El Paso Independent School District (EPISD) and serves students in grades 6 through 12. The school is named in honor of Raymond Telles, the first Mexican-American mayor of El Paso and the first Hispanic U.S. Ambassador.

== History and Namesake ==
The academy was established to provide a specialized learning environment for students within the EPISD. It bears the name of Raymond Telles (1915–2013), a pivotal figure in El Paso history who broke racial barriers in local and federal government, as the first Hispanic US ambassador and first Hispanic mayor of El Paso. The Telles Academy is currently housed at the former site of Houston Elementary School, on Grant Avenue.

== Academics and Mission ==
Telles Academy functions as a non-traditional campus focused on credit recovery, personalized instruction, and social-emotional support.

The academy is characterized by its exceptionally small class sizes. As of the 2023–2024 academic year, reports indicated a student-to-teacher ratio as low as 3.25:1, significantly lower than the Texas state average.

The Telles Academy offers alternative education with individualized, self-paced learning. The academy assesses students upfront to build personal portfolios, which are then used to create a customized learning for each individual. Using these tailored plans can focus on intense, personalized instruction. Additionally, the program incorporates the fine arts into its curriculum, giving students the opportunity to attend plays and operas for a more well-rounded educational experience.

== Demographics ==
The school serves a diverse student body, with a high percentage of minority enrollment. According to data from the Texas Tribune, the student population is predominantly Hispanic, and a large majority of the students are classified as economically disadvantaged.

== See also ==
- List of high schools in Texas
