= Paul Smith (fullback) =

American football player (born 1978)

No. 27, 40, 31, 26
- Position: Fullback

Personal information
- Born: January 31, 1978 (age 48); El Paso, Texas, U.S.
- Listed height: 5 ft 11 in (1.80 m)
- Listed weight: 242 lb (110 kg)

Career information
- High school: Andress (El Paso)
- College: UTEP (1996–1999)
- NFL draft: 2000: 5th round, 132nd overall pick

Career history
- San Francisco 49ers (2000–2002); Detroit Lions (2003–2005); St. Louis Rams (2006); Denver Broncos (2007)

Career NFL statistics
- Rushing attempts: 46
- Rushing yards: 210
- Rushing touchdowns: 1
- Receptions: 18
- Receiving yards: 182
- Stats at Pro Football Reference

Paul Albert Smith III (born January 31, 1978) is an American former professional football player. He was selected in the fifth round of the 2000 NFL draft with the 132nd overall pick. He currently owns Get Lifted CrossFit in El Paso, Texas.

== Early life ==
Smith attended Andress high school in El Paso, Texas and was a student and a letterman in football. In football, he was an El Paso All-Star selection and an All-District selection.
