= Maxine L. Silva Magnet High School for Health Care Professions =

Location
- 121 Val Verde Street; El Paso, Texas 79905; United States; 31.769036°N 106.433213°W

Information
- Type: Public
- Established: 1993
- Principal: Edgar Rincon
- Staff: 39.74 (FTE)
- Grades: 9-12
- Enrollment: 721 (2017–18)
- Student to teacher ratio: 18.14
- Colors: Scarlet and Silver
- Mascot: Silver Fox
- Website: www.episd.org/o/smhs

Silva Magnet High School is a health-focused magnet high school within the El Paso Independent School District in El Paso, Texas.

It is named after lifelong El Pasoan Maxine L. Silva, who once represented the area in which the school is located on the El Paso Independent School District board of trustees.

== Campus ==
Silva Magnet High School is a three-story, one-building campus located on the grounds of Jefferson High School in south-central El Paso.

The University Medical Center (formerly Thomason General Hospital) and the Texas Tech University Health Science Center are located directly across the street from Silva. Students from middle schools throughout the county apply for admission to the high school during 8th grade, leading to a diverse body of students from different cultural and socioeconomic backgrounds from throughout El Paso County.

== School within a School ==
Ms. Charmine Deremeir was the first administrator (1993–1994) of the El Paso Magnet High School for the Health Care Professions, now known as the Maxine Silva Magnet High School for the Health Care Professions. She was instrumental in assuring the placement of the Health Magnet High School and working closely with the first group of students (Class of 1997) and their parents in determining what needed to be done to ensure that Silva would be seen as a model school.

== School prestige ==
Among El Paso schools (private and public), Silva Magnet High School has consistently ranked academically at or near the top in various categories. In 2006, Newsweek magazine ranked Silva Magnet High School as one of the top 1000 schools in the U.S. and was rated the highest of schools in El Paso on the list.

In 2003, 2011, and 2017 Silva received the Blue Ribbon Schools Award.
