= Albert Almanza =

Mexican basketball player (1936–2023)

Personal information
- Born: 3 January 1940 Chihuahua City, Mexico
- Died: 27 January 2023 (aged 86) Austin, Texas, U.S.
- Listed height: 6 ft 8 in (2.03 m)
- Listed weight: 200 lb (91 kg)

Career information
- High school: Jefferson (El Paso, Texas)
- College: Texas (1958–1961)
- NBA draft: 1961: 7th round, 63rd overall pick
- Drafted by: Los Angeles Lakers
- Position: Center
- Stats at Basketball Reference

Albert "Chorrito" Almanza González (3 January 1940 – 27 January 2023) was a Mexican Olympic athlete and college basketball player for The University of Texas at Austin.

Almanza came to the United States from Mexico in 1954 and began attending Jefferson High School in El Paso, Texas that year. Almanza was a three-year starter for the Texas Longhorns men's basketball team from 1958 to 1961 under head coaches Marshall Hughes (1958–59) and Harold Bradley (1959–61). He led the 1958–59 and 1960–61 Texas teams in rebounding, with season averages of 8.0 and 9.2 rebounds per game, respectively. Almanza was also second in scoring on the 1958–59 team with an average of 11.0 points per game, fourth in scoring in 1959–60 with an average of 10.8 points per game, and second in scoring in 1960–61 with an average of 14.0 points per game. With Almanza as starting power forward, the 1959–60 Longhorn team finished with an overall record of 18–8, won the Southwest Conference championship, and competed in the Sweet 16 game of the 1960 NCAA Tournament.

Almanza competed for Mexico on the Mexico national basketball team in the Olympics of 1960 and 1964. He served as team co-captain in 1960 and led the team in scoring with an average of 19.8 points per game; he returned in 1964 to lead the Mexico national team in scoring for a second time with an average of 14.7 points per game. Mexico placed twelfth in basketball in both Olympics.

Almanza was selected with the fourth pick of the seventh round of the 1961 NBA draft (63rd overall pick) by the Los Angeles Lakers. He retired after 35 years of employment with New York Life.
