= Billy Davis (wide receiver) =

American football player (born 1972)

No. 87, 86
- Position: Wide receiver

Personal information
- Born: July 6, 1972 (age 54); El Paso, Texas, U.S.
- Listed height: 6 ft 1 in (1.85 m)
- Listed weight: 205 lb (93 kg)

Career information
- High school: Irvin (El Paso)
- College: Pittsburgh
- NFL draft: 1995: undrafted

Career history
- Dallas Cowboys (1995–1998); Baltimore Ravens (1999–2000); Chicago Bears (2001)*; Oakland Raiders (2002)*
- * Offseason or practice squad member only

Awards and highlights
- 2× Super Bowl champion (XXX, XXXV)

Career NFL statistics
- Games played: 93
- Receptions: 51
- Receiving yards: 907
- Touchdowns: 3
- Stats at Pro Football Reference

William Augusta Davis III (born July 6, 1972) is an American former professional football player who was a wide receiver for the Dallas Cowboys and Baltimore Ravens. He played college football for the Pittsburgh Panthers.

== Early life ==
Davis attended Irvin High School, where he played as a quarterback, defensive back and punter. As a senior, he passed for 1,200 yards, receiving All-district, All-city and All-region honors. In track, he competed in the pole vault, 100 metres and 200 metres, receiving All-district and All-city honors.

He accepted a football scholarship from the University of Pittsburgh. As a freshman, he was converted into a wide receiver, posting 11 receptions for 100 yards. As a sophomore, he collected 34 receptions for 503 yards (14.8-yard average) and 3 touchdowns.

As a junior, he started 9 out of 11 games, registering 24 receptions for 346 yards (14.4-yard average) with one touchdown.

As a senior, he led the team with 51 receptions for 731 yards (14.3-yard average) and 9 touchdowns. He tied a school record with 4 touchdown receptions in a game, to help upset Rutgers University, while also making 10 receptions for 135 yards.

He finished with 120 receptions (third in school history) for 1,680 yards (fifth in school history) and 13 touchdowns.

== Professional career ==
=== Dallas Cowboys ===
Davis was signed as an undrafted free agent by the Dallas Cowboys after the 1995 NFL draft. He made the roster based on his special teams play. He recorded 16 special teams tackles (fifth on the team) and was a part of the Super Bowl XXX winning team.

In 1996, he missed 3 games with a broken fifth metatarsal in his right foot. He made 17 special teams tackles (tied for third on the team).

In 1997, he finished third on the team with 20 special teams tackles. As a wide receiver, he was mostly a reserve player that was known to have excellent training camps where he showed his explosiveness and size advantages, but it didn't transfer to the regular season.

In 1998 with the arrival of new head coach Chan Gailey, he was named the starter opposite to future hall of famer Michael Irvin and proceeded to have 39 receptions for 691 yards (17.7-yard average) and 3 touchdowns. He also had 11 special teams tackles.

On May 31, 1999, he was waived for salary-cap reasons after the signing of free agent Raghib Ismail.

=== Baltimore Ravens ===
In 1999, he struggled while playing on offense, but it didn't affect his special teams play, finishing with a career-best 21 tackles. The next year, he finished fourth on the team with 15 special teams tackles and was a part of the Super Bowl XXXV winning side. He was released for salary cap reasons on March 19, 2001.

=== Chicago Bears ===
On August 30, 2001, he signed as a free agent with the Chicago Bears, who were looking to replace an injured Frankie Smith. He was cut on September first.

=== Oakland Raiders ===
On May 30, 2002, Davis signed as a free agent with the Oakland Raiders. He was waived on August 26.
