= West central El Paso =

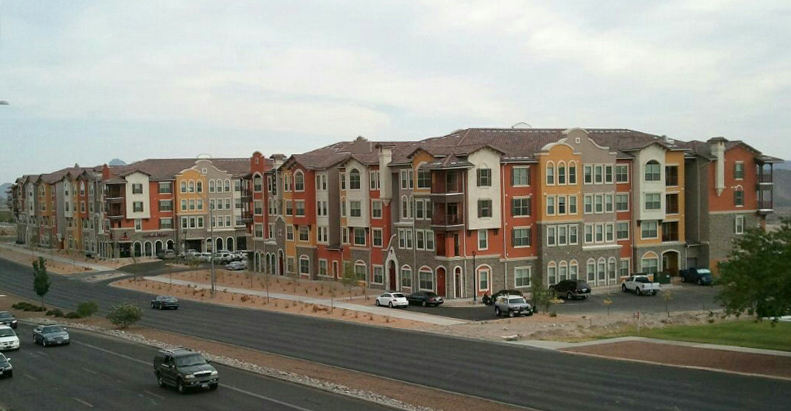
Montecillo master-planned community

West central El Paso is part of the city of El Paso, Texas, USA. The area is located north of Interstate 10 and west of the Franklin Mountains. The University of Texas at El Paso is located in the heart of the area. It is part of the El Paso Independent School District.

== Neighborhoods ==
Here is a list of some of the neighborhoods in west central El Paso:

- Buena Vista
- Courchesne
- Crazy Cat Mountain
- Franklin Heights
- Kern Place
- La Guna
- Mission Hills
- Summit Place
- Sunset Heights

== Neighborhood associations ==
Here is a list of some of the neighborhood associations in west central El Paso:

- El Paso High Neighborhood Association
- Houston Park Neighborhood Association
- Mission Hills Neighborhood Association
- Rim Area Neighborhood Association
- Sunset Heights Neighborhood Improvement Association
