= Brian Young (American football, born 1977) =

American football player and coach (born 1977)

New Orleans Saints
- Title: Pass rush specialist

Personal information
- Born: July 8, 1977 (age 49); Lawton, Oklahoma, U.S.
- Listed height: 6 ft 2 in (1.88 m)
- Listed weight: 298 lb (135 kg)

Career information
- Position: Defensive tackle (No. 66)
- High school: El Paso (TX) Andress
- College: UTEP (1996–1999)
- NFL draft: 2000: 5th round, 139th overall pick

Career history

Playing
- St. Louis Rams (2000–2003); New Orleans Saints (2004–2008)

Coaching
- New Orleans Saints (2009–present); Coaching intern (2009–2010); Defensive assistant (2011–2012); Defensive assistant/linebackers (2013); Assistant linebackers (2014); Outside linebackers (2015); Pass rush specialist (2016–2024); Assistant defensive line (2025–present)

Awards and highlights
- Super Bowl champion (XLIV); WAC Defensive Player of the Year (1999); 2× First-team All-WAC (1998, 1999)

Career NFL statistics
- Total tackles: 309
- Sacks: 22.5
- Forced fumbles: 7
- Fumble recoveries: 8
- Interceptions: 1
- Stats at Pro Football Reference

Brian Young (born July 8, 1977) is an American football coach and former player who is a defensive coach for the New Orleans Saints of the National Football League (NFL). Young played college football for the University of Texas at El Paso, and professionally for the St. Louis Rams and New Orleans Saints of the NFL.

== Early life ==
Young earned varsity letters in high school football and track and field track at Andress High School in El Paso, Texas. As a senior, he received all-district and all-city honors, and an honorable mention all-state selection in football.

== College career ==
In 1996, while playing as a true freshman, Young finished his freshman year season with 13 tackles (3 for a loss) and 1.5 sacks. As a sophomore in 1997, Young finished his sophomore year season with 45 tackles, 7 for a loss, and 3 sacks. As a junior in 1998 Young was named All-WAC and had totaled 72 tackles (8 for a loss) and 3.5 sacks. As a senior in 1999 at UTEP, Young was named the Western Athletic Conference WAC Defensive Player of the Year for an 84-Tackle (football move)|tackle (16 for loss) and 8- Quarterback sack|sack season for the UTEP Miners football Miners. He ended his college career at UTEP with a total of 214 tackles (34 for losses) and 16 sacks.

== Professional playing career ==
=== Pre-draft ===
Pre-draft measurables
Height	Weight	Arm length	Hand span	40-yard dash	10-yard split	20-yard split	20-yard shuttle	Three-cone drill	Vertical jump	Broad jump	Bench press
6 ft 2 3/8 in (1.89 m)	278 lb (126 kg)	31 1/2 in (0.80 m)	10 in (0.25 m)	4.90 s	1.67 s	2.80 s	4.47 s	7.20 s	29.5 in (0.75 m)	8 ft 10 in (2.69 m)	27 reps
All values from NFL Combine

Young was the strongest player in the UTEP football program, with a 435-pound bench press and a 675-pound squat.

=== St. Louis Rams ===
Young was selected in the fifth round of the 2000 NFL draft by the St. Louis Rams. On July 6, 2000, he signed a 3-year contract worth $950,000. As a rookie, he played in 11 games and made six tackles. The following year, he became a starter for the Rams, he recorded 40 tackles and 6.5 sacks and intercepted a pass for the NFC Champions. In 2002, he played in all 16 games with 2 starts at defensive tackle and 1 start at left defensive end. For the season he had 36 tackles and 2 sacks.

As a restricted free agent after the 2002 season, Young signed a one-year tender from the Rams for $610,000. In 2003, he nearly duplicated his 2002 statistics by recording 38 tackles and 2 sacks but in 2003 he had five fumble recoveries. On November 9, 2003, Young tied an NFL record with three fumble recoveries against the Baltimore Ravens and was named the NFC Defensive Player of the Week. Young became 15th player in NFL history to recover three fumbles in a game. He also had a career-high 11 tackles, a sack, one quarterback pressure and a forced fumble in the Rams' 33–22 win.

=== New Orleans Saints ===
On March 11, 2004, Young signed a four-year, $10 million free-agent contract with the New Orleans Saints. As a starter for the Saints in 2004 Young had 59 tackles and 2.5 sacks. In 2005, he had 51 tackles but failed to record a sack.

In 2006 the Saints were the NFL's Cinderella story and Young contributed 46 tackles and 5.5 sacks. In 2007 Young had a pneumonia-shortened year, playing in only 9 games but still he recorded 3 sacks and 18 tackles.

On February 29, 2008, the Saints re-signed DT Brian Young to a three-year, $12 million contract. Following a second straight season in which he was placed on injured reserve, he was released on April 28, 2009.

== NFL career statistics ==
Legend
**Bold**	Career high

=== Regular season ===
Year	Team	Games		Tackles					Interceptions					Fumbles			
Year	Team	GP	GS	Cmb	Solo	Ast	Sck	TFL	Int	Yds	TD	Lng	PD	FF	FR	Yds	TD
2000	STL	11	0	10	6	4	0.0	1	0	0	0	0	0	0	0	0	0
2001	STL	**16**	**16**	40	33	7	**6.5**	**10**	**1**	**25**	0	**25**	**3**	1	0	0	0
2002	STL	**16**	3	36	26	10	2.0	3	0	0	0	0	2	0	1	0	0
2003	STL	**16**	12	36	25	11	2.0	2	0	0	0	0	2	**4**	**5**	**21**	0
2004	NOR	15	15	**59**	**40**	**19**	2.5	7	0	0	0	0	0	0	1	0	0
2005	NOR	**16**	**16**	51	38	13	0.0	3	0	0	0	0	0	0	0	0	0
2006	NOR	**16**	**16**	46	35	11	5.5	8	0	0	0	0	1	0	1	0	0
2007	NOR	9	8	18	16	2	3.0	1	0	0	0	0	1	1	0	0	0
2008	NOR	8	3	13	11	2	1.0	1	0	0	0	0	0	1	0	0	0
		123	89	309	230	79	22.5	36	1	25	0	25	9	7	8	21	0

=== Playoffs ===
Year	Team	Games		Tackles					Interceptions					Fumbles			
Year	Team	GP	GS	Cmb	Solo	Ast	Sck	TFL	Int	Yds	TD	Lng	PD	FF	FR	Yds	TD
2001	STL	**3**	**3**	6	5	**1**	0.0	1	0	0	0	0	**1**	0	**2**	0	0
2003	STL	1	1	4	4	0	**2.0**	**2**	0	0	0	0	0	0	0	0	0
2006	NOR	2	2	**8**	**7**	**1**	0.0	1	0	0	0	0	0	0	0	0	0
		6	6	18	16	2	2.0	4	0	0	0	0	1	0	2	0	0

== Coaching career ==
On July 10, 2009, KTSM-TV, also known as NewsChannel 9, the NBC affiliate based in El Paso, Texas reported that he had retired from the NFL due to his injuries and was considering going into coaching.

Though knee injuries ended Brian Young's playing career after nine seasons. He spent the 2009 and 2010 season with the Saints as an unpaid assistant coach intern.

As of 2011, Young had become a paid defensive coach for the Saints.

- Brian Young's passion remains: Ex-UTEP Miner at peace with end of pro career
