= Daniel Amigo =

American-Argentine-Mexican basketball player

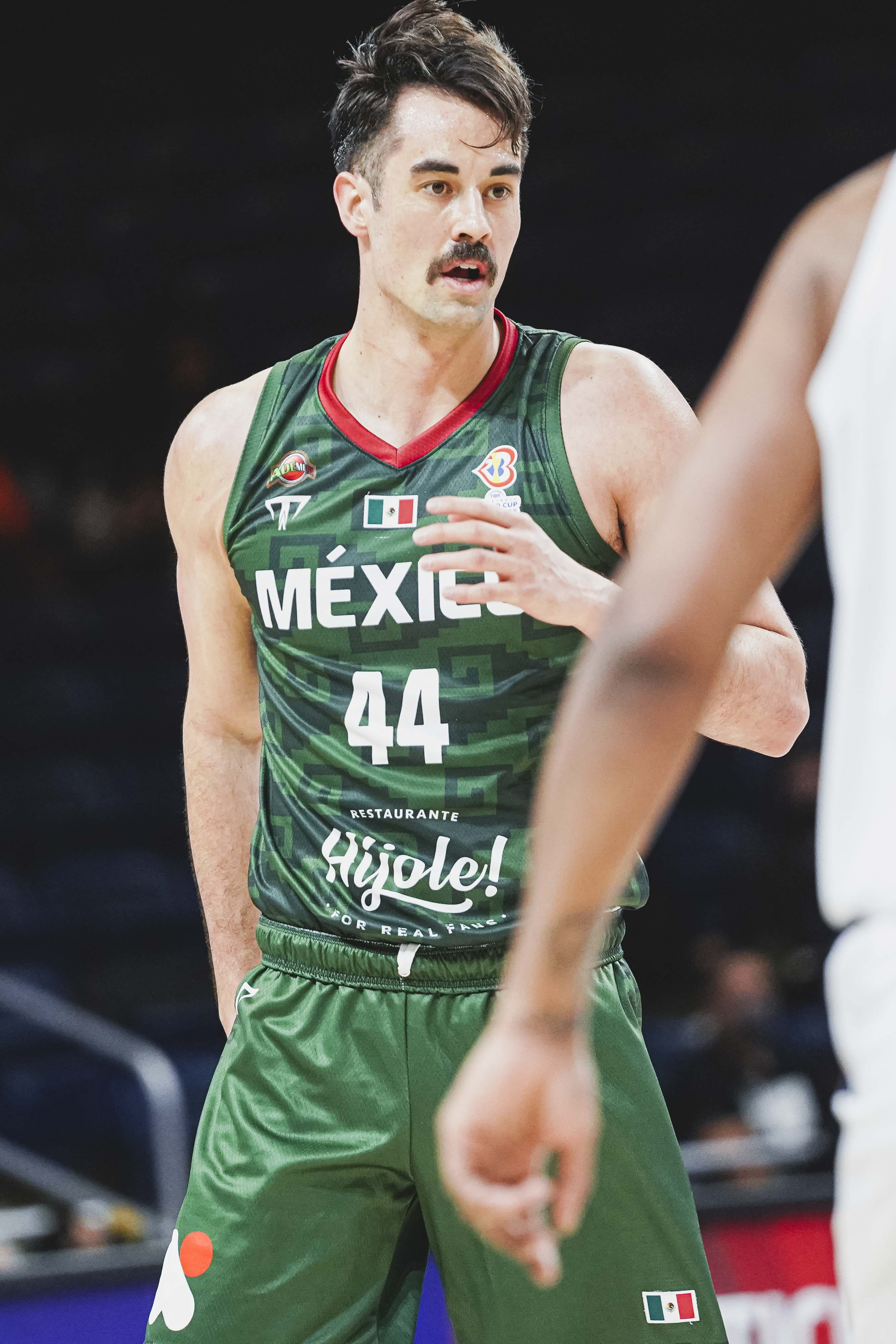
- Amigo with the Mexico national team in 2022

Personal information
- Born: September 13, 1995 (age 31) El Paso, Texas, U.S.
- Listed height: 6 ft 10 in (2.08 m)
- Listed weight: 245 lb (111 kg)

Career information
- High school: Coronado (El Paso, Texas)
- College: Denver (2014–2018)
- NBA draft: 2018: undrafted
- Playing career: 2018–present
- Position: Center

Career history
- 2018–2019: Debreceni EAC
- 2019–2020: Soles de Mexicali
- 2020–2021: BC Pieno žvaigždės
- 2021: Soles de Mexicali
- 2021–2022: Polski Cukier Toruń
- 2022: Grises de Humacao
- 2022: Libertadores de Querétaro
- 2026: Astros de Jalisco

Career highlights
- 2× Second-team All-Summit League (2017, 2018)

Daniel Amigo (born September 13, 1995) is a Mexican-American-Argentine professional basketball player for Astros de Jalisco of the CIBACOPA. He played college basketball for the Denver Pioneers. He plays for the Mexico men's national basketball team.

== High school career ==
Amigo attended Coronado High School. As a senior, he averaged 20 points and 10 rebounds per game. He committed to Denver.

== College career ==
As a freshman at Denver, Amigo averaged 6.1 points and 1.5 rebounds per game. He averaged 2.1 points and 1.3 rebounds per game as a sophomore. Following the season, Rodney Billups was hired as head coach, and Amigo sharply increased his production during his junior season. He averaged 15.5 points and 7.1 rebounds per game as a junior, earning Second Team All-Summit League honors. As a senior, Amigo averaged 15.3 points and 6.6 rebounds per game, shooting 52 percent from the field. He was named to the Second Team All-Summit League.

== Professional career ==
In June 2018, Amigo signed with Debreceni EAC of the NB I/A. On August 17, 2019, he signed with the Soles de Mexicali of the Liga Nacional de Baloncesto Profesional. In June 2020, Amigo signed with BC Pieno žvaigždės of the Lithuanian league. He averaged 10 points, 4.5 rebounds, and 1.3 assists per game. On July 6, 2021, Amigo returned to the Soles de Mexicali. He averaged 10.5 points, 4 rebounds and 1.8 assists per game. On November 29, Amigo signed with Polski Cukier Toruń of the Polish Basketball League.

== National team career ==
Amigo has represented Mexico and Argentina in international competitions, as he has an Argentine father and Mexican mother. He participated in the 2017 FIBA AmeriCup for Argentina, at the request of Sergio Hernández. Amigo helped Mexico reach the semifinal round of the qualifying tournament for the 2020 Summer Olympics.
