= Coronado High School (El Paso, Texas) =

Location
- 100 Champions Place; El Paso, Texas 79912; United States; 31.8364°N 106.5462°W

Information
- Type: Public
- Motto: Pride of the West Side
- Established: 1962
- School district: El Paso Independent School District
- Principal: Marc Escareno
- Faculty: 138.66 (on FTE basis)
- Grades: 9-12
- Enrollment: 2,349 (2023–24)
- Student to teacher ratio: 17.24
- Campus type: Urban
- Colors: Navy, white, and gold
- Athletics conference: 1-6A
- Mascot: Thunderbird
- Nickname: T-Birds
- Affiliations: International Baccalaureate
- Website: www.episd.org/o/cohs

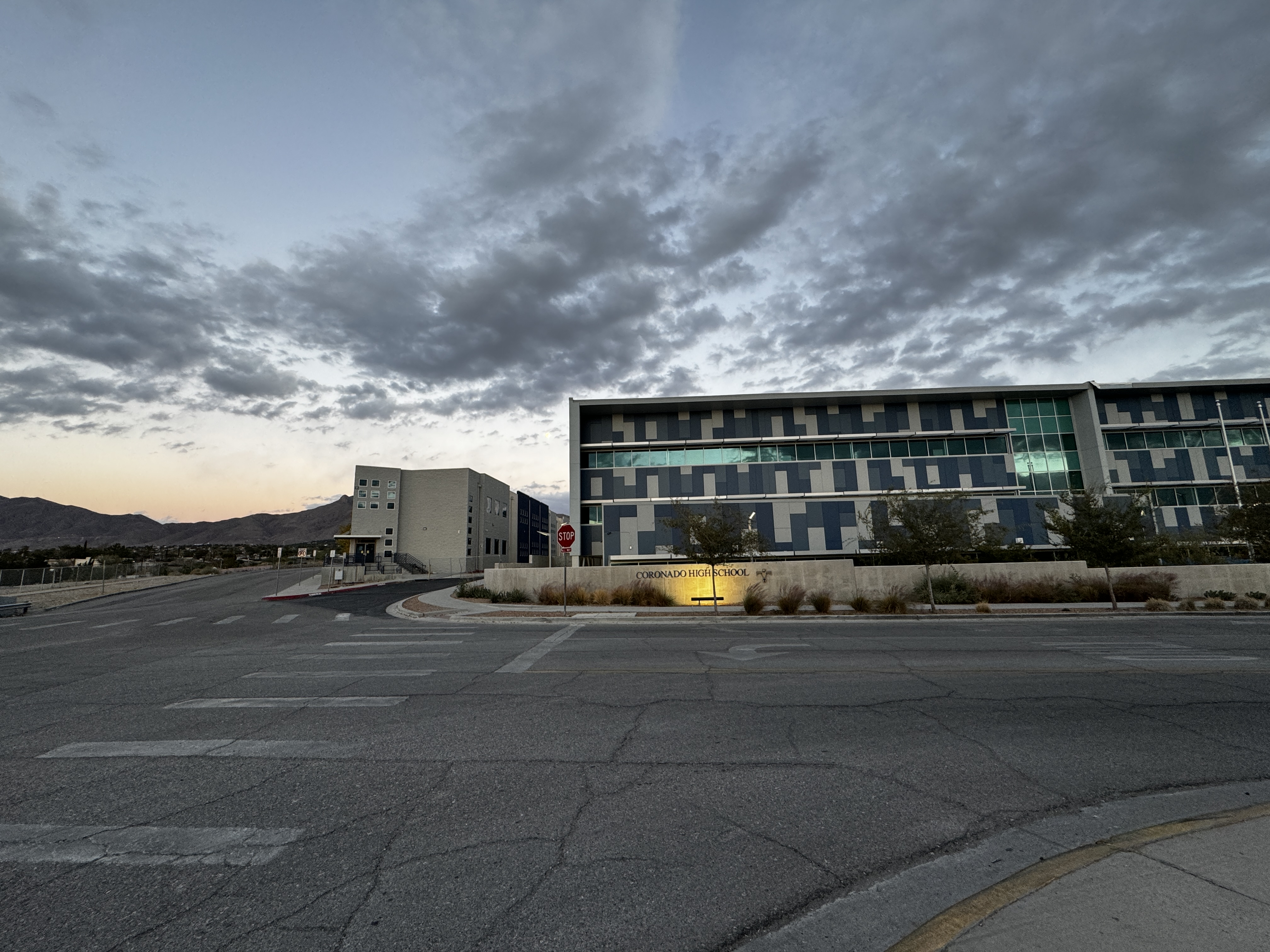
Champions Pl as front school on E Building (left) and A and B as main Building (right)

Coronado High School in El Paso, Texas, United States is located on the west side of El Paso near the intersection of North Mesa Street and Resler Drive. It serves the southern part of west El Paso: east of Interstate 10, from the vicinity of Executive Center Boulevard north approximately three miles to around Coronado Arroyo, a normally dry stream bed running west down from the Franklin Mountains just north of Escondido Drive; and the portion of the Upper Valley (the part of El Paso County beside the Rio Grande west of Interstate 10) which lies south of Country Club Road. Most of the Coronado attendance zone is zoned to Morehead Middle School for grades six to eight. The elementary schools in the Coronado feeder pattern include Green, L.B Johnson, Putnam, Carlos Rivera, Western Hills, and Zach White. The Upper Valley portion of the Coronado attendance area is zoned to Zach White Elementary and Lincoln Middle School, except for the Buena Vista neighborhood around Interstate 10 and West Paisano Drive, which is zoned to Johnson and Morehead. Green, L.B Johnson, Putnam, Carlos Rivera and Western Hills elementary schools all graduate into Morehead Middle School.

Notes for the high school feeder zone have schools name changed. Since EPISD 2016, Bond passed for the school consolidated for the following: Don Haskins PK-8 served in the Upper Valley, known as former Abraham Lincoln Middle School. There are two elementary schools for Oran Robert Elementary School, and Mitzi Bond Elementary School is closed. Charles Q Murphree PK-8 served in the Westside El Paso across Mesa Street, known as former Morehead Middle School. There is one elementary school for LB Johnson Elementary school is closed.

Coronado High is named for Spanish conquistador Francisco Vázquez de Coronado, whose expeditions in what is now the southwestern United States took him through what is now El Paso.

== Identity ==
Coronado High's mascot, inspired by a natural silhouette on its Franklin Mountain backdrop, is the Thunderbird, shortened to T-Bird, and its slogan is "The Pride of the West Side," showing the students gratification and self-esteem for their school. Coronado's school colors are Navy blue, white, and Las Vegas gold.

== Academics ==
The mission of Coronado High School is to advance the academic, artistic, emotional, physical, and social education of every student in order to develop productive members of society.

Coronado High School has offered the International Baccalaureate Diploma Programme since 2000. Students who are accepted into the program take a series of examinations at the end of a four-year curriculum.

== Campus ==
Coronado's major renovation has been completed, with the original A and B buildings having been torn down to make a massive new 3 story building, which was completed in Spring of 2023.

The renovation also includes a new athletic field house which has the football team, baseball team, softball team, boys and girls soccer teams, boys and girls tennis teams and trainers. The Cafeteria, C building, Main and Auxiliary gyms, D building, E building, Agricultural building and Fine Arts still remain.

The new fine arts building, the Lee Ross Capshaw Auditorium, is named after the father of retired orchestra director Ida Steadman and retired band director Kenneth Capshaw; Lee was also a retired EPISD music administrator.

The school also has the Jack Quarles and Don Brooks Thunderbird Stadium, baseball and softball fields, tennis courts, cafeteria, Agricultural Building, and the Big Gym (renovated in 2009) and Small Gym. To the south of the Small Gym are about six portables that also provide classes. The administrative office is located in A Building, just beyond the main entrance to the school.

== Band ==
The Thunderbird Marching Band and Symphonic Ensembles are one of only fourteen high school bands in the world to have received both the Sudler Flag of Honor (For Consistent High Excellence in Concert events) and the Sudler Shield (For Consistent High Excellence in Marching events), the two most prestigious honors bestowed upon a high school band ensemble. In 2012, the band received the Exemplary Band Program Award from the Texas Bandmasters Association.

The Coronado High School Marching Band has won the "Grand Champion" ranking (out of the 32 bands from Texas, California, New Mexico, Arizona, and Colorado) at the New Mexico Tournament of Bands competition more times than any other organization in the history of the 38-year competition.

They have also competed numerous times at the Texas UIL State Marching Contest, nationally at many Bands of America regional and super-regional marching contests, and internationally at various concert events. The band has visited Chihuahua, Moscow, Vienna, Hawaii, Dallas, Toronto, San Antonio, Houston, San Diego, San Francisco, Los Angeles, Las Vegas, Albuquerque, Orlando, and New York City.

The Coronado Jazz Bands boast consistent division one ratings at local and state jazz clinics and contests, with the top Jazz Band winning 1st place at the Hanks Jazz contest numerous times.

The Coronado Wind Ensemble is the only high school wind ensemble in El Paso and West Texas to advance to state as a 5A Texas Honor Band, having been in the ranks five times in TMEA history.

== Orchestra ==
The Coronado High School Orchestra is nationally ranked. In 1988, 1998, 2002, 2007, and 2015 the Coronado symphony orchestra performed at Carnegie Hall in New York City. The orchestra has traveled to various locations around the world to perform, including Italy, Japan, England, Mexico, Austria, and the Czech Republic. The Coronado Orchestra has been selected Honor Orchestra by the Texas Music Educators Association (TMEA) three times, and has performed at the Midwest International Band and Orchestra Clinic twice. The Coronado Orchestra won first place in 1984 and second and third place in 2000 at the prestigious Youth and Music Festival in Vienna.

== Athletics ==
Coronado has a wide range of athletic teams, including swimming, baseball, football, tennis, golf, track and field, cross country, softball, basketball, wrestling, and soccer

Coronado tennis teams won the UIL 5A State Tennis Team title in both 1990 and 2000; the UIL 5A State Girls' Doubles Tournament in 2001 and 2003; the State Girls' Singles in 1987 and 1993; the State Boys' Doubles in 2003; and the Boys' Singles in 1991, 1992, and 2015.

The men's soccer team won a state championship in 1996.

The men's golf team won the Texas State 5A Championship in 1992.

== MCJROTC ==
Coronado High School has the only Marine Corps JROTC program in West Texas and Southern New Mexico. It was added to Coronado High School in 2016 as the original JROTC program at Coronado had been eliminated in the early 1980s. The JROTC program will be housed in the original stadium classrooms beginning in August 2020.

== Notable alumni ==
- Daniel Amigo - professional basketball player
- Jerry Bailey - professional jockey
- Cedric Bixler-Zavala - member of the band The Mars Volta
- Emilio M. Bruna, PhD - Distinguished Teaching Scholar at the University of Florida and Editor-in-Chief of the scientific journal Biotropica.
- Rocky Coppinger - Major League Baseball pitcher
- Alan Culpepper - distance runner
- John Curry - college football linebacker for the Texas Tech Red Raiders
- Kevin Curtis - former professional football player and football coach
- Alana de la Garza - actress, Law and Order
- Stephen Espinoza - Showtime executive
- Oscar Leeser - mayor of El Paso, Texas
- Drew Litton, cartoonist
- Ivan Melendez, professional baseball player
- John Moyer - bassist for the alternative metal band Disturbed
- Ana Alicia Ortiz - actress
- Jacob Pace - Internet entrepreneur
- David Rodriguez - professional boxer
- Omar Rodríguez-López - member of the band The Mars Volta
- Jaylon Thomas, professional football player
- Kirk Wilson - professional soccer player
- Todd Womack - comedian
- Carey Cox- Actress, most notable appearance in the Hulu Original The Handmaid's Tale.
