= Northeast El Paso =

Area of El Paso, Texas

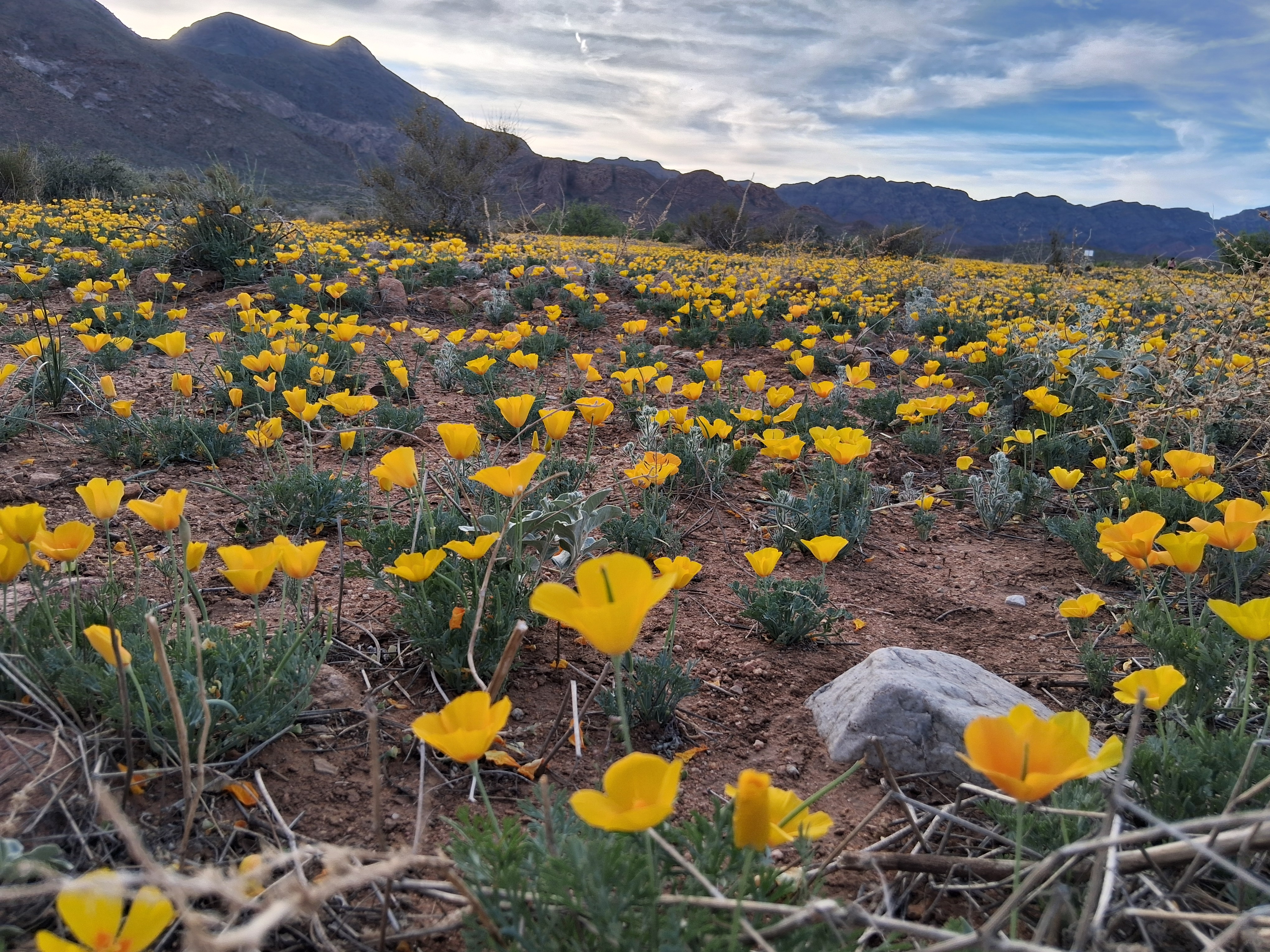
Poppies and Franklin Mountains in the Northeast

Northeast El Paso is part of the city of El Paso, Texas and is located north of Central El Paso, and east of the Franklin Mountains. Its southern boundary is variously given as Fred Wilson Boulevard or Cassidy Road and Van Buren Avenue, and it extends northward to the New Mexico state line; some portions of this region lie outside the city limits, including parts of Franklin Mountains State Park and areas of Fort Bliss: the Logan Heights area of Fort Bliss around Chapin High School and Castner Range National Monument, an old firing range northwest of Hondo Pass Drive and Gateway South Boulevard. Development of Northeast El Paso, which had begun before the Second World War around the Logan Heights area, started in earnest during the 1950s, when many homes were demolished in the process of the construction of Interstate 10. It is one of the more ethnically diverse areas of town due to a high concentration of military families. Northeast El Paso has historically not developed at a rate comparable to East El Paso and Northwest El Paso, but in recent years, it has seen an increase in development. It is expected that the population in Northeast El Paso will grow more rapidly as a result of the troop increase for Fort Bliss in the coming years. Northeast El Paso has gained recognition throughout the city for schools like Parkland, Irvin, Andress and Chapin because of their outstanding athletic programs.

== History ==
Northeast El Paso was once an un-mapped open plain prior to the 1880s, when the first surveys of the area took place. The area was first called La Noria, which means "the well," and which was suggested by Mrs. Joseph Magoffin. A cemetery was founded in the 1800s in the area now near Magoffin Middle School called the McGill Pauper Cemetery. The cemetery was founded by a judge, Joseph McGill, and stopped accepting new burials in 2009. In 1893, Fort Bliss was relocated to El Paso in the Northeast area. In 1906, around 20,000 cattle grazed in the area.

An important portion of the Northeast, the plats of Tobin, New Tobin and Nations Map of Tobin date to 1907. In this area, Frank R. Tobin created a post office, electric plant, fire department and well. An ad in the El Paso Herald touted that $1 was enough to get started in investing in "Nations' Tobin Town." The community was owned by 1,200 people, but failed because it was too far away from the city of El Paso at the time.

A small town called Lynchville grew up north of Fort Bliss and existed during World War I. This land was then granted to Fort Bliss for the Sierra Madre housing project in World War II. In 1955, the land was given back to the city.

In 1926, Fort Bliss obtained land that became Biggs Field.

Lots were platted in 1953 and 1954 along the edge of El Paso. Mountain View plat was filed by Charles H. Foster in 1953–54. The firm Haynesworth and Huckleberry filed the Tobin Park Plat in 1955. Also in 1955, William Mayfield filed the Mountain Park plat. The city also began to annex land going north, until in 1959, the city boundary was only five miles away from the Texas-New Mexico border.

In 1960, the NorthPark Mall, made up of more than fifty stores was built on Dyer Street. The outdoor mall opened on May 1, 1960, and was designed by the firm Nesmith and Lane and built by J.E. Morgan and Son and Karam Construction Company. It cost around $800,000 to build and was an alternative to shopping in downtown El Paso. It was also the largest shopping area in El Paso at the time. During the 1960s, the mall was the "Northeast area's heartbeat," according to the El Paso Times. By the late 70s and early 80s, Northgate faced competition from other malls and in the 1990s, it slowly died with store after store becoming boarded up. The city purchased the property for $6 million. After years of neglect, the mall was demolished in 2011. Other major shopping areas include Sunrise Center and Rushfair.

== Demographics ==
The area had only 201 residents in 1950. In 1953, there were around 8,000 residents. There were around 84,000 people living in Northeast El Paso in 1960. In 1964, the population had grown to 46,010. The quick growth of Northeast El Paso after 1950 was due to the post-war housing boom which attracted young professionals to the area.

According to El Paso Parks and Recreation public relations coordinator, Wayne Thornton, the Northeast "has the largest concentration of youth, especially teenagers, on the streets."

== Cityscape ==
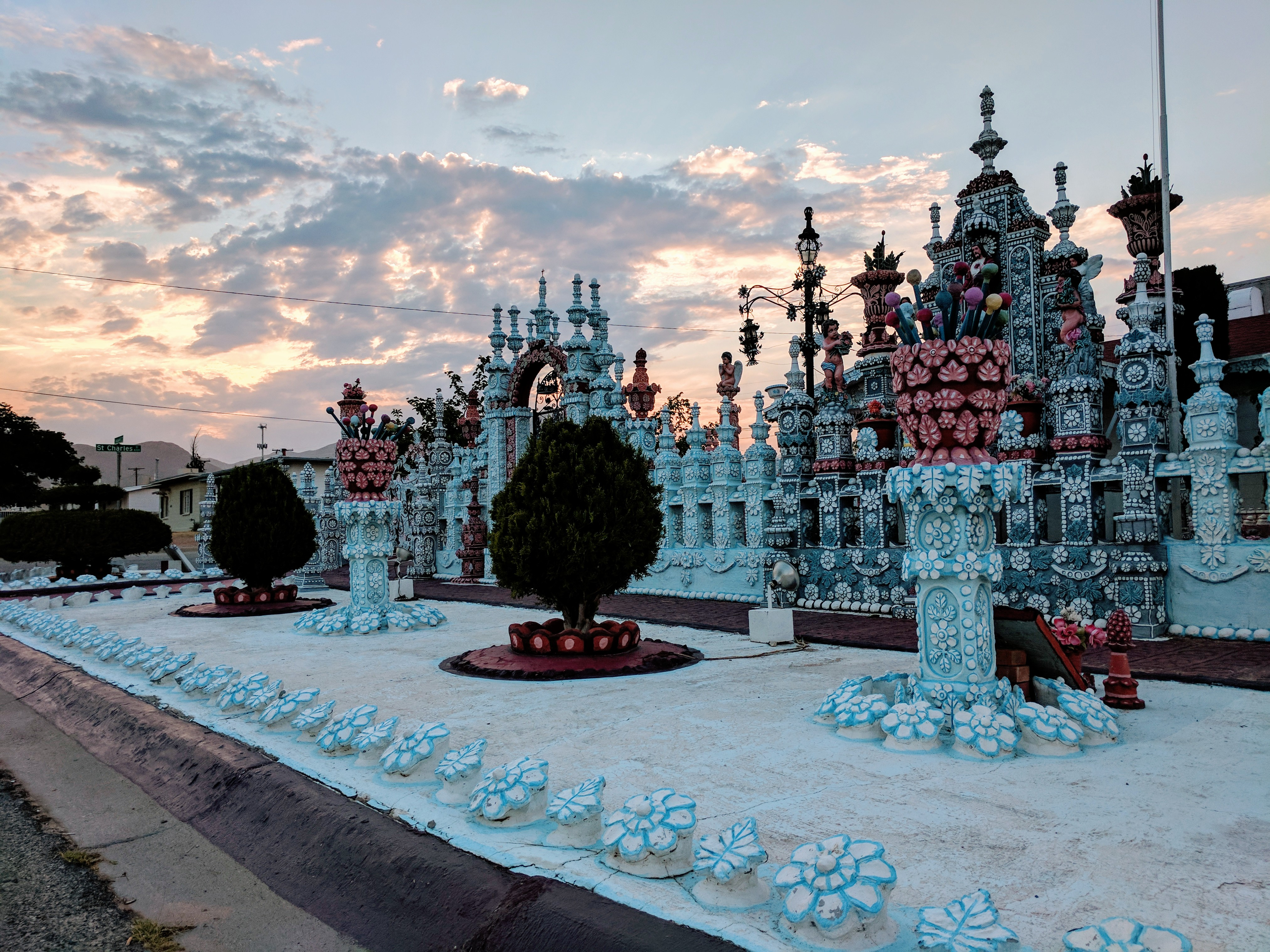
The Sugar House in the Northeast.

Northeast El Paso is bounded by the Franklin Mountains, New Mexico, Fort Bliss and railroad tracks at Memorial Park. In 1964, the Transmountain Road was approved in order to connect the northeast and northwest of El Paso across the Franklin Mountains.One of the main thoroughfares through the Northeast is Dyer Street. Former El Paso mayor, John Cook, said, "Dyer is very indicative of Northeast El Paso. It is our living room. When people see Dyer they see the Northeast." Between Gateway North, Dyer street and Hondo Pass is the neighborhood known as Angel's Triangle.

An unusual house known as the "Sugar House" is located in the Northeast. The home is owned by Rufino Loya who started decorating his home with statues and mosaics starting in 1973. The style is similar to art from Zacatecas.

=== Neighborhoods ===
One of the neighborhoods in the area was once known as the Devil's Triangle, though after police and resident action, became known as the Angel's Triangle. Other neighborhoods include Castner Heights, which is bordered by the Patriot Freeway, Diana Drive and Hondo Pass Drive. Castner Heights has a neighborhood association of around 400 people as of 2009. Castner Heights has faced controversy over the bright canary yellow that the local elementary school, Whitaker, was painted. Logan Heights is a military housing area close to Fort Bliss. The Milagro Hills neighborhood is bounded by Transmountain Road, Diana Street and Dyer Street. In 2009, the neighborhood established the Milagro Hills Neighborhood Association. Another neighborhood in the northeast is Mountain Park, which is built high into the Franklin Mountains.

== Healthcare ==
The William Beaumont Army General Hospital was opened on July 1, 1921, on an area that had once been a rifle range. The name was changed to William Beaumont Army Medical Center and dedicated on July 1, 1972.

== Arts and culture ==
The Bowen Ranch is on the edge of Northeast El Paso and the Southern New Mexico border. It's an 88,000 acre working ranch with a restaurant called the Edge of Texas Steakhouse and Saloon. The ranch has been in the area since the 1800s where it was located along the Old Salt Trail. Jimmy Bowen began working the ranch in 1953 and bought the land piece by piece over time. There are four kinds of cattle raised on the ranch: Herefords, Brahmans, longhorns and Brafords.

=== Area Museums ===
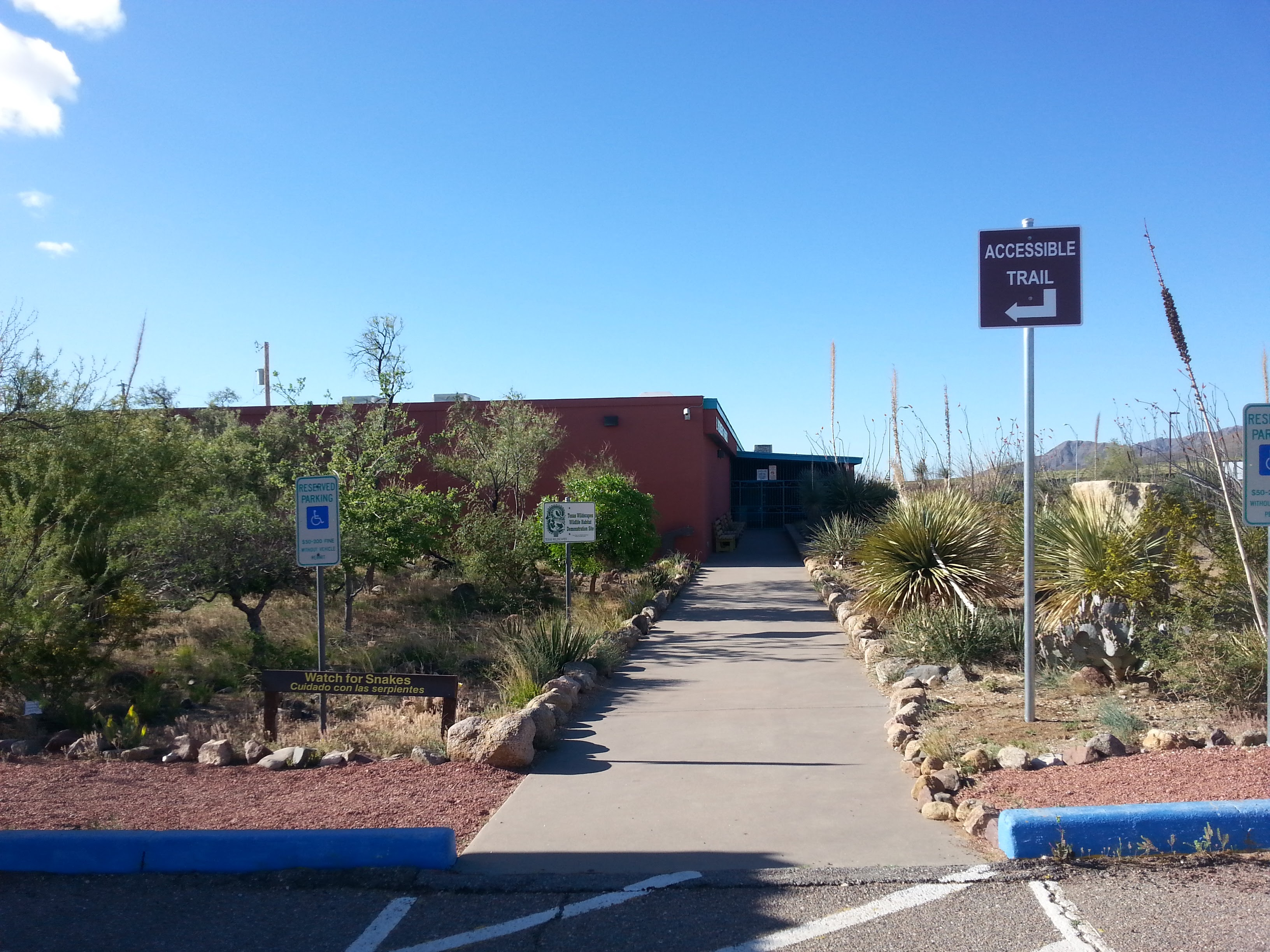
Entrance to the El Paso Museum of Archaeology

The Wilderness Park Museum, later known as the El Paso Museum of Archaeology, opened on October 12, 1977. The mayor, Fred Hervey, paid for the construction himself, which cost $75,000. This museum had dioramas about life before Spanish colonization of the area, a nature trail featuring a kiva, pithouse and Pueblo ruin and other exhibits. The museum sponsors an annual Franklin Mountain Poppies Fest in the spring when the California poppies are in bloom.

== Parks and recreation ==
Residents of the Northeast feel that their parks and recreation areas are very important, according to the El Paso Times. Recreation centers provide activities for families, children and teens to have interesting things to do in their own neighborhood.

Grandview Park, on Jefferson Road was upgraded in 2005 to include an improved playground, new basketball courts, swimming pool and tennis courts.

Todd Ware Park is located in the Castner Heights neighborhood and has a good view of the Franklin Mountains. Improvements to the park were made in 2009 which included additional trash cans and better lighting.

=== Nations Tobin Park ===
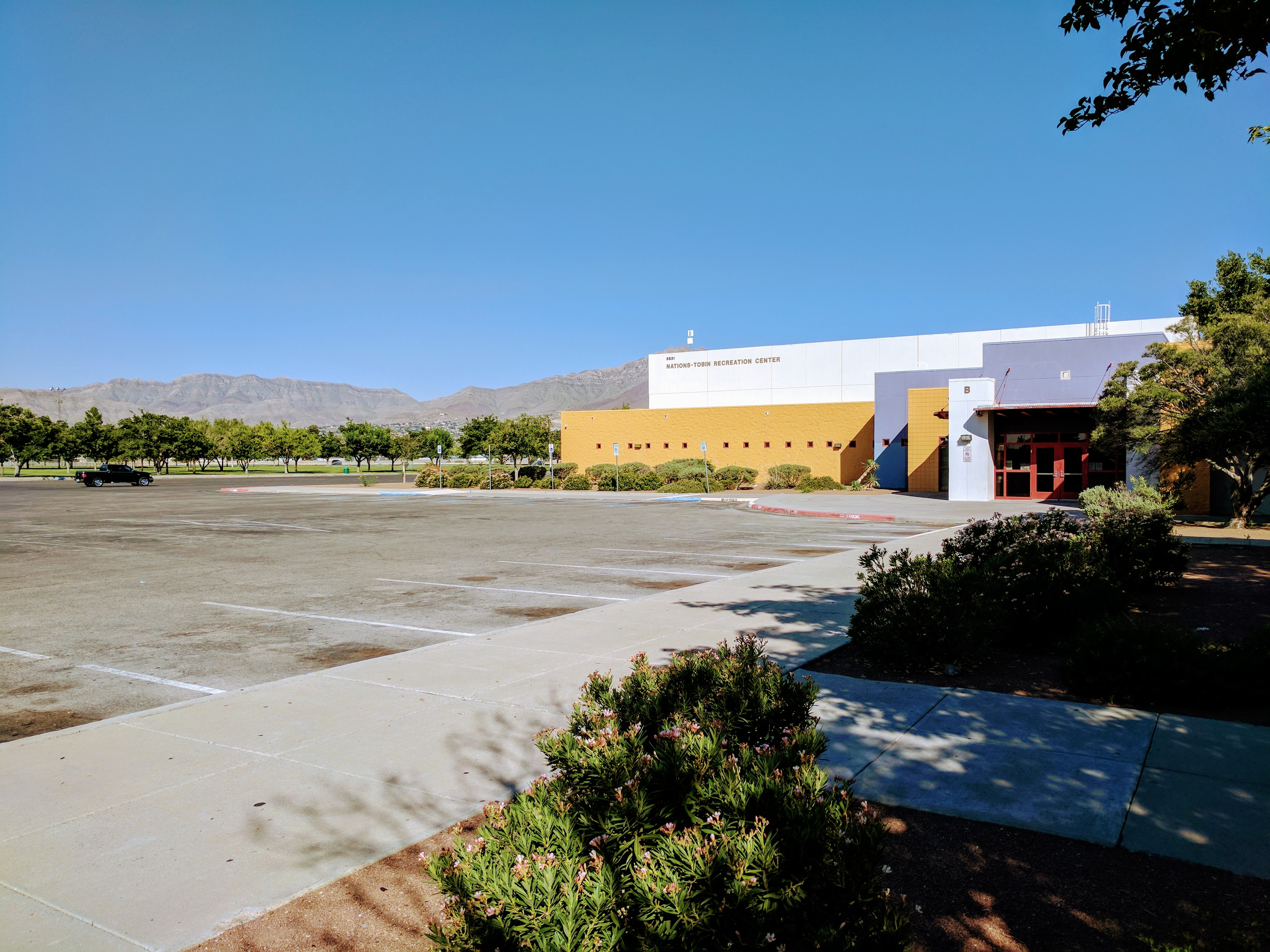
Nations Tobin Recreation Center in El Paso, Texas.

Frank Tobin established a rival town ten miles to the northeast of El Paso in the 1900s, but it was considered too far away and quickly failed. Today, Nations Tobin Park lies on part of this area. The original recreation center was built in 1961. Currently, the Nation's Tobin Recreation Center includes a regulation-sized hockey rink with raised seating for 500 spectators. The aquatic area was first opened in 1960. The pool is L-shaped, 25 meters long and has showers and dressing rooms available. At the end of the swimming season, the Nations Tobin Aquatic Center hosts a Dog Swim Day where dogs are allowed to swim in the pool and compete in various contests. After the swim day, the city cleans and drains the outdoor pool for the season. Dog Swim Day was first hosted on September 6, 2008.

=== Veterans Park ===
Veterans Park, which also has the Northeast Recreation Center, was upgraded in 2005. The park and rec center received a paved parking lot, repairs to fencing and additional picnic tables. The recreation center provides day care, and there is also a pool at Veterans Park.

The southwest corner of the park, near the intersection of Salem and Rushing features the sculpture Days of Valor.

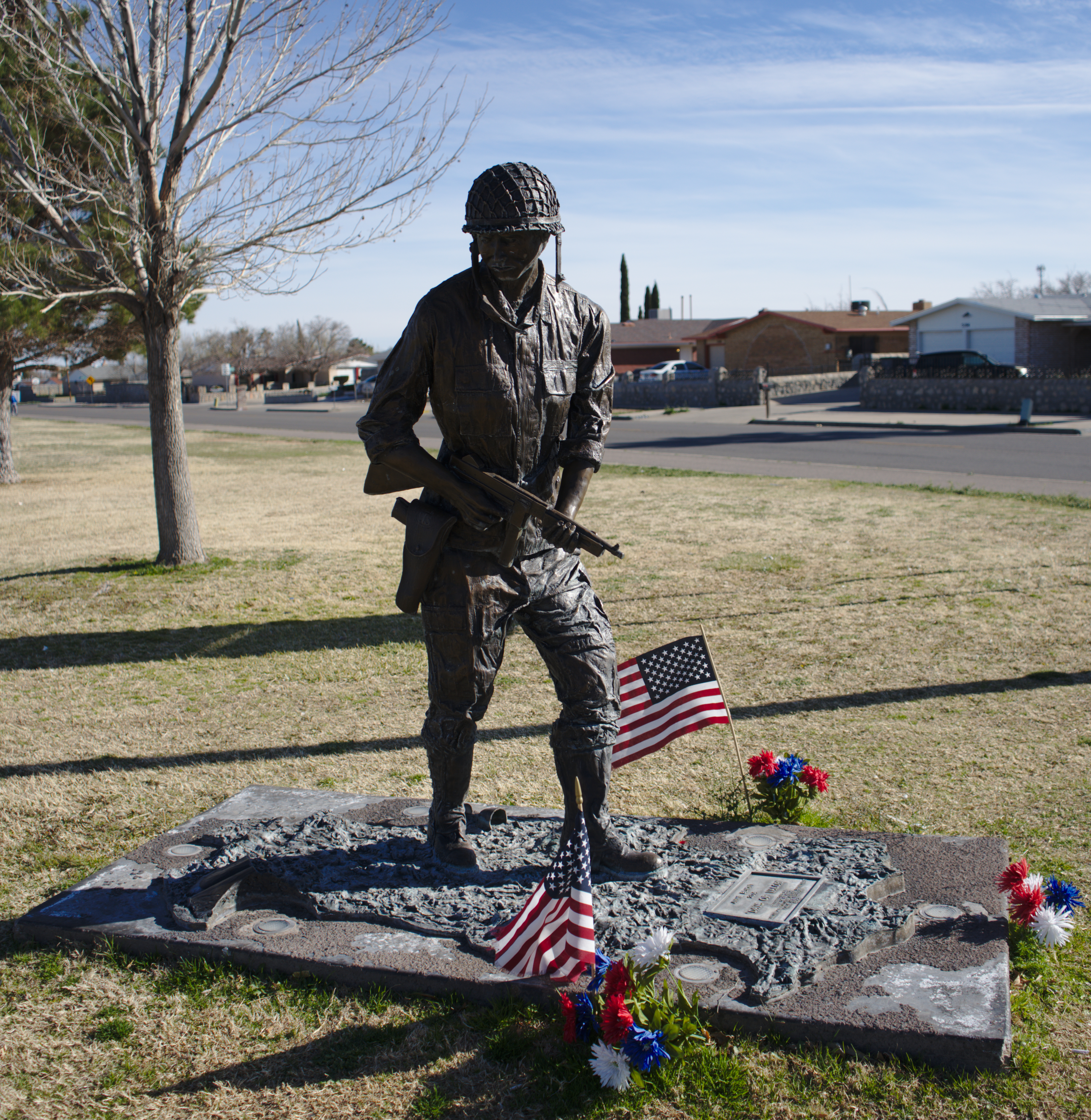
The Sculpture Days of Valor at Veterans Park

=== Other parks ===
McKelligon Canyon was purchased by El Paso County in 1931. Federal relief money helped pay for a four-mile road into the canyon and originating at Alabama street.

Castner Range is an area which is seeking national monument status and is located on the east slopes of the Franklin Mountains. It's an area that takes up around 7,081 acres and is one of the largest natural spaces in El Paso. Castner Range is part of the Chihuahuan Desert, home to over 100 different kinds of birds and is of archaeological significance, especially for the petroglyphs in the area. Castner Range was an artillery range for Fort Bliss and has been unused since the 1970s. In 2012, Representative Silvestre Reyes introduced a bill to transfer the area to the Franklin Mountains State Park. In 2016, efforts were underway to petition President Barack Obama to declare the area a national monument.

=== Community gardens ===
Community gardens are also present in the neighborhoods. The Weldon Yerby Senior Gardens are located in the Castner Heights neighborhood near the YWCA. The Weldon Yerby garden is most likely the oldest community garden in El Paso, according to the El Paso Times. Approximately 100 people contribute to and work on the garden which was started to encourage senior citizens to get exercise and eat healthier.

== Education ==
With the increase in population in the area, major public school construction was underway in the 1960s. Public schools located in Northeast are in El Paso Independent School District (EPISD) and Ysleta Independent School District (YISD). El Paso Independent Schools from Kindergarten - Grade 5 are 19 Elementary schools: Tom Lea, Barron, Nixon, Bradley, Fannin, Newman, Collins, Dowell, Schuster, Crosby, Whitaker, Stanton, H. R. Moye, Park, Robert E. Lee, Logan, Powell, Milam, and Bliss. Five Middle Schools: Richardson, HE Charles, Terrace Hills, Canyon Hills, and Maggofin. Five High Schools: Parkland, Andress, Transmountain Early College, Irvin, and Chapin.

=== Public Libraries ===
The Richard Burges Library Branch of the El Paso Public Library was once located next to NorthPark Mall on Dyer Street. The Friends of the Northeast also ran a bookstore where NorthPark Mall once was located. Richard Burges Branch is closed to the public beginning on November 6, 2017, for expansion and renovation funded by the 2012 Quality of Life Bond Issue. The completion estimate is one year. The project includes: New dedicated children's room Public art piece designed by local artist Hal Marcus Expanded & dedicated computer lab Expanded community meeting room space Additional study room Dedicated and revitalized teen area Dedicated Friends of the Library bookstore Self-service check out stations

== Infrastructure ==
In 1951, residents faced a lack of water, possibly due to a lack of infrastructure for the Northeast. A new sewer line was installed in the area in 1952.

In 2014, it was announced that a solar power station, the Newman Solar Project, would be built in the Northeast. This project was the largest solar project in El Paso in 2015.

== Industry ==
Residents in the Northeast began to complain about dust and damage to the Franklin Mountains due to the operation of the Hugh McMillan's rock quarry in 1953. The quarry was located near McKelligan Canyon.

== Notable residents ==
- John Cook
- Ray Mickens
