= Andress High School =

Public school in Texas, United States

Location
- 5400 Sun Valley Drive; El Paso, Texas 79924; United States; 31°54′38″N 106°25′08″W

Information
- Type: Public
- Established: 1961
- School district: El Paso Independent School District
- Faculty: 104.32 (on FTE basis)
- Grades: 9 to 12
- Enrollment: 1,560 (2017–18)
- Student to teacher ratio: 14.95
- Colors: Maroon and Gold
- Athletics conference: 1-5A
- Mascot: Golden Eagle
- Website: www.episd.org/o/ahs/

Andress High School is a public high school located on the northeast side of El Paso, Texas. The school serves about 2,000 students in the El Paso Independent School District. It is located in the Sun Valley neighborhood at the intersection of Sun Valley Drive and Mackinaw Street. Andress High is currently the northernmost of EPISD's ten comprehensive high schools, serving the portion of Northeast El Paso between the Franklin Mountains and McCombs Street and north of Woodrow Bean Transmountain Road (Texas Loop 375) west of Girl Scout Way and Fairbanks Drive east of it, up to the New Mexico state line. Virtually all of the northern half of the Andress attendance zone, that is, north of Loma Real Avenue, is undeveloped land, most of it slated for future residential development. A new high school, as yet unnamed, which will serve what is now the portion of the Andress attendance zone north of the Patriot Freeway (US 54) to the New Mexico state line, is in the planning stages, and was originally slated to be built using funding from a 2007 bond issue; however, in 2014 it was decided by the EPISD board of managers that development of the area did not yet justify a new high school and the funds set aside for its construction were reallocated. The money allocated went to Franklin High School.

Andress High's feeder schools include H.E. Charles, Nolan Richardson, and Terrace Hills Middle Schools; the elementary schools in the Andress feeder pattern include Barron, Bradley, Collins, Fannin, Tom Lea, Newman, and Nixon. Terrace Hills, whose attendance zone extends south of Woodrow Bean Transmountain Road, also graduates into Irvin High.

Andress High was named for local attorney and school board member Theodore A. (Ted) Andress, who was murdered at the El Paso airport by a mentally unbalanced man he had been feuding with just before the school opened in 1961.

== Clubs and activities ==
- Band
- Orchestra
- Student Council
- Group Theatre
- Debate
- FCCLA
- CosPlay
- Unity Club
- Booster Club
- Choir and Piano
- Cheerleading
- Law Enforcement
- Dance
- Anime Club
- Military Leadership Club
- HighQ

== Notable alumni ==
- Jeremiah Cooper, college football defensive back for the Iowa State Cyclones
- Shoshana Johnson, female POW in Iraq War
- Ray Mickens, American football cornerback
- Jamar Ransom, Arena Football League player
- Paul Smith, NFL fullback
- Brian Young, NFL defensive tackle
