= Jacob Pace =

Internet entrepreneur and celebrity

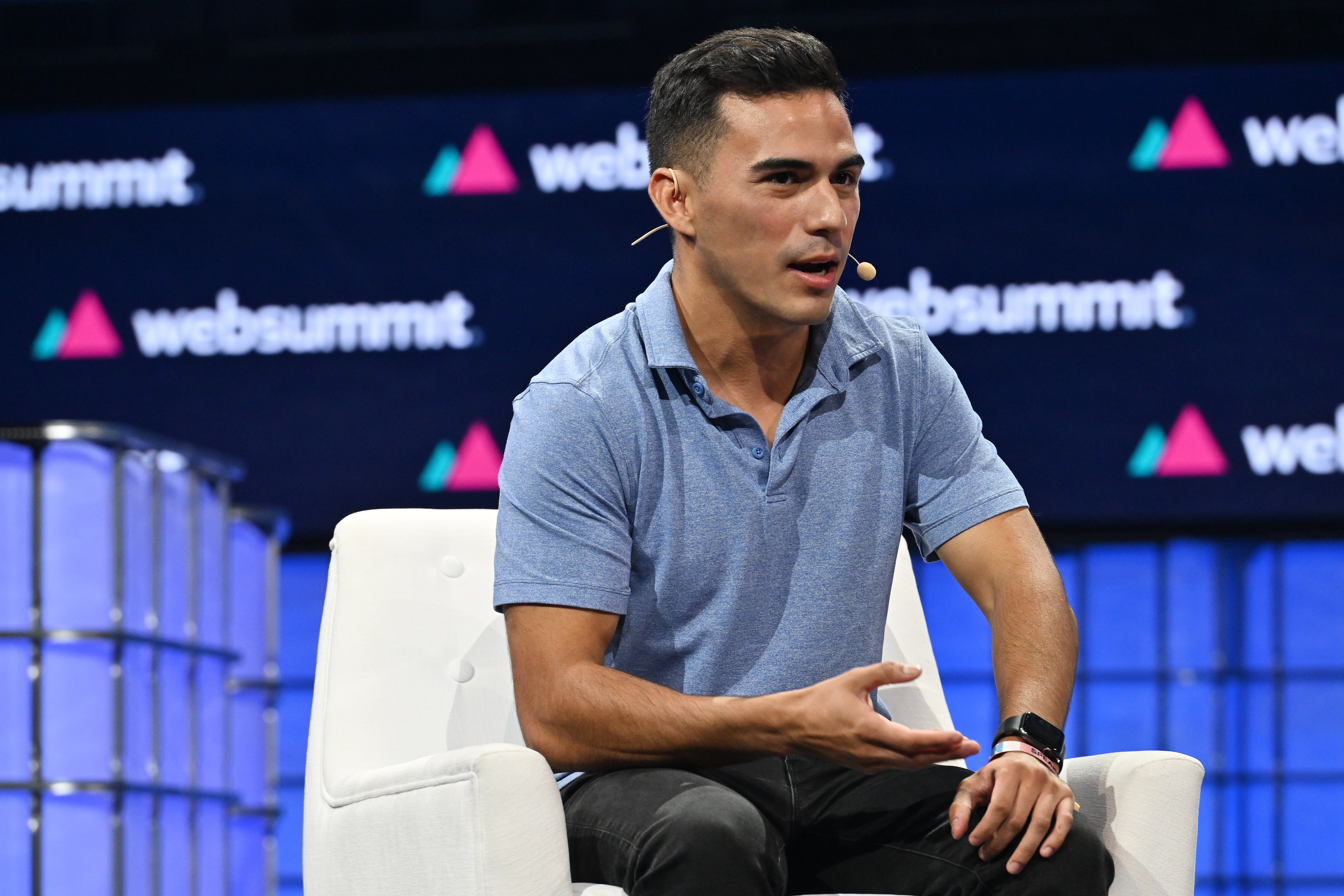
- Born: September 6, 1998 (age 28); El Paso, Texas, United States
- Title: CEO and Founder, Pace & Co.

Jacob Pace (born September 6, 1998) is an American Internet entrepreneur and media executive. He is the founder and CEO of Pace & Co., a social media and influencer marketing agency.

He founded Flighthouse, a short-form digital content studio, within Create Music Group, serving as its CEO until departing the company in 2021.

== Early life ==
Pace was born in El Paso, Texas. At age 14, he started a YouTube channel to promote music he was producing.

== Career ==
In 2015, Pace was recruited by Create Music Group after he graduated high school. He moved to Los Angeles, California at age 16.

In 2016, Pace founded Flighthouse as a content studio within Create Music Group. As CEO of Flighthouse, Pace grew the brand to more than 27 million followers and over one billion views per month.

In 2021, Pace was hired by Pearpop, a creator marketplace co-founded by Guy Oseary to be their Chief Strategy Officer.

In 2023, Pace founded Pace & Co., a social media and influencer marketing agency.

== Awards and honors ==
Business

- Forbes 30 Under 30
- Rolling Stone Future 25
