= East El Paso =

- Neighborhood of El Paso
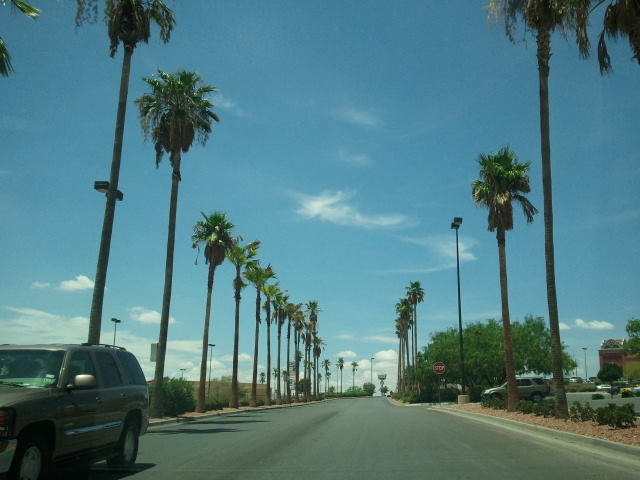
- East El Paso
- Interactive map of East El Paso
- Country: United States
- State: Texas
- City: El Paso

Population
  - Total: 231,493 (2,020)

East El Paso is an area of El Paso, Texas, United States, that is located north of Interstate 10, east of Airway Blvd., and south of Montana Ave. East El Paso is the fastest growing area of town. With a population of 231,493, east El Paso is also the largest area of El Paso.

== Neighborhoods ==
A partial list of neighborhoods in east El Paso:

- Ysleta
- Album Park
- Cielo Vista
- Desert Sands
- Eastwood Heights
- Eastwood Knolls
- Eastridge
- Vista Hills
- Pebble Hills
- Indian Ridge
- Vista Del Sol
- Parkwood
- East Glen
- Oasis Ranch
- Tierra Del Este
- Tres Suenos
- Rancho Del Sol
- Stonegate
- Los Paseos
- Sun Ridge
- Sean Dewar
- Quail Run

== School districts ==
- El Paso Independent School District
- Socorro Independent School District
- Ysleta Independent School District
