= El Paso Independent School District =

School district in Texas, United States

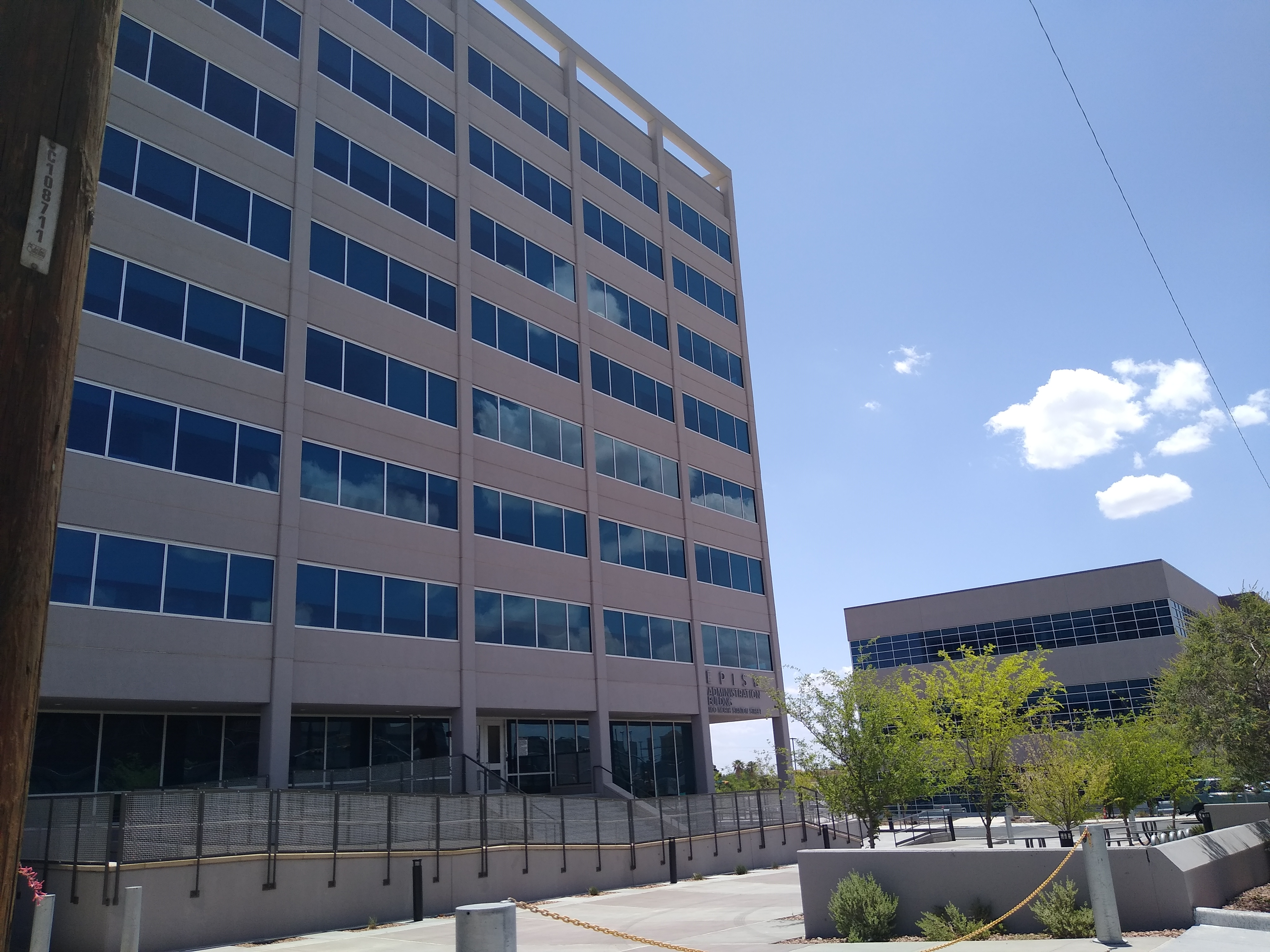
- EPISD headquarters

Address
- 1014 N. Stanton El Paso, TX, 79902; United States

District information
- Type: Public, Independent
- Grades: PK, KG, 1–12
- Established: 1883; 143 years ago
- School board: 7 trustees
- Governing agency: Texas Education Agency
- Schools: 93 (2016–17)
- NCES District ID: 4818300
- District ID: TX-071902

Students and staff
- Students: 59,424 (2016–17)
- Teachers: 3,976.58 (FTE) (2016–17)
- Student–teacher ratio: 14.94:1 (2016–17)

Other information
- Website: www.episd.org

The El Paso Independent School District (or EPISD) is the largest school district serving El Paso, Texas (USA). Originally organized in 1883, it is currently the largest district in the Texas Education Agency's Educational Service Center (ESC) Region 19, as well as the largest district within the city of El Paso and El Paso County. The EPISD also provides public education to the children of U.S. Army soldiers stationed at Fort Bliss. The district headquarters are located in El Paso.

In 2009, the school district was rated "academically acceptable" by the Texas Education Agency.

== Board of trustees ==
A school board manages the EPISD (called the Board of Trustees) composed of seven publicly elected school board trustees and a single superintendent. Each trustee represents one of the seven districts in the EPISD.

== Statistics ==
- More than 63,000 students.
- 92 campuses.
- With over 9,000 employees, it is the largest employer in El Paso.
- Covers more than 253 square miles (660 km^{2}).
- Estimated annual operating budget is $ 403 million.
- Twelfth-largest school district in Texas (as of 2016–2017).
- 57th largest school district in the United States.

== History ==
- In 1882, El Paso Independent School District was established, with Joseph Magoffin, Samuel Freudenthal, and Edward Pew as the founding trustees and Calvin W. Esterly as the first superintendent.
- In 1889, the first kindergarten ever established in Texas was established at Alamo Elementary School in the EPISD.
- In 1916, the first high school in the EPISD was established: El Paso High School.
- In 1927, Bowie High School was established to reduce overcrowding at El Paso High School by converting a grammar school built in 1923 in Central El Paso.
- In 1930, Austin High School was established as the third high school in the EPISD, admitting its first students following its construction in 1929.
- In 1949, Jefferson High School was established in Central El Paso
- In 1955, Burges High School was established in East El Paso.
- In 1959, Irvin High School was established in Northeast El Paso.
- In 1961, Andress High School was established in Northeast El Paso.
- In 1962, Coronado High School was established in Northwest El Paso.
- In 1993, Franklin High School was established in Northwest El Paso.
- In 1999, the district's oldest operating school, Alamo Elementary School, celebrated its 100th birthday.
- In 2000, Chapin High School was established in Northeast El Paso.
- In 2011, the district's superintendent Lorenzo Garcia was arrested by the FBI. He later pleaded guilty to conspiracy to commit mail fraud- he stole money from the district and also had high school principals illegally kick students out of school and illegally change 10th graders to being listed as members of other grades, in order to cheat on the state's standardized tests.
- In 2012, the district's board of trustees were stripped of power by the Texas Education Agency, and oversight of the district was given to a TEA-appointed board of managers because the trustees failed to stop Garcia's wrongdoing and failed to fire his co-conspirators after he was arrested.

== List of schools ==
=== High schools ===
- Located in Central El Paso
  - Austin High School
- Located in East El Paso
  - Burges High School
- Located in Northeast El Paso
  - Andress High School
  - Chapin High School
  - Irvin High School
  - Transmountain Early College High School
- Located in South Central El Paso
  - Bowie High School
  - Jefferson High School
  - Silva Health Magnet High School
    - 2003, 2011, 2017 National Blue Ribbon School
- Located in West El Paso
  - Coronado High School
  - Franklin High School
- Located in West Central El Paso
  - El Paso High School

=== Middle schools ===
- Located in Central El Paso
  - Armendariz Middle School
  - Bassett Middle School
  - Ross Middle School
- Located in East El Paso
  - MacArthur Elementary-Intermediate School
- Located in Northeast El Paso
  - Canyon Hills Middle School
  - Charles Middle School
  - Magoffin Middle School
  - Richardson Middle School
  - Terrace Hills Middle School
- Located in South Central El Paso
  - Guillen Middle School
  - Henderson Middle School
- Located in West El Paso
  - Brown Middle School
  - Haskins Elementary-Intermediate School
  - Hornedo Middle School
- Located in West Central El Paso
  - Wiggs Middle School

=== Elementary schools ===
- Located in Central El Paso
  - Clendenin Elementary School
  - Coldwell Elementary School
  - Crockett Elementary School
    - 1985–86 National Blue Ribbon School
  - Hillside Elementary School
    - 2000–01 National Blue Ribbon School
  - Hughey Elementary School
  - Moreno Elementary School
  - Rusk Elementary School
  - Travis Elementary School
- Located in East El Paso
  - Cielo Vista Elementary School
- Located on Fort Bliss
  - Bliss Elementary School
  - Logan Elementary School
  - Milam Elementary School
  - Powell Elementary School
- Located in Northeast El Paso
  - Barron Elementary School
  - Collins Elementary School
  - Moye Elementary School
  - Newman Elementary School
  - Nixon Elementary School
  - Park Elementary School
  - Stanton Elementary School
  - Sunrise Mountain Elementary School (formerly Lee Elementary School; renamed in 2020)
  - Tom Lea Elementary School
  - Torres Elementary School
  - Whitaker Elementary School
- Located in West El Paso
  - Green Elementary School
  - Guerrero Elementary School
  - Herrera Elementary School
  - Johnson Elementary School
  - Kohlberg Elementary School
  - Lundy Elementary School
  - Polk Elementary School
  - Putnam Elementary School
  - Rivera Elementary School
  - Tippin Elementary School
  - Western Hills Elementary School
  - White Elementary School
- Located in South Central El Paso
  - Aoy Elementary School
  - Clardy Elementary School
  - Cooley Elementary School
  - Douglass Elementary School
  - Hart Elementary School
  - Hawkins Elementary School
  - Zavala Elementary School
- Located in West Central El Paso
  - Lamar Elementary School
  - Mesita Elementary School

=== Special campuses ===
- College Career and Technology Academy (formerly Sunset High School and School Age Parent Center)
- Occupational Center
- Regional Day School For The Deaf
- San Jacinto Adult Learning Center
- Telles Academy (disciplinary campus)
- Young Women's STEAM Research & Preparatory Academy

=== Former campuses ===
- Alamo Elementary School (in South-Central El Paso; closed 2005; initially slated to reopen following renovations, but consolidated with Hart Elementary School in 2011)
- Alta Vista Elementary School (in East-Central El Paso; closed in 2019 due to declining enrollment)
- Beall Elementary School (in South-Central El Paso; closed in 2019 due to declining enrollment)
- Bond Elementary School (in West El Paso; consolidated with Roberts Elementary and Lincoln Middle to form Haskins Elementary-Intermediate School in 2021)
- Bonham Elementary School (in East El Paso; closed in 2021 and consolidated with MacArthur Elementary-Intermediate)
- Bradley Elementary School (in Northeast El Paso; closed in 2021, consolidated with Fannin Elementary School at Torres Elementary School)
- Burleson Elementary School (in South-Central El Paso; closed in 2019 due to declining enrollment)
- Burnet Elementary School (in Northeast El Paso; closed in 2018 due to declining enrollment)
- Crosby Elementary School (in Northeast El Paso; consolidated with Dowell Elementary and Schuster Elementary to form Duran Elementary in 2021)
- Dowell Elementary School (in Northeast El Paso; consolidated with Crosby Elementary and Schuster Elementary to form Duran Elementary in 2021)
- Dudley Elementary School (in West-Central El Paso; replaced by Mesita Elementary School in 1948)
- Fannin Elementary School (in Northeast El Paso; closed in 2021, consolidated with Bradley Elementary School at Torres Elementary School)
- Highland Elementary School (replaced by Moreno Elementary School in 2000)
- Houston Elementary School (in East-Central El Paso; closed in 2010 due to declining enrollment, now the Houston School of Choice, a continuation high school)
- Jones Elementary School (in West-Central El Paso; closed and razed in 1972 along with the Smeltertown neighborhood it served and in which it was located)
- Lincoln Elementary School (in South-Central El Paso; moved and reconfigured to form Lincoln Middle School)
- Lincoln Middle School (in West El Paso; consolidated with Bond Elementary and Roberts Elementary to form Haskins Elementary-Intermediate School in 2021)
- Morehead Middle School
  - EPISD sold the building to the municipal government in 2023.
- Navarro Elementary School (in Ciudad Juarez since 1963 because it was located on land ceded to Mexico under the terms of the Chamizal Treaty. It now operates as a college preparatory school known as Colegio Bachilleres del Estado de Chihuahua, or COBACH).
- Roberts Elementary School (in West El Paso; consolidated with Bond Elementary and Lincoln Middle in 2021 to form Haskins Elementary-Intermediate)
- Roosevelt Elementary School (in South-Central El Paso; closed in 2006, consolidated with Aoy Elementary School)
- San Jacinto Elementary School (closed in 1976, now San Jacinto Adult Learning Center)
- Schuster Elementary School (in Northeast El Paso; closed in 2019 due to declining enrollment)
- Vilas Elementary School (in West-Central El Paso; closed in 2016, now a satellite campus of Mesita Elementary School, Mesita Early Childhood Development Center at Vilas, which serves prekindergarten to first grade)

=== Dormant campuses ===
- Wainwright Elementary School (in Northeast El Paso; mothballed since 2005; currently used as a science resource center)

== Administrative offices ==
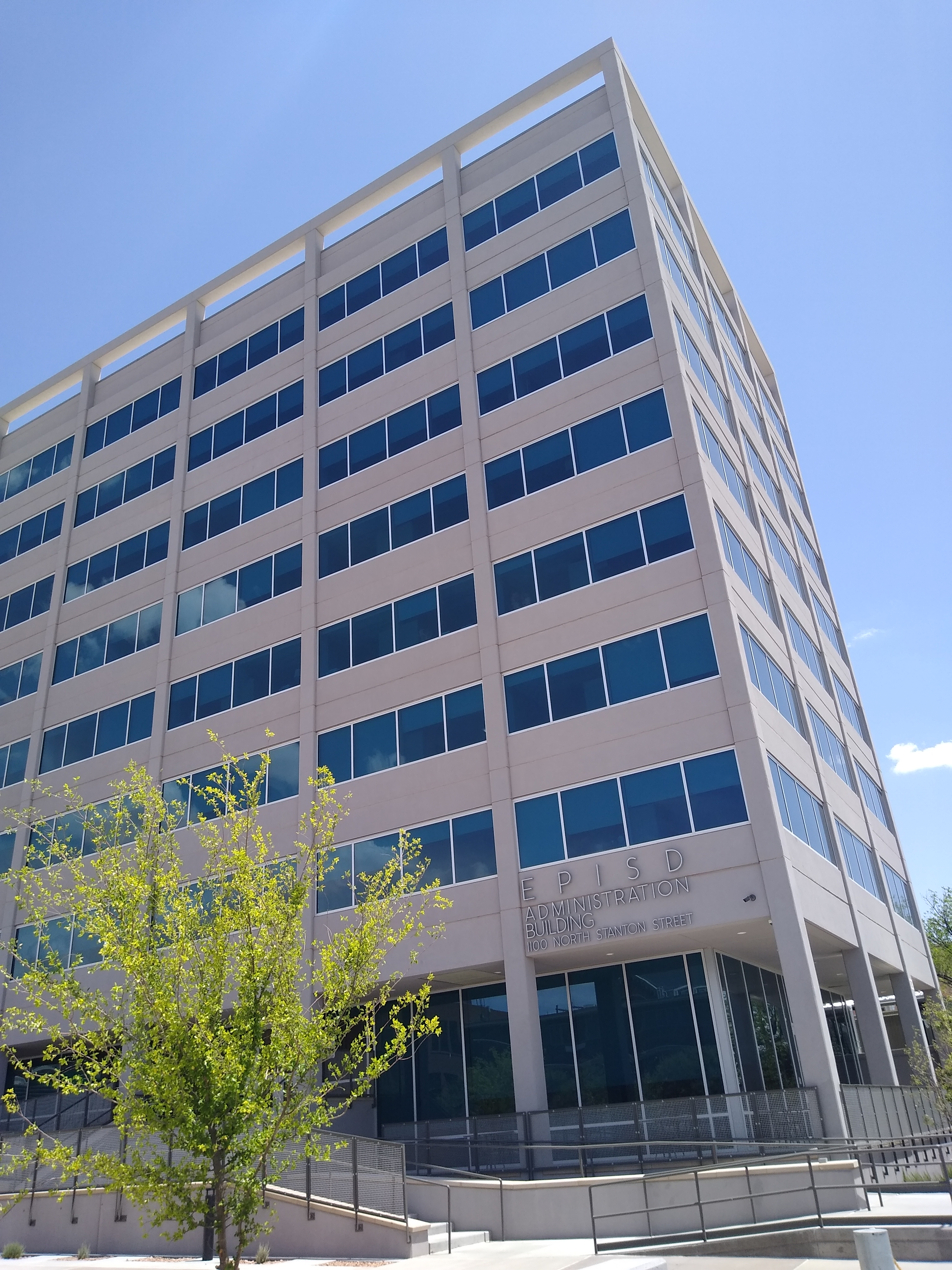
The renovated eight story building of the EPISD headquarters

Its current headquarters are in Downtown El Paso. It includes two buildings: an 80,000-square-foot (7,400 m^{2}), eight story building that was acquired and a newly built 43,000-square-foot (4,000 m^{2}), three story building.

The district began leasing a property on the grounds of El Paso International Airport in 1963 to house its administrative headquarters. By the 2010s the City of El Paso desired the use of the property for airport expansion but chose to defer the original 2014 expiration of the lease to at least December 31, 2019, so EPISD had time to find a new headquarters location. In 2021 the current EPISD headquarters opened. The district spent $3.2 million to buy the land and the building on it for the downtown headquarters.

== Notable EPISD alumni ==
- F. Murray Abraham, an award-winning actor, is a graduate of El Paso High School.
- Alan Culpepper, a two-time Olympian (2000, 2004) and three-time US Cross-Country Champion, is a graduate of Coronado High School.
- Sam Donaldson, a famous television journalist, is a graduate of El Paso High School.
- Eddie Guerrero, a former professional wrestler for World Wrestling Entertainment (WWE) who was WWE Champion, two-time WWE Intercontinental Champion and member of the WWE Hall of Fame, was a graduate of Jefferson High School.
- Emcee N.I.C.E.(Aulsondro "Novelist" Hamilton) is a Multi-Platinum musician, actor was a part of Lighter Shade of Brown the first Latin Rap group in the history. Produced iconic musicians such as Tupac, Nas, Aaron Hall & more. He is also associated with The 78th Academy Awards–winning film Crash Soundtrack along with 7 more notable soundtracks and over 30 records recorded as a member of KansasCali. He attended Travis Elementary, Bassett Junior High School, Canyon Hills Junior High & Irvin High School before moving to Kansas.
- Shoshana Johnson, a famed Iraq War POW, is a graduate of Andress High School.
- Tom Lea, famed author and painter, was a graduate of El Paso High School.
- Tom Moore, a cartoonist best known for the "Archie" comic books series, is a 1946 graduate of Austin High School.
- John Moyer, the current bassist for the rock band Disturbed, is a graduate of Coronado High School .
- Sandra Day O'Connor, a former U.S. Supreme Court Associate Justice, is a graduate of Austin High School.
- Beto O'Rourke, U.S. representative for Texas's 16th congressional district from 2013 to 2019. O'Rourke was the Democratic Party's nominee for the 2022 Texas gubernatorial election. He attended El Paso High School.
- John D. Olivas, a NASA astronaut, is a graduate of Burges High School.
- Lupe Ontiveros, a veteran actress, was a graduate of El Paso High School.
- Nolan Richardson, a nationally recognized basketball coach, graduated from Bowie High School.
- Rubén Salazar, a noted Mexican-American journalist, was a graduate of El Paso High School.

== Other notables who have attended EPISD schools ==
- Richard Ramirez, known as The Night Stalker, a serial killer who died of natural causes while awaiting execution in California, attended Jefferson High School but dropped out.
- Debbie Reynolds attended Houston and Crockett Elementary Schools before her family moved to California.
- Sharon Tate, actress and Manson Family murder victim, attended Irvin High School briefly in 1959 and 1960.

== See also ==
- List of school districts in Texas
