= Central El Paso =

City area in El Paso, Texas, USA

Central El Paso is part of the city of El Paso, Texas, and contains some of the city's oldest and most historic neighborhoods. Located in the heart of the city, it is home to approximately 130,000 people. Development of central El Paso started around 1875, when the city was barely beginning to gain its roots.

Today, central El Paso has grown into the center of the city's economy and a thriving urban community. It contains numerous historic sites and landmarks. It is close to the El Paso International Airport, Downtown El Paso, the international border, and Fort Bliss.

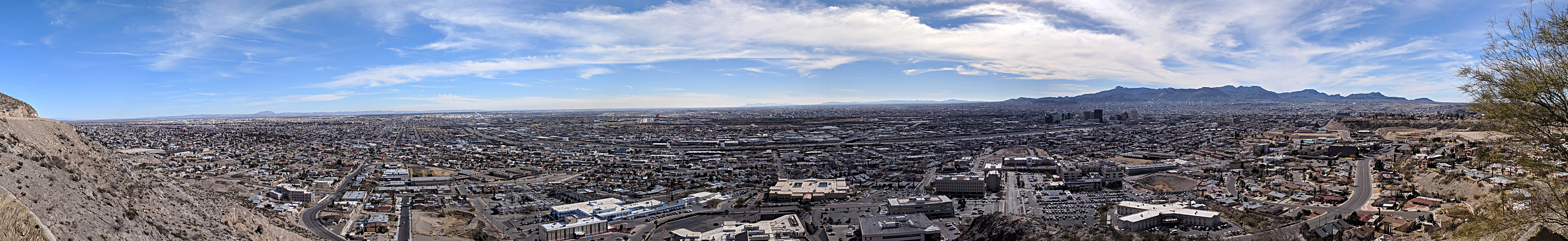
Panoramic view of Central El Paso from Murcheson Park on Scenic Drive, from Fort Bliss at the left to downtown and El Paso High School at the right

== History ==
The central El Paso area includes some of the earliest developed areas in the city. In September 1827, Juan Maria Ponce de Leon bought 211 acres of land where El Paso and Paisano streets are today. In 1849, James Wiley Magoffin purchased the lands upon which he built Magoffinsville near present-day Magoffin Avenue and Willow Street. Magoffinsville became host to Fort Bliss in January of 1854. The history of this neighborhood is preserved and interpreted at the Magoffin Homestead, a public museum in the area.

== Neighborhoods ==
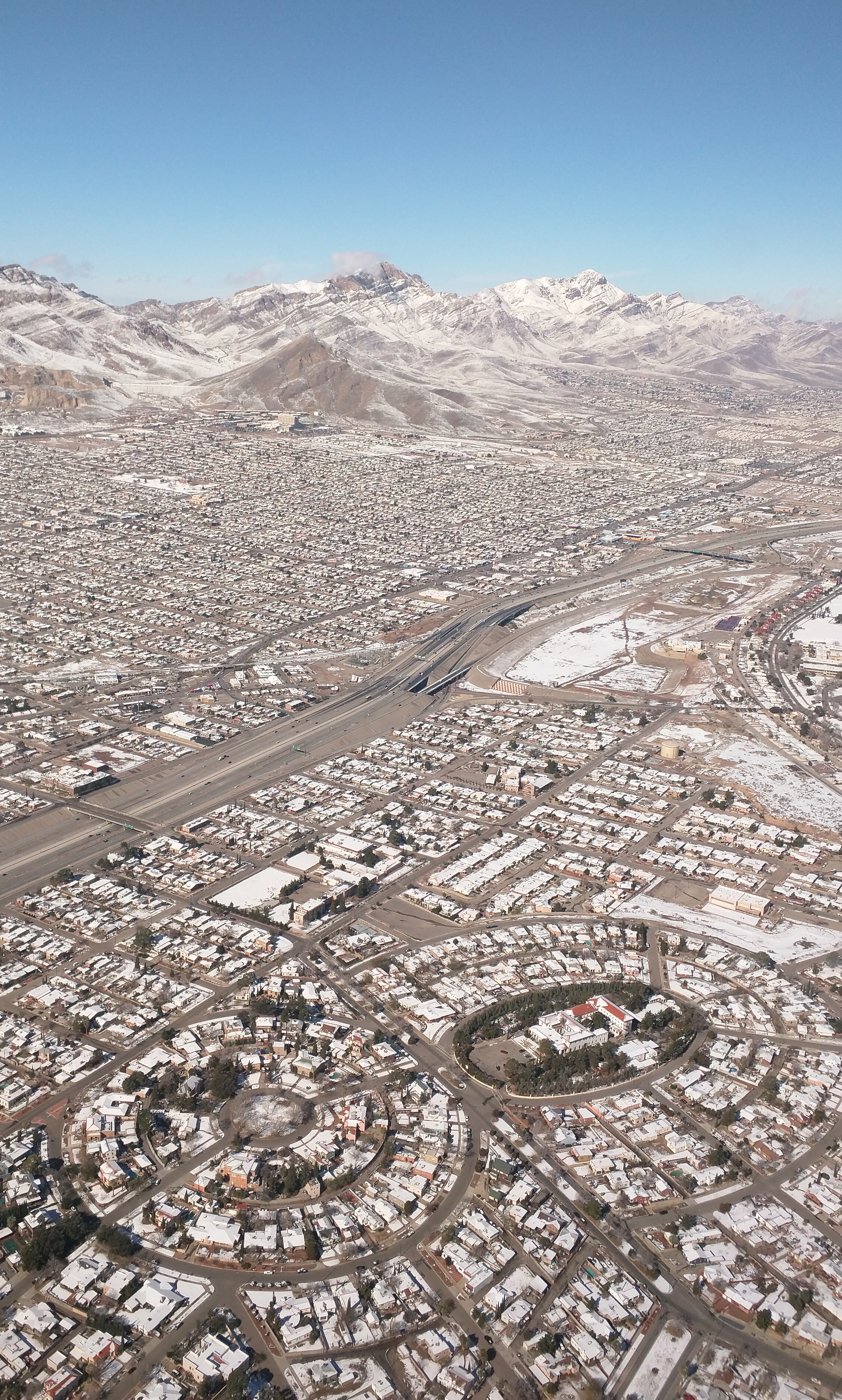
El Paso's Austin Terrace neighborhood, with snow

- Altura Park
- Austin Terrace
- Chihuahuita
- Clardy Fox
- Cotton Place
- Downtown El Paso
- El Segundo Barrio
- Government Hill
- Highland Park
- Loretto Place
- Magoffin Historic District
- Manhattan Heights
- Sambrano
- South central El Paso
