= La Fe =

La Fe or La Fé, Spanish for "The Faith", may refer to:

== Places ==
- La Fe (also named Santa Fe), a village of Isla de la Juventud, Cuba
- La Fe (Sandino), a village of Pinar del Río Province, Cuba
- La Fe (Camajuaní), former name of the settlement and sugar mill of José María Pérez, Cuba
- Ensanche La Fé, a district of the city of Santo Domingo, Dominican Republic

== Other uses ==
- La Fé (film), a 1947 film by Cesáreo González
- Alfredo de la Fé (b. 1954), a Cuban violinists
- Colegio La Fe, a school in Naguanagua, Venezuela
- Centro de Salud Familiar La Fe, a health clinic and community center in El Paso, Texas.

== See also ==
- Fe (disambiguation)
- Fee (disambiguation)
