= National Defense Authorization Act for Fiscal Year 2019 =

United States Law

John S. McCain National Defense Authorization Act for Fiscal Year 2019
- Long title: An Act to authorize appropriations for fiscal year 2019 for military activities of the Department of Defense, for military construction, and for defense activities of the Department of Energy, to prescribe military personnel strengths for such fiscal year, and for other purposes.
- Enacted by: the 115th United States Congress

Citations
- Public law: Pub. L. 115–232 (text) (PDF)
- Statutes at Large: 132 Stat. 1636 through 132 Stat. 2423

Legislative history
- Introduced in the House as National Defense Authorization Act for Fiscal Year 2019 (H.R. 5515) by Mac Thornberry (R–TX) on April 13, 2018; Committee consideration by House Armed Services Committee; Passed the House on May 24, 2018 (351–66); Passed the Senate as the John S. McCain National Defense Authorization Act for Fiscal Year 2019 on June 18, 2018 (85–10); Reported by the joint conference committee on July 25, 2018; agreed to by the House on July 26, 2018 (359–54) and by the Senate on August 1, 2018 (87–10); Signed into law by President Donald Trump on August 13, 2018

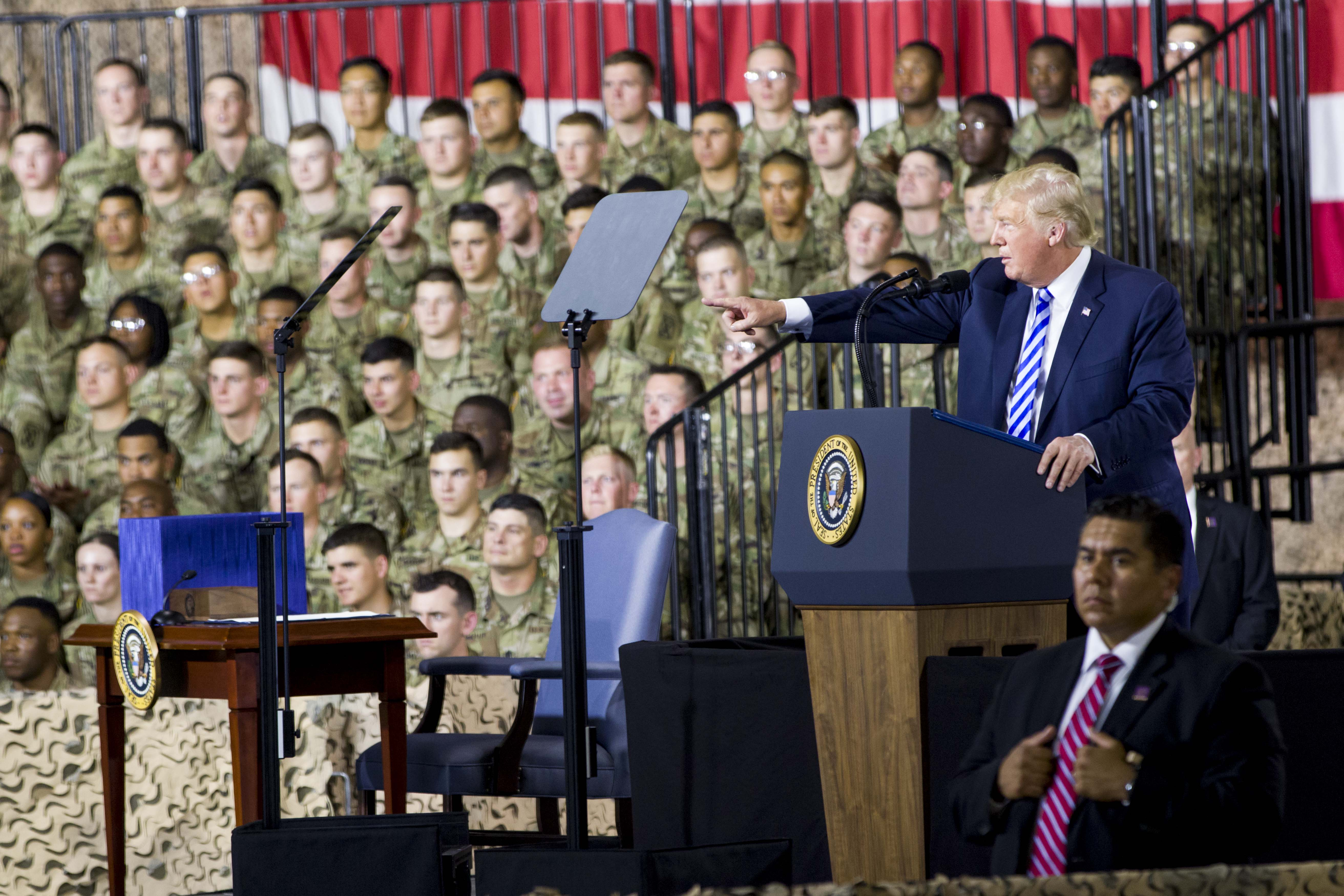
President Donald Trump speaking to Fort Drum soldiers and personnel during a signing ceremony for the NDAA 2019

The John S. McCain National Defense Authorization Act for Fiscal Year 2019 (NDAA 2019) is a United States federal law which specifies the budget, expenditures and policies of the U.S. Department of Defense (DOD) for fiscal year 2019. It was signed by President Donald Trump during a ceremony in Fort Drum, New York on August 13, 2018.

== Background and provisions ==
A Senate version of the bill contained provisions blocking a proposed settlement to lift an export denial order affecting Chinese telecommunications equipment company ZTE. The provision was not included in the final version, but section 889 does maintain a provision banning the federal government from purchasing equipment from certain Chinese vendors due to security concerns, including Huawei and ZTE, as well as any surveillance equipment for the purposes of national security from Dahua Technology, Hytera, and Hikvision.

Section 1286 requires the U.S. Defense Department to protect U.S. defense critical technologies research at U.S. academic institutions and publish a list of Chinese and Russian academic institutions involved in intellectual property theft, espionage, with military or intelligence connections, or operating malign foreign talent recruitment programs posting a threat to the U.S. national interest. Section 1091 prohibits the use of U.S. Defense Department funds for Chinese language instruction provided by Confucius Institutes.

== Legislative history ==
=== House vote ===
H.R.5515, the version of the NDAA 2019 which was reported by the House Armed Services Committee, was passed by the House of Representatives on July 26, 2018 in a 359–54 vote.

=== Senate vote ===
The Senate passed it on August 1, 2018 with a vote of 87–10.

=== Presidential signature ===
President Donald Trump signed the NDAA 2019 into law on August 13, 2018.

== Legal history ==
=== Section 889 ===
In March 2019, Huawei filed a lawsuit over the NDAA 2019 with the U.S. District Court for the Eastern District of Texas, alleging Section 889 to be unconstitutional because it specifically targeted Huawei without granting it a chance to provide a rebuttal or due process. The federal judge dismissed the lawsuit in February 2020, concluding that U.S. Congress acted within its powers by including the restriction in the NDAA 2019.

=== Section 8005 ===
Section 8005 of the NDAA 2019 became a key component of the legal conflict over allocation of funds for construction of the Mexico–United States barrier between the Trump administration, a coalition of several states, and several non-governmental organizations. After failing to have obtain funding for the wall from other appropriations bills by the end of 2019, Trump signed the National Emergency Concerning the Southern Border of the United States on February 15, 2019 to state that building the wall was a national emergency. He asserted that Section 8005 of the NDAA 2019, which states "[t]hat such authority to transfer may not be used unless for higher priority items, based on unforeseen military requirements, than those for which originally appropriated and in no case where the item for which funds are requested has been denied by the Congress", allowed him re-allocate about US$8 billion in funds from the Defense Department, including US$3.6 billion allocated for military construction and US$2.5 billion for drug rehab programs, to the Department of Homeland Security to construct the wall as an "unforeseen" requirement.

In February 2019, Sierra Club filed a legal action with the District Court for the Northern District of California, challenging the transfer of the funds. In June 2020, the United States Court of Appeals for the Ninth Circuit ruled that only Congress could approve such a transfer. Trump v. Sierra Club was accepted by the United States Supreme Court to be heard during the 2020-21 term.

In January 2021, Joe Biden became President of the United States. In July 2021, the Supreme Court granted the government's request and remanded the case to the Ninth Circuit Court to direct the District Court to vacate its judgments. The Supreme Court further instructed the District Court to “consider what further proceedings are necessary and appropriate in light of the changed circumstances in this case.”
