= Segundo Barrio =

Segundo Barrio may refer to:

- El Segundo Barrio in El Paso, Texas
- Second Ward, Houston, also known as Segundo Barrio
- Segundo (Ponce), one of the 31 barrios of Ponce, Puerto Rico
