= Fee (disambiguation) =

A fee is the price one pays as remuneration for rights or services.

Fee or fée may also refer to:

== Land tenure ==
- Fee (feudal tenure), or fief, fiefdom
- Fee simple, a form of estate in land in common law
- Fee tail, a tenure of an entailed estate in land
- Knight's fee, a fief large enough to support a knight

== People with the name ==
- Fee (surname), a surname of Irish origin
- Fei (surname) (simplified Chinese: 费; traditional Chinese: 費), also transliterated "Fee"
- Antoine Laurent Apollinaire Fée (1789–1874), French botanist
- Fee Malten (1911–2005), German actress
- Fee Waybill (born 1950), American musician

== Places ==
- F. E. Everett Turnpike (acronym FEE), a toll road in the U.S. state of New Hampshire
- Fee Glacier, in the Swiss Alps
- Lough Fee, County Galway, Ireland, a small lake
- Mount Fee, in British Columbia, Canada

== Arts, entertainment, and media ==
- Fee (band), a Christian rock/worship band
- "Fee Fi Fo", a song by Irish rock band The Cranberries
- Fee Fi Fo Yum, a British children's television game show presented by Les Dennis
- "Fee-fi-fo-fum", a line from the English fairy tale "Jack and the Beanstalk"
- La fée (The Fairy), a 2011 French-Belgian film

== Organizations ==
- Faculty of Electrical Engineering, Czech Technical University in Prague
- Faculty of Electronic Engineering, Menoufia University, in Egypt
- Fédération des Eclaireuses et Eclaireurs, a French scouting and guiding federation
- Forest Enterprise England
- Foundation for Economic Education, an American libertarian think tank
- Foundation for Environmental Education, an international environmental organization
- Free Education for Everyone, an Irish student campaign group

== Other uses ==
- Failure of exchange entitlements; see Theories of famines
- Fee de Marbourg, a breed of rabbit
- FEE method, in numerical analysis
- Front-end engineering
- La Fée Absinthe, a brand of absinthe

== See also ==
- Fe (disambiguation)
