= Biden v. Sierra Club =

- Supreme Court of the United States

Decided July 2, 2021
- Full case name: Joseph R. Biden, Jr., President of the United States, et al. v. Sierra Club et al.
- Docket no.: 20-138
- Citations: 594 U.S. ___ (more)

Case history
- Prior: Sierra Club v. Trump, 379 F. Supp. 3d 883 (N.D. Cal. 2019); affirmed, 963 F.3d 874 (9th Cir. 2020); California v. Trump, 379 F. Supp. 3d 928 (N.D. Cal. 2019); affirmed, 963 F.3d 926 (9th Cir. 2020); Cert. granted, Trump v. Sierra Club, 141 S. Ct. 618 (2020)

Questions presented
- 1. Whether respondents have a cognizable cause of action to obtain review of the Acting Secretary's compliance with Section 8005's proviso in transferring funds internally between DoD appropriations accounts.; 2. Whether the Acting Secretary exceeded his statutory authority under Section 8005 in making the transfers at issue.

Holding
- Motion to vacate is granted

Court membership
- Chief Justice John Roberts Associate Justices Clarence Thomas · Stephen Breyer; Samuel Alito · Sonia Sotomayor; Elena Kagan · Neil Gorsuch; Brett Kavanaugh · Amy Coney Barrett

Biden v. Sierra Club (previously captioned Trump v. Sierra Club) was a United States Supreme Court case involving the appropriation of funds used to expand the Mexico–United States border wall under the presidency of Donald Trump. Congress did not grant direct appropriations to fund expansion of the wall, leading Trump to sign the National Emergency Concerning the Southern Border of the United States in February 2019 which, citing his powers under the National Emergency Act, took approximately US$8 billion of funds appropriated to military spending towards construction of the wall. Numerous states and non-governmental organizations filed suit shortly after the order, resulting in a Ninth Circuit ruling that deemed the transfer of funds inappropriate under the Appropriations Clause and leading to the Supreme Court challenge.

Trump's successor, Joe Biden, terminated the national emergency and ceased wall construction, making the case moot. The Supreme Court vacated the ruling and remanded the case to lower courts for any potentially necessary further proceedings.

== Background ==
Portions of the U.S.–Mexico border have had barriers in place to restrict illegal crossings of immigrants from Mexico since 2006, though only about half of the 1,954 miles (3,145 km) border is barriered as of 2018. One of Donald Trump's presidential campaign pledges was to greatly expand and fortify the border wall to further restrict illegal immigration into the U.S. Shortly after his inauguration to office in January 2017, Trump issued Executive Order 13767 instructing the government to begin construction of the expanded wall, but as the Order lacked any funding directive, no such construction could begin.

By 2018, Trump sought direct funding for the border wall construction from Congress to be given to the Department of Homeland Security through appropriations bills, with an estimated US$18 billion required to complete full construction of the wall; this included 864 miles (1,390 km) of new wall and improvements to 1,163 miles (1,872 km) of existing structures. For the 2018 United States federal budget that passed in March 2018, while Trump had requested a first trunch of US$5.3 billion for construction for the wall, but only US$1.6 billion was allocated for primary and secondary fencing, barrier planning and design, and border security technology, but no wall construction. Trump had put pressure on Congress to pass the Build the Wall, Enforce the Law Act of 2018 which would have funded the full costs for construction and ongoing operations, but the bill failed to pass out of the House of Representatives following its change in leadership from Republican to Democratic after the 2018 elections.

As the 2019 United States federal budget was formulated, Trump again asked for US$5.7 billion for construction of the wall which the Senate had confirmed but the House refused to allocate, and Trump stated he would veto any budget without fund for the border wall. While parts of the budget were passed through the year, including the National Defense Authorization Act (NDAA) in August 2019, most other parts of the federal budget remained in limbo as the President and Congress engaged in partisan fighting over the border wall funding. This conflict was a major contributing factor to the 2018–19 government shutdown. By February 2019, both the House and Senate had come to a compromise position on the border wall, allocating about US$1.375 billion for a 55 miles (89 km) stretch of the border wall. While Trump signed the compromised budget and border wall bill to end the shutdown, he then announced his intentions to declare a national emergency as to evoke powers of the National Emergency Act and re-allocate funds to build the border wall.

=== National Emergency Order and subsequent lawsuits ===
Trump declared the National Emergency Concerning the Southern Border of the United States on February 15, 2019, two days after signing the 2019 budget into law. The order directed that about US$8 billion of previously allocated funds from Congress to departments within the Executive branch be re-allocated to construction of the border wall. This included US$3.6 billion from the Department of Defense's military construction, US$2.5 billion for the Department of Defense's drug interdiction activities, and US$600 million from the Treasury Department's forfeiture fund. In the case of the US$2.5 billion, Trump argued that Section 8005 of the 2019 Defense Appropriations Bill, which states "[t]hat such authority to transfer may not be used unless for higher priority items, based on unforeseen military requirements, than those for which originally appropriated and in no case where the item for which funds are requested has been denied by the Congress." allowed him to transfer funds from the Defense Department to the Department of Homeland Security for the building the border wall as an unforeseen requirement.

The order was immediately challenged in a number of cases. Two challenges were filed at the United States District Court of the Northern District of California; one led by a group of non-governmental organizations (NGOs) including the Sierra Club and the Southern Border Communities Coalition, represented by the American Civil Liberties Union, and a second by a coalition of 20 states led by California. Both suits challenged the re-appropriation of the US$2.5 billion of the Defense drug interdiction funds for wall construction as unconstitutional under the Appropriations Clause. Judge Haywood Gilliam presided over both cases.

Judge Gilliam issued a preliminary injunction in the Sierra Club case on May 24, 2019, blocking the use of the targeted funds for border wall construction on the basis that the plaintiff's challenge had a good chance of succeeding on the merits. Gilliam asserted that the re-appropriation of funds by Trump violated the separation of powers. Gilliam also stated that Trump's claim of being able to reallocate funds under the National Emergency Act for "unforeseen" events was belied since he had been asking for funding since 2018. Judge Gilliam's injunction was upheld on appeal to the United States Court of Appeals for the Ninth Circuit on July 3, 2019. The administration petitioned the Supreme Court to challenge the injunction, and in a 5–4 ruling issued July 26, 2019, put a stay on the injunction as litigation continued, on the basis that the plaintiffs in the case may not have standing to challenge Trump's order. In the intervening year, about 200 miles (320 km) of new border wall was constructed.

Judge Gilliam issued joint rulings on both cases on June 28, 2019, ruling against Trump's re-allocation of US$2.5 billion of Defense Department funds set by Congress. The administration appealed both cases to the Ninth Circuit.

The Ninth Circuit on review issued their ruling on both cases on June 26, 2020, finding in a 2–1 ruling in both that the re-appropriation of funds was unconstitutional violating the separation of powers. The Ninth also affirmed that the NGOs had standing in their suit as the ongoing wall construction was impacting the environment of which they had a vested interest in, and thus were damaged by it. As a result, the Sierra Club case plaintiffs petitioned the Supreme Court to reconsider their prior stay based on the findings of the Ninth Circuit in July 2020, but the Court declined to lift the stay in a 5–4 decision issued on July 31, 2020.

== Supreme Court ==
The Trump administration petitioned the Supreme Court challenging the Ninth Circuit decision of both the Sierra Club and the states' case, questing both the standing of the plaintiffs in the original suits, and the authority for the re-allocation of appropriated funds pursuant to Section 8005 of 2019 NDAA was lawful. The Supreme Court granted certiorari for the case on October 19, 2020, anticipating to be heard during the 2020–21 term.

After the Supreme Court's grant of certiorari, Joe Biden became President of the United States. Biden's early actions in office undid several of Trump's policies, among them those related to illegal immigration. This including formally abandoning the National Emergency that Trump has ordered, with Biden promising not to use any funds to build the wall. Oral arguments for Biden v. Sierra Club had been scheduled to be held in February 2021, but as a result of Biden's revocations, acting Solicitor General Elizabeth Prelogar requested the Supreme Court postpone them, which the Court agreed to.

Subsequently, in orders on July 2, 2021, the Supreme Court granted the government's request to vacate the ruling from the Ninth and remand the case there to determine if any further litigation was required.
