= National Emergency Concerning the Southern Border of the United States =

National Emergency declared by Donald Trump

The National Emergency Concerning the Southern Border of the United States (Proclamation 9844) was declared on February 15, 2019, by United States president Donald Trump during his first administration. Citing the National Emergencies Act, it ordered the diversion of billions of dollars of funds that had been appropriated to the U.S. Department of Defense for military construction. Trump declared the emergency after he signed, but derided, a bipartisan funding bill (passed by the House and the Senate a day before) containing border security funding without funding for the Mexico–United States border wall.

Trump had previously threatened to declare a national emergency if Congress did not pass his entire desired program for a wall on the United States–Mexican border by February 15, 2019. Under Proclamation 9844, the Trump administration intended to redirect $8 billion in previously agreed expenditure and to use the money to build the wall instead. Under Trump's plan, $3.6 billion assigned to military construction, $2.5 billion meant for the Department of Defense's drug interdiction activities, and $600 million from the Treasury's forfeiture fund would be diverted for wall construction. Trump's declaration was unprecedented in that none of the 58 previous emergency declarations made by U.S. presidents involved circumventing Congress to spend money it had expressly refused to authorize or allocate.

Trump's declaration of a national emergency was condemned by Democrats as unconstitutional; U.S. speaker of the House Nancy Pelosi and Senate Minority Leader Chuck Schumer called the declaration an affront to the rule of law that was "a lawless act, a gross abuse of the power of the presidency and a desperate attempt to distract from the fact that President Trump broke his core promise to have Mexico pay for his wall." Some Republicans also criticized Trump's declaration, fearing that circumventing Congress would set a dangerous precedent for the future. Congress passed a joint resolution to terminate the national emergency, but it was vetoed by Trump; this was his first veto.

Trump's declaration of a national emergency was immediately challenged in federal court, with California and sixteen other states suing the federal government on separation of powers grounds.

The Sierra Club and ACLU brought a similar suit. In 2019, a U.S. district court issued a preliminary injunction, and later a permanent injunction, in the Sierra Club suit, blocking Trump from diverting military funds for construction of a border wall. In July 2019, the Supreme Court, in a 5–4, one-paragraph ruling, overturned the lower court's ruling in Trump v. Sierra Club that blocked the use of funds to construct the border wall pending further legal proceedings; the Supreme Court majority found that the Sierra Club likely lacked legal standing.

In October 2019, in a separate case, a U.S. district court in Texas found that the El Paso County, Texas and the Border Network for Human Rights had legal standing to challenge Trump's attempt to divert $3.6 billion in military construction for wall construction along the Mexico border, and in December 2019, the court issued a permanent injunction blocking the attempted diversion of funds. The injunction was overturned in January 2020.

In a proclamation made on February 13, 2020, Trump extended Proclamation 9844 for an additional year; he repeated the one-year extension on January 15, 2021, just days before leaving office. However, Trump's successor, President Joe Biden, in one of his first official acts as president on January 20, 2021, terminated Trump's emergency declaration and paused work on the wall. On February 11, 2021, Biden wrote in a letter to Congress that the original declaration of national emergency had been "unwarranted" and that no more government funds would be used to build the wall, although he still used the remaining budget in 2023.

On January 20, 2025, the national emergency was reinstated by an executive order, by Donald Trump during his second administration.

== Background ==
=== Trump campaign and presidency ===
The Wall Street Journal reported the day of Trump's declaration that his action was the outcome of "two years of political neglect of his signature campaign promise, lost amid competing priorities and divisions within his administration," with no single administration official having been designated to champion funding of the border wall in Congress. Trump rejected a proposal in January 2018 that would have authorized $25 billion for wall construction in exchange for a path to citizenship for Dreamers, as well as a similar proposal the next month. In March, Congress approved a bill providing for $1.6 billion in barrier funding. Threatening to veto the bill, The Journal reported that Trump was surprised to learn that the $1.6 billion was the amount that had been requested in his budget. Trump's budget director Mick Mulvaney then privately advised the president to blame House speaker Paul Ryan for not seeking more funding. Tom Davis, an influential former Republican congressman, observed, "The mistake they made was not coming in right away and coming up with a plan. You wonder why they didn't try to jam this through when Republicans controlled the House because it's a lot more complicated now trying to convince Nancy Pelosi."

=== 2018–2019 government shutdown ===
Before Trump declared the national emergency, the United States had experienced a federal government shutdown, which ran from midnight EST on December 22, 2018, until January 25, 2019 (35 days). It was the longest U.S. government shutdown in history. It occurred when the United States Congress and President could not agree on an appropriations bill to fund the operations of the federal government for the 2019 fiscal year. The shutdown affected about one-fourth of government activities. It caused around 800,000 employees and 1 million federal contractors to be furloughed or obligated to work without pay. The shutdown was estimated by the Congressional Budget Office to cost the United States economy at least $11 billion. (Note: Excluding indirect costs that were difficult to quantify.)

The President had demanded that the appropriations bill include for $5.7 billion in federal funds for a proposed U.S.–Mexico border wall. In December 2018, the Republican-controlled Senate unanimously passed an appropriations bill without wall funding. However, Trump refused to support the bill, and it was therefore not considered by the Republican-controlled House.

By mid-January 2019, American opposition to the shutdown had become widespread. That month, representatives elected in November 2018 took office. The newly Democrat-controlled House approved the appropriations bill that had earlier passed the Senate unanimously. Trump said he would still veto any bill that did not fund an entire border wall. Republican Senate Majority Leader Mitch McConnell blocked the Senate from considering appropriations legislation that Trump would veto, including the bill that the Senate had earlier passed. Democrats and some Republicans passed multiple bills attempting to reopen the government.

On January 25, 2019, Trump agreed to endorse a stopgap bill to reopen the government until February 15. However, he reiterated his demand for the border wall funding and said he would shut down the government again or declare a national emergency and use military funding to build the wall if Congress did not appropriate the funds by February 15.

On February 14, the House and Senate passed an appropriations bill funding the government until September 30, the end of the fiscal year 2019. Trump signed the bill into law the following day. The bill includes US$1.375 billion to construct new fencing on 55 miles (89 km) of the Mexico–United States border.

== Announcement ==
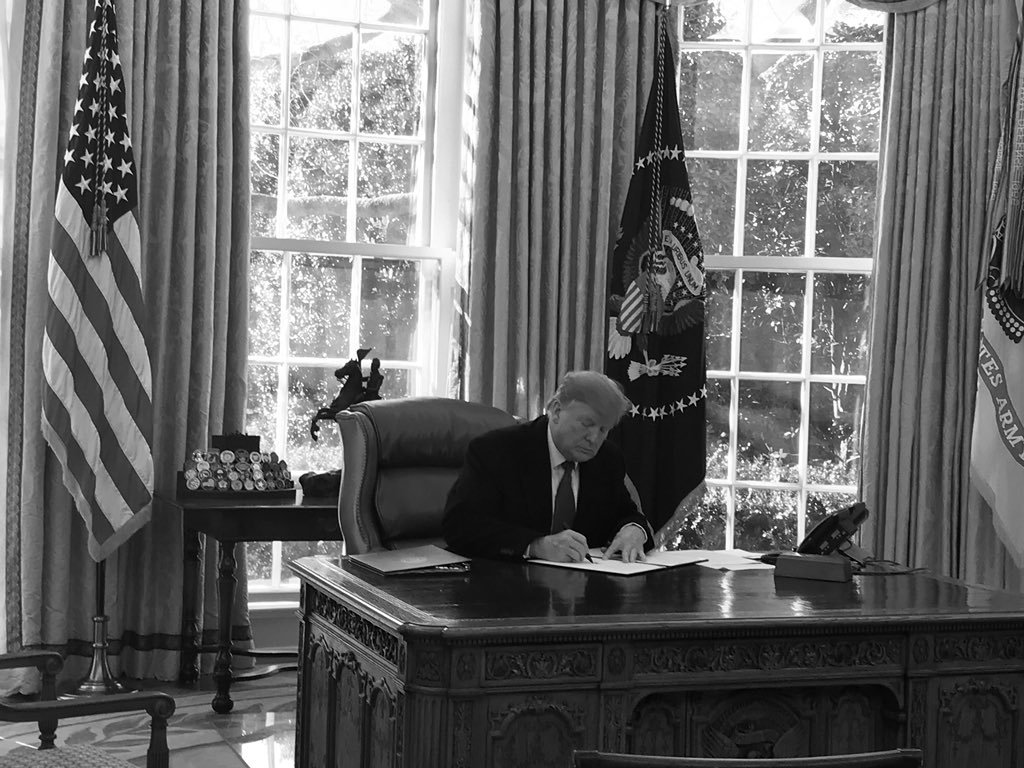
President Trump signed a declaration of national emergency on February 15, 2019.

On February 15, 2019, President Trump spoke to the media in the White House Rose Garden. After signing the spending bill to keep the government open, Trump declared a national emergency over the border crisis, hoping to get access to $8 billion to use for border security. During his announcement, Trump stated, "I could do the wall over a longer period of time. I didn't need to do this, but I'd rather do it much faster." Critics asserted this statement would undercut the rationale for his emergency declaration in court challenges.

=== Funding ===
To obtain $8 billion for border wall construction, the Trump administration proposed augmenting the earlier February 14 $1.375 billion appropriations bill by diverting other previously allocated monies: $3.6 billion for military construction, $2.5 billion for the Department of Defense's counter-drug activities, and $600 million from Treasury's drug-asset forfeiture funds. White House officials said that the national emergency specifically enabled the $3.6 billion military diversion while the $2.5 billion from Defense and the $600 million from Treasury were possible due to "presidential discretion".

This was the first time since the September 11 attacks in 2001 that an emergency declaration authorized military action.

Roll Call reported on February 21, 2019, that over one-third of the funds the Trump administration had identified for diversion had already been spent by the Department of Defense. In March 2019 the Pentagon issued a list of proposed military construction projects which could be postponed, under the president's emergency declaration, so that their funding could be diverted to build the wall. The Pentagon authorized up to $1 billion to be transferred to the Army Corps of Engineers for construction of additional barriers.

== Legislative action to overturn and presidential veto ==
Under the national emergency legislation, Congress can overturn a declaration of emergency legislatively. If the House passes a privileged resolution to overturn, the Senate is required to take up the resolution within eighteen days. If the Senate passes the resolution, by a simple majority vote, the bill goes to the president, who has the option of vetoing it. Congress can override the veto by a two-thirds vote in both houses.

House speaker Nancy Pelosi announced on February 20, 2019, that Democrats would introduce such a resolution in two days. The measure, House Joint Resolution 46, stated: "Resolved by the Senate and House of Representatives of the United States of America in Congress assembled, That, pursuant to section 202 of the National Emergencies Act (50 U.S.C. 1622), the national emergency declared by the finding of the President on February 15, 2019, in Proclamation 9844 (84 Fed. Reg. 4949) is hereby terminated."

The House voted to approve the bill on February 27 by a vote of 245–182, with thirteen Republicans voting in favor. On March 3, Rand Paul became the fourth Republican senator to declare he would vote for the resolution, improving the chances of passage. The next day he asserted that "at least" ten other Republican senators told him they would also vote for the resolution. On March 14, the Senate voted 59–41 to support the bill to overturn Trump's emergency declaration, with twelve Republicans voting in favor.

On March 15, 2019, Trump vetoed the Joint Resolution, calling it "reckless" at a signing ceremony where he signed the veto statement, flanked by members of the Cabinet and law enforcement officials. Pelosi responded by scheduling a vote to override the veto on March 26, 2019. There were 248 votes to override the president's veto, and 181 votes against, which fell short of the two-thirds supermajority (286 votes) needed to override.

A second attempt to overturn the emergency failed in October 2019, when the Senate failed to override a Presidential veto by a vote of 53–36.

== Legal challenges and injunctions ==
Sixteen U.S. states (shown) jointly filed a lawsuit against the Trump administration three days after the emergency declaration.

In his statement declaring the emergency, President Trump acknowledged the inevitability of legal challenges, stating that he anticipated losing in lower courts, but ultimately prevailing in the Supreme Court. The lawsuits are expected to revolve around different issues such as property rights, tribal sovereignty, and the limits of the presidency. Similar court cases challenging the Secure Fence Act of 2006 still remain open over a decade later.

As of February 22, 2019, at least six separate lawsuits have been filed. Three lawsuits were filed within days of the announcement of the declaration: El Paso County, Texas filed a lawsuit in the Western District of Texas in concert with the Border Network for Human Rights, Protect Democracy, and the Niskanen Center; Public Citizen sued on behalf of the Frontera Audubon Society and three Texan landowners; and the Citizens for Responsibility and Ethics in Washington filed a lawsuit against the Department of Justice in a case involving a FOIA request.

=== Suits by Sierra Club and 16 states ===
Two separate lawsuits were filed in the United States District Court for the Northern District of California shortly after the order was signed. The first, filed on February 18, 2019, was from sixteen U.S. states led by California (Note: California, Colorado, Connecticut, Delaware, Hawaii, Illinois, Maine, Maryland, Michigan, Minnesota, Nevada, New Jersey, New Mexico, New York, Oregon, and Virginia) challenging the declaration. The lawsuit asserted that Trump's executive order diverting funds appropriated by Congress from the Department of Defense to the other agencies responsible for the wall's construction violated the Appropriations Clause of Article One of the United States Constitution, limiting this as a Congressional power. On December 11, 2019, Judge Haywood Gilliam Jr. ruled that the executive order allocating the US$6.7 billion in funds violated the Appropriations Clause, stating that the executive order attempted to obtain the funds for the same project but labeled under a Defense project that Trump had been unable to obtain from Congress when it was a civilian project under the Department of Homeland Security.

The second suit was filed on February 19, 2018, by the ACLU on behalf of the Sierra Club, the Southern Border Communities Coalition, and other interested organizations and people. Judge Gilliam, who also heard this case, issued a temporary injunction on May 24, 2019, blocking the Trump administration's plan to divert funds not explicitly appropriated by Congress. Gilliam wrote that "Congress's 'absolute' control over federal expenditures—even when that control may frustrate the desires of the Executive Branch regarding initiatives it views as important—is not a bug in our constitutional system. It is a feature of that system, and an essential one." In June 2019, this injunction was converted into a permanent injunction. In July 2019, the U.S. Court of Appeals for the Ninth Circuit upheld the injunction. On July 26, 2019, the Supreme Court issued a stay to Gilliam's ruling, allowing wall construction to proceed while litigation continues.

In June 2020, the Ninth Circuit affirmed Gilliam's ruling in both the states' and the Sierra Club's cases, ruling that the reappropriation of funds was unlawful. Trump petitioned the ruling to the Supreme Court, which had certified the case to hear during the 2020–21 term, though separately refused to lift the stay on the permanent injunction towards ongoing construction despite the Ninth's ruling.

=== Suit by El Paso County and Border Network for Human Rights ===
In October 2019, in a separate case, U.S. District Judge David Briones of the U.S. District Court for the Western District of Texas found that the El Paso County, Texas and the Border Network for Human Rights had legal standing to challenge Trump's attempt to divert $3.6 billion in military construction for wall construction along the Mexico border, and in December 2019, the court issued a permanent injunction blocking the attempted diversion of funds. The ruling did not effect the use of other funds that the Trump administration designed for wall construction, such as counter-drug and Treasury Forfeiture Funds.

In January 2020, a panel of the U.S. Court of Appeals for the Fifth Circuit, in a 2–1 decision, issued a temporary stay of the injunction pending further appellate proceedings. The panel split along ideological lines: the two Republican-appointed judges (Edith Jones and Andrew A. Oldham) voted to issue the temporary stay, while the panel's only Democratic appointee, Stephen A. Higginson, dissented.

=== Other actions ===
In June 2019, U.S. District Judge Trevor N. McFadden denied a request by the U.S. House of Representatives to temporarily block spending on the wall. The House claimed in its lawsuit that the Trump administration was overstepping its authority, and sought to prevent it from spending over a billion dollars it had already transferred from military pay and pension accounts, and more funds from an emergency military construction fund that had not yet been transferred. McFadden, a Trump appointee, said the House had no legal standing to sue the president and that therefore the Court lacked jurisdiction to hear the claim. McFadden issued no opinion on the merits of the case, saying "The Court declines to take sides in this fight between the House and the President."

In February 2019, the Center for Biological Diversity, Defenders of Wildlife, and the Animal Legal Defense Fund filed a lawsuit in Washington D.C.

The Tohono O'odham Nation has raised the issue with the Organization of American States' Inter-American Commission on Human Rights, and the Cocopah, Kickapoo, and Kumeyaay are also considering their legal options.

== Reinstatement in second administration ==
US southwest border encounters decreased with Trump's second term.

On January 20, 2025, the national emergency was reinstated by an executive order, by Donald Trump during his second administration.

== Reactions ==
Some analysts stated that if legally upheld, the declaration would vastly expand governmental power, particularly that of the presidency and the executive branch. Reporter Charlie Savage summarized the political impact of the declaration, saying that "no matter what else happens, Mr. Trump's willingness to invoke emergency powers to circumvent Congress is likely to go down as an extraordinary violation of constitutional norms—setting a precedent that future presidents of both parties may emulate to unilaterally achieve their own policy goals."

A number of legal scholars called the declaration an "abuse" and a "deliberate misapplication" of the National Emergencies Act, with many stating that the declaration threatened the separation of powers in the United States and amounted to a potential constitutional crisis. They said the declaration was a continuation of the expansion of presidential power observed during the 2010s in the United States.

Thousands reportedly participated in a nationwide Presidents Day protest on February 18, 2019, to denounce the emergency declaration.

On February 25, a bipartisan group of 58 former senior national security officials and 25 former Republican lawmakers implored Congress to overturn Trump's emergency declaration. The former lawmakers wrote, "It has always been a Republican fundamental principle that no matter how strong our policy preferences, no matter how deep our loyalties to presidents or party leaders, in order to remain a constitutional republic we must act within the borders of the Constitution," while the security officials contended that there is no "documented terrorist or national security emergency at the southern border" nor an "emergency related to violent crime."

=== Congress ===
==== Republicans ====
Support from Republicans has been divided, with most conservative House Republicans embracing Trump's action, while opposition was more pronounced among Senate Republicans. Reportedly, because of Trump's high approval ratings among Republicans, many in the party were concerned that expressing public opposition to the president's action could result in their political demise. An analysis by FiveThirtyEight found that through February 18, 2019, 34% of the 53 Republican Senators had expressed support for the declaration.

Before the declaration, Senate Majority Leader Mitch McConnell—long a defender of Senate prerogatives—and most other Senate Republicans strongly urged the president to not take the action. After the declaration, McConnell led several other senators in pivoting to support it. Senator Lindsey Graham expressed emphatic support for the declaration. Georgia Senator Johnny Isakson said he "support[s] the president in his decision," and Richard Shelby said Trump has "the power to defend the country, to defend the borders." Senator John Hoeven stated that Republicans "support the president's efforts to strengthen border security," and Senator Kevin Cramer said that Trump "will address the crisis at the southern border, whether or not Congress does." Representative Matt Gaetz stated that he was "proud" of Trump.

Others, including Senators Rand Paul, Chuck Grassley, and Marco Rubio, spoke out strongly against the declaration. Susan Collins said the president is "usurping congressional authority" while Lamar Alexander said the United States' "founders chose not to create a chief executive with the power to tax the people and spend their money any way he chooses." Representative Justin Amash stated that Trump is "attempting to circumvent our constitutional system".

Will Hurd, the only Republican representative for a district along the southern border, said that the national emergency declaration "is not a tool that the president needs in order to solve this problem," and argued that a coherent strategy with increased manpower and technology at the border would be the solution.

==== Democrats ====
Shortly before the emergency was declared, Speaker of the House Nancy Pelosi warned Republicans that this would set a precedent for the next Democratic president to declare a national emergency on gun violence. After the declaration, Pelosi and Senate Minority Leader Senator Chuck Schumer issued a joint statement opposing the declaration. Pelosi and Schumer described the declaration as an affront to the rule of law, "a lawless act, a gross abuse of the power of the presidency and a desperate attempt to distract from the fact that President Trump broke his core promise to have Mexico pay for his wall." The Democratic leaders' statement said that Trump was trying to "shred the Constitution" and vowed to seek "every remedy available" to block it.

Senator Angus King, an independent who caucuses with the Democrats, called the move "antithetical to our American system of government." Senator Tina Smith, a member of the Minnesota Democratic–Farmer–Labor Party, said the declaration was an "attempt at a power grab."

The House Judiciary Committee announced an "immediate investigation", summoning Department of Justice officials and White House Counsel Pat Cipollone to congressional hearings and requesting various documents from the White House.

=== Commentators ===
A number of media commentators considered the declaration a threat to the "integrity" of American democracy.

Many prominent Republican and conservative commentators expressed concerns that the declaration violated the separation of powers and the powers of Congress. Noted neoconservative and long time Trump-critic Max Boot argued in the Washington Post that the action was Trump's "latest assault on the norms of American democracy" and that "arguably nothing Trump has done to date has been as alarming as his misuse of the 1976 National Emergencies Act." and would set a precedent to allow a future Democratic president to declare an emergency taking unilateral action on gun control and climate change.

Ann Coulter, an early Trump supporter and now frequent critic of the president sharply criticized the move, stating "the goal of a national emergency is for Trump to scam the stupidest people in his base for 2 more years" and that "[t]he only national emergency is that our president is an idiot."

Noting that there will be legal challenges to the action, many commentators also predicted that Trump's own comments during his announcement will make it harder to support his claim that there is an actual emergency. However, conservative radio host Hugh Hewitt said he thought the president had a "good shot at winning" in the Supreme Court.

=== Academics ===
Some legal scholars considered the declaration of a national emergency as an example of executive overreach and an abuse of the National Emergencies Act, arguing that the declaration would permanently and vastly expand the power of the presidency and the executive branch.

Andrew Boyle of the Brennan Center for Justice's Liberty & National Security Program said that the National Emergencies Act was broadly worded, providing much flexibility to the executive in many areas, including "control over the military and construction projects." Boyle predicted that lawsuits challenging an emergency declaration would focus on issues such as whether building the wall was of "military necessity." Boyle stated that historically, presidents had abused states of emergency "with the tacit consent of the legislature." Boyle suggested that since Trump "has a history of blowing through norms that other executives have adhered to" Congress might begin to revisit its historical assumption that the executive was acting in good faith.

Presidential historian Douglas Brinkley said of the declaration: "It shrinks the importance of Congress even more. It is a wild-eyed imperial presidency."

=== Chapel property ===
In February 2019, Congress amended an existing appropriations bill to protect several sites along the border, including the historic La Lomita Chapel in Mission, Texas. Trump's declaration of a national emergency could have removed those protections. The local pastor, Roy Snipes, and his bishop, Daniel E. Flores, opposed the plan to use church property for the wall, and the Brownsville diocese has challenged it in court. The Georgetown University Law Center's Institute for Constitutional Advocacy and Protection (ICAP) filed a brief in support of the diocese. In a show of support for the chapel, over a thousand parishioners held a procession on Palm Sunday, April 14, 2019, from Our Lady of Guadalupe Church to the chapel.

=== Public opinion ===
A majority of Americans disapproved of Trump's emergency declaration. Three national surveys in February 2019 showed that between 51% and 61% of Americans opposed the declaration, with between 36% and 39% supporting it. These figures generally reflected Trump's overall presidential approval ratings. Support and opposition was highly polarized by political party: in a Marist Poll, 94% of Democrats and 62% of independents, but only 12% of Republicans, disapproved of Trump's declaration of a national emergency to build a wall.

== See also ==
- Immigration reform in the United States
- List of national emergencies in the United States
