= Lxs Dos =

Mexican-American street art duo

Lxs Dos (or Los Dos) are a transborder collaborative duo of visual artists based in the cities of El Paso, Texas, U.S. and Ciudad Juárez, Chihuahua, Mexico. The husband and wife duo are Ramon Cardenas, a Filipino-American, and Christian Cardenas, a Mexican-American from Juárez. Their work is mainly community-based and they are predominantly known for their public murals among other public art commissions in the U.S. and Mexico.

== Biographies ==
Christian was born and raised in Ciudad Juárez and grew up painting. In 2013, Christian received her Bachelor of Fine Arts in Graphic Design from the University of Texas at El Paso. She also went to Universidad Iberoamericana Puebla to study Textile Design.

Ramon was born and raised in the Philippines. Prior to co-creating Lxs Dos, he was a DJ and had not formally attended an art school. In 2022, he received his Bachelor of Arts in Art History and Museum Studies from the University of Texas at El Paso to "create opportunities for BIPOC (Black, Indigenous, People of Color), AAPI (Asian American and Pacific Islander), LGBTQ+, and other artists who have been historically underrepresented and exploited in museums, galleries, and art history." After participating in the Smithsonian's Latino Museum Studies Program in 2022, he began his role as Assistant Curator of Practice for the Stanlee & Gerald Rubin Center for the Visual Arts.

== Work ==
Lxs Dos started collaborating by circulating posters and stickers within the El Paso and Juárez transborder area before moving onto larger scale projects in the 2010s. In 2015, the El Paso's Museum and Cultural Affairs Department funded Make Shift to promote community-based, Mexican-American cultural murals that represented the day-to-day lives of El Segundo Barrio residents, a historical neighborhood in El Paso. From Make Shift, Lxs Dos created their most well known mural, Sister Cities/Ciudades Hermanas. Reminiscent of Frida Kahlo's The Two Fridas, the mural is regarded by the artists and critics to be a symbol of unity across the U.S.-Mexican border, an homage to the flow of people crossing the border back and forth, and the women of Juárez. Sister Cities/Ciudades Hermanas is also the cover of the academic text, Exploring the Transnational Neighbourhood: Perspectives on Community-Building, Identity and Belonging, which features a chapter dedicated to analyzing Sister Cities/Ciudades Hermanas's homage to U.S.-Mexico transnationalism.

Their artwork typically spotlights historically marginalized working-class, migrant people from the U.S.-Mexico border. Works like Operation Hold the Line highlight the tensions between immigrants crossing the U.S.-Mexico border and U.S. law enforcement over the body of a dark-skinned woman.

=== Community involvement ===
Lxs Dos have also been outspoken advocates in the local El Paso/Juárez artistic community, denouncing censorship in their work when trying to depict authentic representations of the borderlands. From June 26 to June 30, 2017, Lxs Dos hosted a community art workshops for middle and high school students in El Paso titled "Move Your Mind! Understanding Migration and Immigration Through the Arts" as part of their University of Texas at El Paso exhibition, "LxsDos: Pásele, Pásele."

=== Other notable art ===
==== Book covers ====
- Feathered Serpent, Dark Heart of Sky by David Bowles
- Coatlicue Girl by Gris Muñoz

==== Sculptures ====
- La Guardiana is a protector of immigrants, commissioned by Rage Against the Machine. It was installed at Coachella 2022.
