= 2019 Presidents Day protest =

Anti-Trump protest

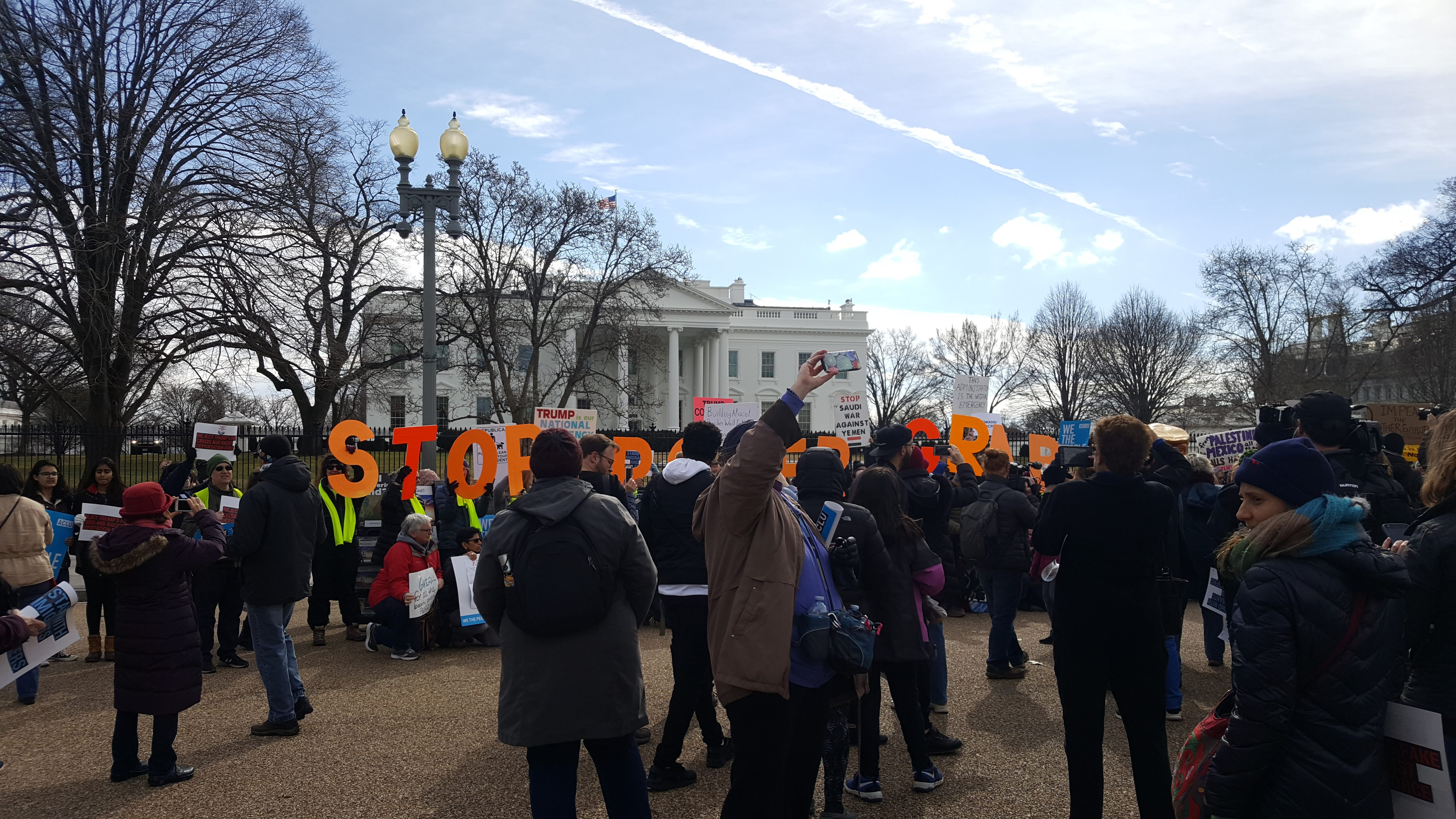
- Presidents Day protest outside the White House. A "Stop Power Grab" sign can be seen
- Date: February 18, 2019
- Location: United States
- Type: Demonstrations
- Cause: Opposition to President Donald Trump's national emergency declaration

Demonstrations were held throughout the United States on Presidents Day, February 18, 2019, in protest of President Donald Trump's declaration of a national emergency to construct a new wall extending the barrier along the southern border. Because schools were closed on Presidents Day, many young people were able to participate.

== Locations ==
Thousands participated across the United States. Some rallies were organized by MoveOn. The reported number of events has varied. According to Pacific Standard, more than 140 events were planned, per a website operated by MoveOn. Bloomberg reported that MoveOn claimed 175 events were planned in 41 states, and HuffPost said the organization claimed more than 260 events were organized in 48 states.

=== Northeast ===
In Connecticut, events were organized in New Haven, Norwalk, and Pomfret. Protesters gathered outside Congresswoman Rosa DeLauro's office in downtown New Haven. More than 60 protesters assembled on the Stroffolino Bridge, which connects East and South Norwalk, including members of Huddle CT, Indivisible CT, MoveOn, and the ReSisters. Two counter-protesters were present, but the demonstration remained civil.

In New Hampshire, a protest was planned in Portsmouth.

New Jersey saw demonstrations in Newark, Princeton, and Red Bank.

New York saw events in Brighton, New York City, and Utica. Events were also planned in Binghamton, Geneseo, and Ithaca, as well as Beacon, New Paltz, and Rhinebeck.

Pennsylvania saw demonstrations in several cities, including Philadelphia, Pittsburgh, Reading, and West Chester. Dozens of protesters gathered in front of the Pittsburgh City-County Building. Mayor Bill Peduto and state Rep. Edward Gainey (D-24th District) spoke to attendees. Approximately 30 people in Reading assembled outside U.S. Rep. Chrissy Houlahan's office, demanding she not support wall funding. In West Chester, Mayor Dianne Herrin spoke to an estimated 75 to 100 demonstrators gathered at East Goshen Park's Veterans Memorial Pavilion.

In Rhode Island, dozens protested in Providence.

In Vermont, an event was planned in Brattleboro.

==== Maine ====
In Maine, activities were planned in the following cities:

- Augusta (Western Avenue)
- Bangor
- Bar Harbor
- Brunswick (Town Green)
- Lewiston (Dufresne Park)
- Portland

==== Massachusetts ====
On a snowy afternoon in Cambridge, US Rep Ayanna Pressley spoke before a crowd of 150 people at the Harvard Square Subway Kiosk; she would later arrive at a Boston event near JFK Federal Building, where hundreds more rallied. Meanwhile, at Falmouth Town Green, a group of 50 protesters were given a counter-protest greeting in the form of speeding snow plow truck, twice splattering them with icy slush.

Other cities in Massachusetts saw demonstrations:

- Andover
- Fall River
- Greenfield
- Haverhill
- Newburyport
- Northampton
- Springfield
- Sudbury
- Waltham
- Worcester

=== Midwest ===
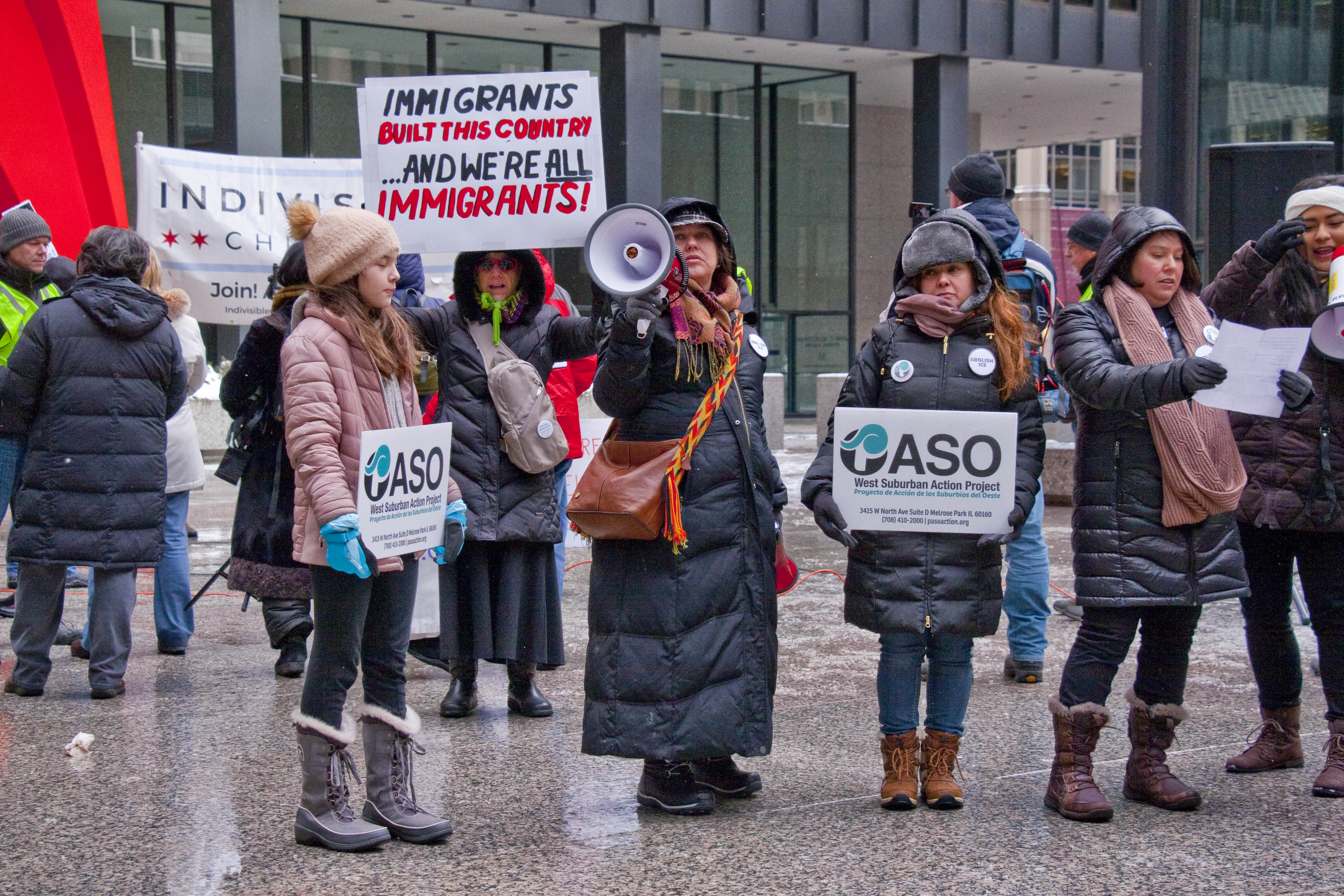
Protest in Chicago against the declaration of national emergency

Illinois saw protests in Carbondale, Champaign, Chicago, and Peoria. The Carbondale event was organized by Indivisible Shawnee (formerly Indivisible Carbondale). Approximately one dozen demonstrators gathered outside the Hunter Building, where Congressman Mike Bost has an office. The Chicago event, hosted by Indivisible Chicago, saw hundreds of people gather at Federal Plaza. In Peoria, approximately 50 demonstrators assembled outside the Federal Courthouse. The protest, described by Journal Star's Scott Hilyard as "animated", was organized by Indivisible Peoria Area. Events were also planned in Crystal Lake, Frankfort, Libertyville, Mount Prospect, and Naperville.

In Indiana, a protest was held in downtown South Bend, outside the office of Senator Mike Braun. The demonstration was organized by The Indivisible Project.

Minnesota saw a demonstration in Rochester, organized by a local MoveOn supporter.

==== Michigan ====
Michigan saw demonstrations in Ann Arbor, Lansing, and Metro Detroit (including Ferndale). Approximately 60 protesters, mostly Ann Arbor residents and University of Michigan students, gathered outside the city's Federal Building, where U.S. Rep. Debbie Dingell has an office. The event, organized by Stop Trump Ann Arbor over three days, featured speakers by organizers and an hour-long march along Liberty Street. The Lansing protest was held at the First Presbyterian Church. Hundreds protested in Metro Detroit. As many as 70 people attended in Ferndale, organized by Indivisible Fighting 9, an Indivisible affiliate covering Michigan's 9th and 11th congressional districts.

There were plans to hold demonstrations at Detroit's Wayne State University, outside Howell's Old Courthouse, and in the cities of Wyoming and Ypsilanti.

==== Ohio ====
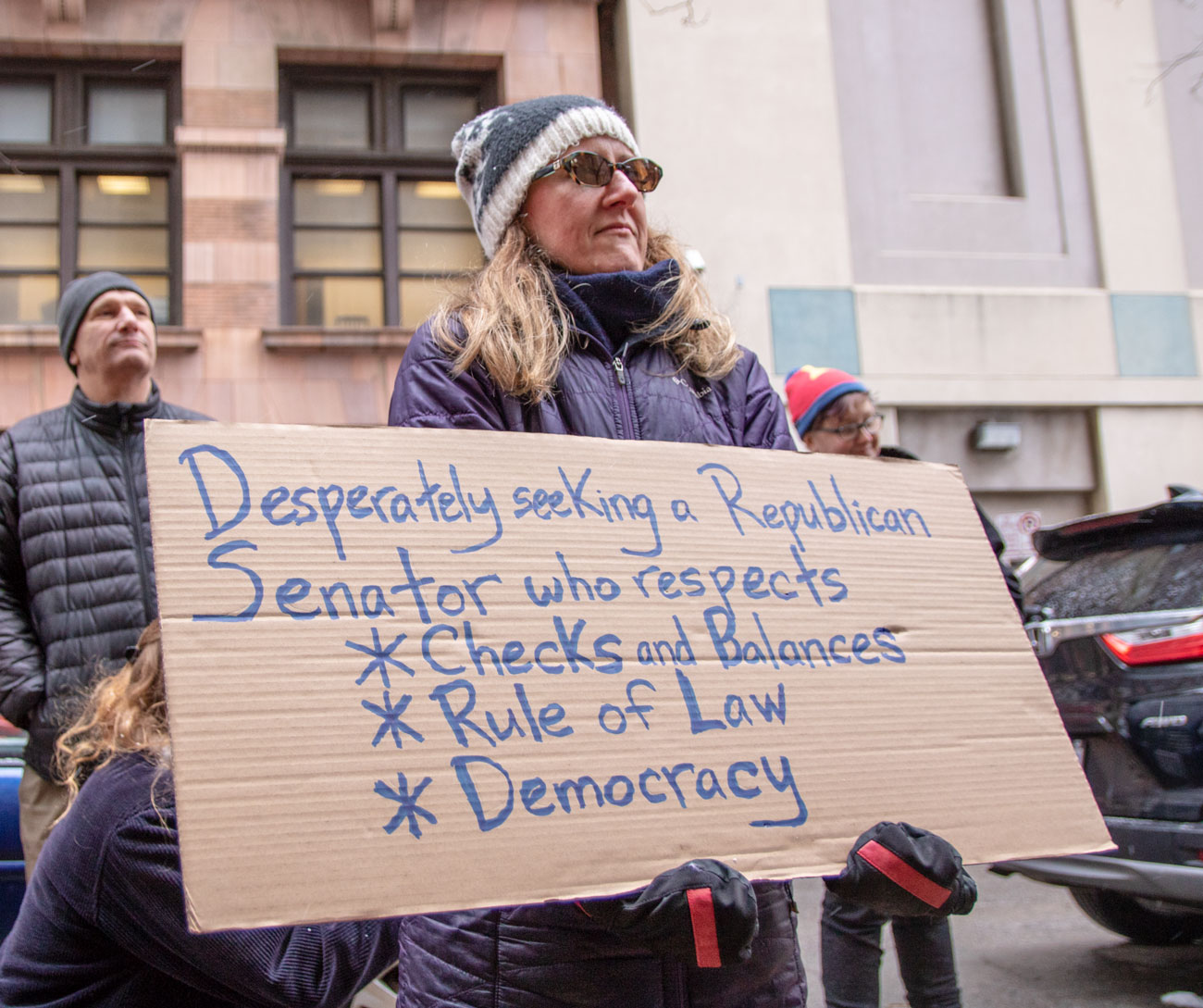
Demonstration in Columbus, Ohio

In Ohio, demonstrations were held in Cincinnati, Columbus, Dayton, North Canton, Warren, and Westerville. Protesters in Cincinnati marched along Gardfield Place, and were met with at least one counter-protester. Demonstrators in downtown Columbus gathered outside LeVeque Tower, which houses an Immigration and Customs Enforcement (ICE) office, and across the street from U.S. Senator Rob Portman's office. The Columbus protests were organized by activists and leaders of religious groups. Dayton protesters gathered outside the office of Congressman Mike Turner. Approximately 30 people gathered at North Canton's Bitzer Park for an event billed as the "Presidents Day Protest to Fight Trump's Fake Crisis and Racist Deportation Forces". The protest was organized by the head of Stark Indivisible. The demonstration in downtown Warren was sponsored by several groups, including the Jefferson Democratic Coalition, the Mahoning/Trumbull Democratic County Women's Caucus, and Valley Voice United for Change. State Senator Tina Maharath spoke at the Westerville protest.

=== South ===
In Delaware, an event was held in Wilmington's Rodney Square.

Florida saw a demonstration organized at the Florida International University, in the Miami metropolitan area.

In Georgia, a protest was held in Atlanta. The event took place outside the U.S. Immigration and Customs Enforcement offices, and was organized by Georgia Alliance for Social Justice.

Maryland saw events in Bel Air (Harford County), Columbia, Rockville (Courthouse Square), and Salisbury.

Virginia saw demonstrations in Charlottesville, Norfolk, Roanoke, and Williamsburg.

==== Washington, D.C. ====
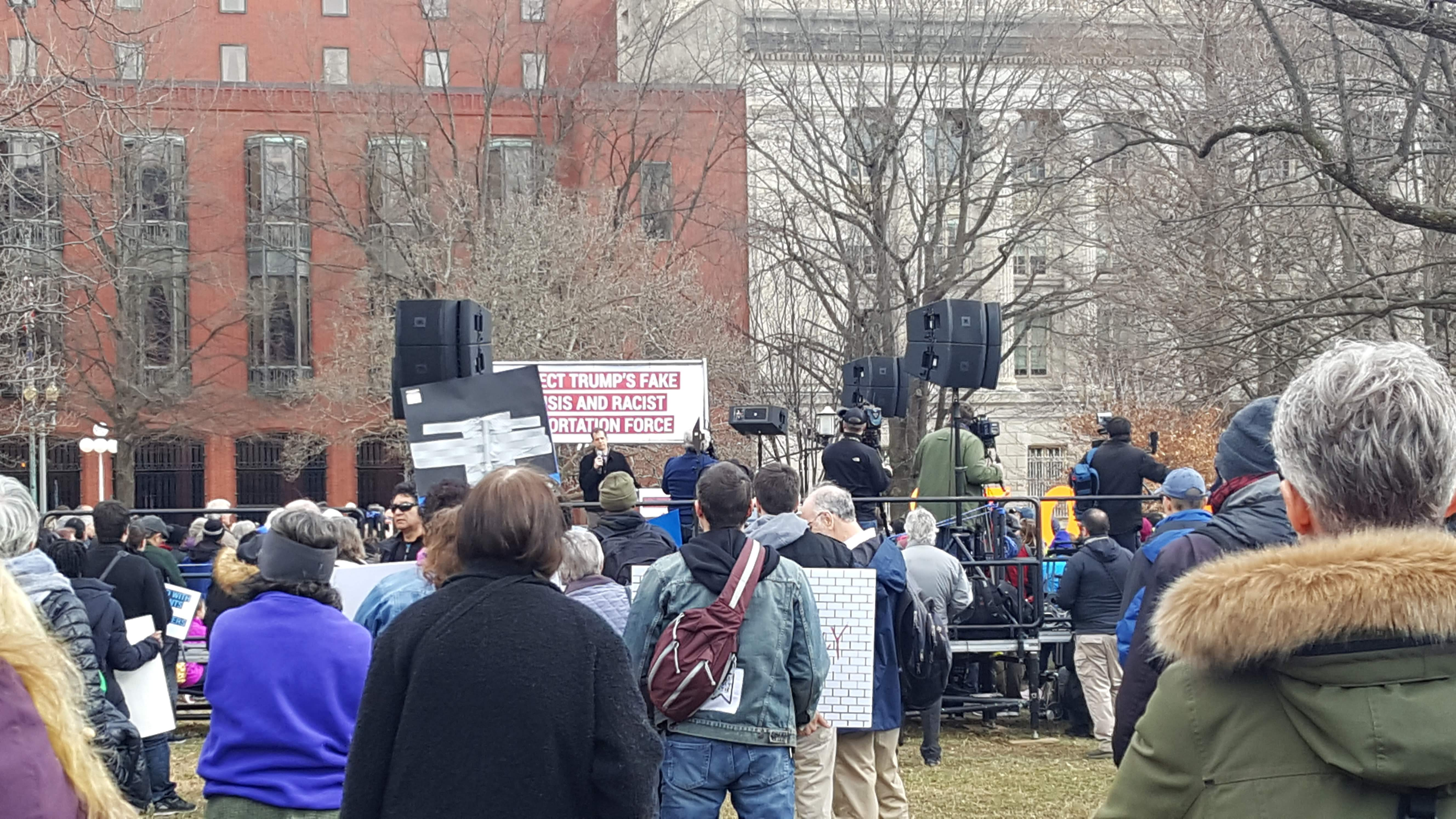
Protest at Lafayette Square in Washington, D.C.

In Washington, D.C., protesters gathered in Lafayette Square, by the White House, moving to next to the White House's northern fence as the event came to a close. The American Civil Liberties Union was represented at the demonstration.

==== Texas ====
2019 Presidents Day protest (Texas)

Texas saw activities in Austin (Republic Square), Fort Worth (Tarrant County Courthouse), Houston, McAllen, San Antonio, and Sherman.

=== West ===
An event was organized in Tucson, Arizona.

In Colorado, events were held in Colorado Springs and Denver.

A protest was held in Boise, and another was planned in Idaho Falls, Idaho.

Oregon saw demonstrations in Eugene, Portland, and Silverton. Approximately 100 people gathered outside the Wayne Lyman Morse United States Courthouse in downtown Eugene. Hundreds assembled in downtown Portland's Tom McCall Waterfront Park. The "Not My President" protest was organized by various groups, including Occupy ICE. The rally began with a sketch in which men dressed as ICE agents separated a family. In response to the demonstration, the Oregon Republican Party said, "It was called a crisis at the border during the Obama Presidency in 2014, and it's an even bigger crisis now. Since it's a crisis, it is an emergency for a President like Donald Trump who takes seriously his highest duty, which is to protect the sovereignty and security of the American people under the law." Silverton's event was held at Town Square Park.

==== California ====
2019 Presidents Day protest (California)

California saw events organized in the following cities:

- Los Angeles
- Oakland (Merritt College)
- Palm Springs
- Pasadena
- San Diego
- San Francisco
- San Jose
- Simi Valley
- Ventura
- Walnut Creek
- Watsonville
- Woodland (Yolo County Courthouse)

==== Washington ====
Washington state saw events in Longview, Olympia, Port Townsend, Seattle (Volunteer Park), Spokane, Vancouver, and Wenatchee. The Longview event was held at Civic Circle. Hundreds attended the protest at Vancouver's Esther Short Park.
