= Fee de Marbourg =

Breed of rabbit

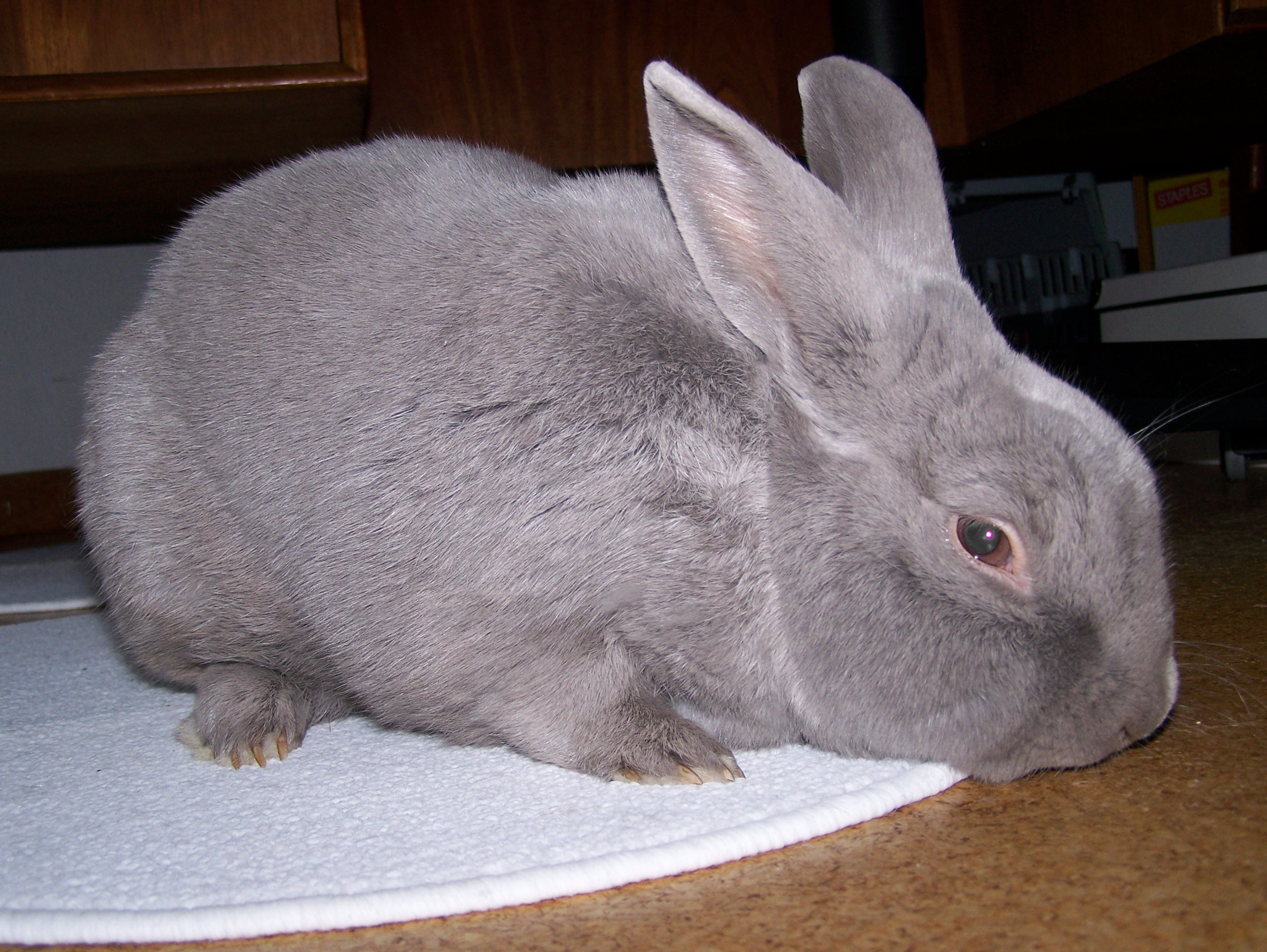

The Fee de Marbourg is a breed of rabbit that originated in Germany where it became known as the Fee de Marbourg, literally "Fairy from Marbourg." The British Rabbit Council recognizes this breed as the Marburger Fee and in the UK it is sometimes referred to as the Marburger.

This is a medium-sized rabbit, almost lilac, sometimes pinkish in color, with the Havana breed in its heritage.

== History ==
F. Joppich, a German man who was a prominent figure in rabbit-breeding, had written a book titled, "Unsere Kaninchenrassen," (Our Rabbit Breeds) that he himself often discovered at the beginning of the century, the presence of light-colored rabbits in some litters, among rabbits breeders. Judges would consider this color as faulty and systematically eliminated these subjects in breeding shows.

In 1912, Marie Sandemann offered a young rabbit with the 'wrong' color born in a range of Havana rabbit to the concierge of a school attended by her nephew, L. Peter. Marie Sandemann, who also had a Havana, raised it to adulthood and bred it with a silvery male. The whole litter of Sandemann's rabbit and the silver male was black, and the original Havana mother had died when the offspring were ten weeks old. Sandemann later selected a black female from the litter that she breed with another male Havana rabbit. The descendants of these rabbits consisted mainly of black and silver. After some time, the first subject was a young male had the desired lilac-pink-like hue.

She exhibited her first "Fairy" rabbits in 1915 at the group exhibition in Limbach at der Lahn. These rabbits of plain lilac pink hue, covered with a light russet veil, aroused considerable interest.

Extremely impressed, the judge of the exhibition, Judge Kemp, who had appraised these rabbits, pledged to support this new creation for recognition by the Federation of Rabbit Breeders.

In 1917, the DLP and in 1924 the Reichsverband Deutscher Kaninchenzüchter (Reich Association of German Rabbit Breeders) recognized the race under the name of Fee de Marburg and published the federal standard.

=== Holland ===
In 1918, a Dutch breeder named Spruya, who was previously known for his pigeon breeds, found young rabbits in a litter of a Havana, whose color was unusual for the breed itself. He informed his friend J. Van Piggelen, and the two friends therefore decided to raise and work with these unusual colored rabbits, and with the help of other breeders from the region of Gouda and Utrecht, they ended up creating the Gouwenaar breed.

=== England ===
It was a few years later, in 1922, that an English curator, G. Lathan, crossed Beveren Blue rabbits with Havanas and ended up with darker offspring. By continuously working with these black rabbits, she later discovered the "blue bunny with a pink reflection" after generations of offspring, which she found very pleasing. The creation of this spectacular result, led to Lathan selectively breeding rabbit offspring into creating the Lilac Rabbit.

=== France ===
The introduction of the Fee de Marbourg in France had made a confusing start among rabbit breeders and enthusiasts. The breed was accepted in the collection of standards, but under a bilingual format for its name. It was officially called 'Petit Gris' in French (Little Grey) and 'Rabbit Fairy' in the German text, with both containing a description of the inconsistent color that is used to describe the rabbit's fur.

== See also ==
- List of rabbit breeds
- Havana rabbit
- Lilac rabbit
- Beveren rabbit
