= Colegio La Fe =

Location
- Urb. La Granja, Av. Salvador Feo La Cruz; Naguanagua; Naguanagua, Carabobo 2005; Venezuela

Information
- School type: Private
- Religious affiliation: Catholic
- Opened: 11 October 1992
- Founder: Enrique Correa Trujillo, Iraima Sánchez de Toledo
- Status: Active
- Director: Ángel Méndez
- Gender: Both
- Schedule: Monday - Friday: 7am - 4:30pm
- Website: uecolegiolafe.com

Colegio La Fe (Private School in Valencia, Naguanagua, Venezuela) is a Private Institution in Naguanagua, Venezuela. With over 30 years of experience forming leaders, Colegio La Fe combines discipline, technology, and faith.

== Foundation ==
Founded on October 11, 1992, by Professor Enrique Correa Trujillo and Iraima Sanchez de Toledo.
