= Centro de Salud Familiar La Fe =

Health center in El Paso, Texas, US

Centro de Salud Familiar La Fe (also known as La Fe Clinic and formerly known as the Father Rahm Clinic) is a health center located in South El Paso in the El Segundo Barrio neighborhood. The nonprofit organization today also provides educational opportunities and other services as well as a clinic.

== History ==
Nina Cordero, who had lived in El Segundo Barrio her entire life, helped establish what would later become the La Fe Clinic. The Ochoa Parents Association was also instrumental in the creation of the clinic which was started in a tenement in El Segundo Barrio in 1967. The tenement was known locally as Los Seis Infiernos. The original doctors and nurses working at the clinic in the tenement were volunteers. Later the clinic was renamed Father Rahm Clinic in honor of the priest, Harold Rahm, who was active in the community.

Cordero was the chair of the board of the Father Rahm Clinic in 1971 when it was moved to a location loaned to them by the Lydia Patterson Institute. Materials were donated in order to help build the new clinic. The clinic also received several grants in order to train and hire individuals from the community who were interested in health-care jobs. The groundbreaking ceremony for the clinic which would include three examination rooms, x-ray facilities and a multipurpose room, took place on June 5, 1971. In 1972, the United Methodist Church donated $18,000 to create a pharmacy co-op. The clinic was renamed Centro de Salud Familiar La Fe in 1973. Part of the reason for the name change was "To avoid conflicts with Catholic philosophy, such as in the area of family planning." In February 1975, Raymond A. Gardea was the head of the clinic, though he had resigned by May 1975.

There were rumors in 1975 that the clinic may not still be around by 1976. In 1976, Newark Maternity Hospital removed physicians that were staffing the La Fe Clinic, leading to La Fe filing an injunction against the hospital, which was later denied. Without Newark providing doctors, La Fe would have to find another providing facility. In 1977, members of the board of La Fe asked for doctors from the Texas Tech University School of Medicine to help staff the clinic. This partly led to a series of demonstrations in front of the clinic starting in April 1977. The demonstrators called themselves "Amigos de La Fe", and demanded that two nurses, Marta Apodaca and Roberto Watson, and a doctor, Albert Chavira, who were let go be rehired. They also asked that Don Garcia of the clinic board be reinstated. Other demands included asking for the resignation of several clinic directors. Two leaders in the protest were Daniel Solis and Cecilia Vega. The Amigos occupied the clinic more than once. The group attempted to reopen and run the clinic themselves. Eventually, some members of the board resigned, but not all demands were met and protesters continued to demonstrate into August 1977, though they were ordered not to block workers from entering the clinic building.

La Fe Clinic had a budget shortfall of $500,000 in 1987. The executive director, Pete Duarte, came up with a publicity stunt to raise money which involved him vowing to "sacrifice" himself to the Aztec goddess, Xochitiisquatl, if the money could not be found for the clinic. The fund raiser fell short of the goal, raising $7,000 in forty days. Duarte performed the fund-raising gimmick again in 1988.

In 1990, the clinic saw around 9,600 patients. In 1992, Salvador Balcorta was hired as an executive director of La Fe Clinic. The clinic had sixty people on staff and a $3 million budget at this time. When Balcorta started working as the head of La Fe, he began to think about expanding the clinic into other programs. Around 2002, La Fe began to get involved in community housing. By 2012, La Fe clinic had 450 people working there and a budget of $25 million. The center also operates a technology community center and provides educational opportunities.
