= El Segundo Barrio =

Neighborhood of El Paso, Texas, United States

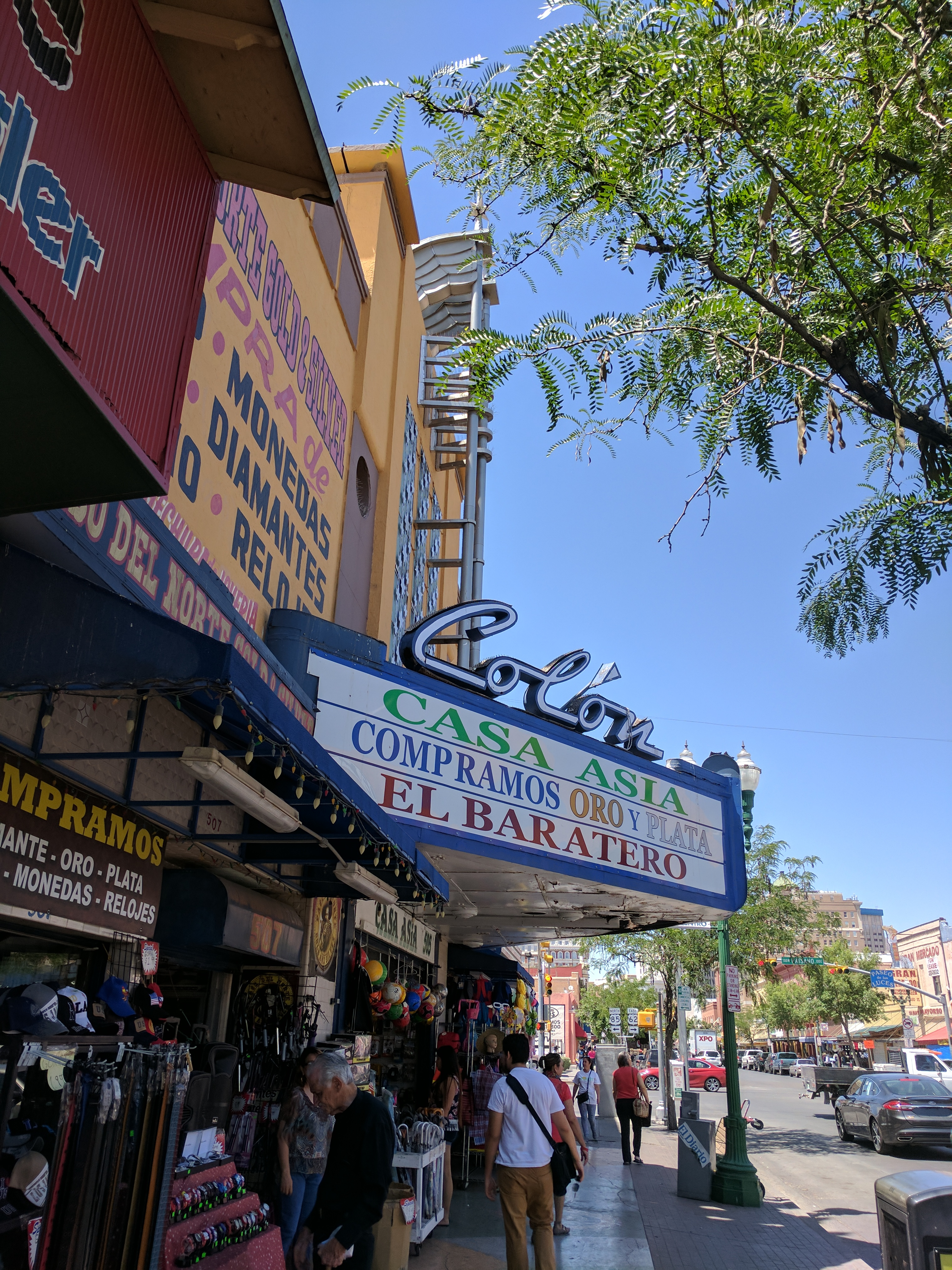

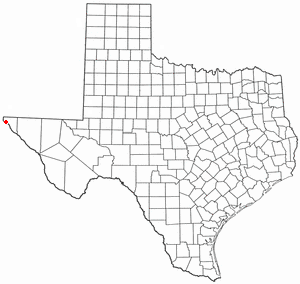
- Location in the state of Texas
- Coordinates: 31.754°N 106.478°W
- Country: United States
- State: Texas
- County: El Paso County
- City: El Paso
- Elevation: 3,600 ft (1,100 m)
- Time zone: UTC-6 (MDT)
  - Summer (DST): UTC-6 (CDT)

El Segundo Barrio (Spanish for "the Second Neighborhood", and also known as South El Paso) is a historic Hispanic neighborhood in El Paso, Texas. It is one of the oldest neighborhoods in El Paso. It was one of the main ports of entry into the United States from Mexico for many years, and became known as the "other Ellis Island" as a result.

Segundo Barrio is well known for its murals and cultural character. In 2016, the area was placed on the Most Endangered Places in Texas list compiled by Preservation Texas. El Segundo Barrio shares much of its history with another southern neighborhood, Chihuahuita.

== History ==
El Segundo Barrio has been the "starting point for thousands of families" coming from Mexico since the 1880s. It is the second historic neighborhood of El Paso, the first being Barrio Chihuahuita. The railroad arrived in El Paso in 1881, and afterwards, the population of El Paso grew quickly.

The first resident of Segundo Barrio was a campesino, or farm worker, named Santiago Alvarado, who received a Mexican land grant to farm the area in 1834.

During the Mexican Revolution, many people fled the country, immigrating into El Segundo Barrio. Wealthier migrants continued north, while the poor remained in the barrio. Revolutionaries, spies and journalists lived in Segundo Barrio during the revolution. Francisco Madero lived in different houses in the neighborhood while he was working on a plan to defeat Porfirio Díaz. Pancho Villa also visited El Segundo Barrio, eating ice cream at the local Elite Confectionary.

In the 1930s, the barrio was overcrowded, with residents living in presidios or tenements. Progress on upgrading housing had still not been improved by the 1950s. In the 1950s, it was recorded that there were still "more than 12,000 substandard dwelling units in the area, an average of seven families per toilet, with an average of ten persons per family."

In the 1960s, the city finally made improvements to Segundo Barrio, paving and lighting streets. The Rio Grande, which did not flow in a regular channel was eventually routed through a cement channel in the 1960s. Land containing tenements on the El Paso side was given up to create the channel.

July 1967 saw a tragic fire that destroyed a tenement building which had no fire escapes. Three children died in the fire. People were mobilized by the tragedy of the fire and began to protest, first starting at the El Sagrado Corazon Catholic Church and then moving on to City Hall. The protests had the effect of scaring local officials and spurred a conference held at the University of Texas at El Paso (UTEP), to "study the social, economic, and political conditions of south El Paso." A local activist, José Aguilar, created a program called the Mexican-American Committee on Honor, Opportunity, and Service (MACHOS), which required that members live in Segundo Barrio and which advocated on behalf of residents for improved living conditions.

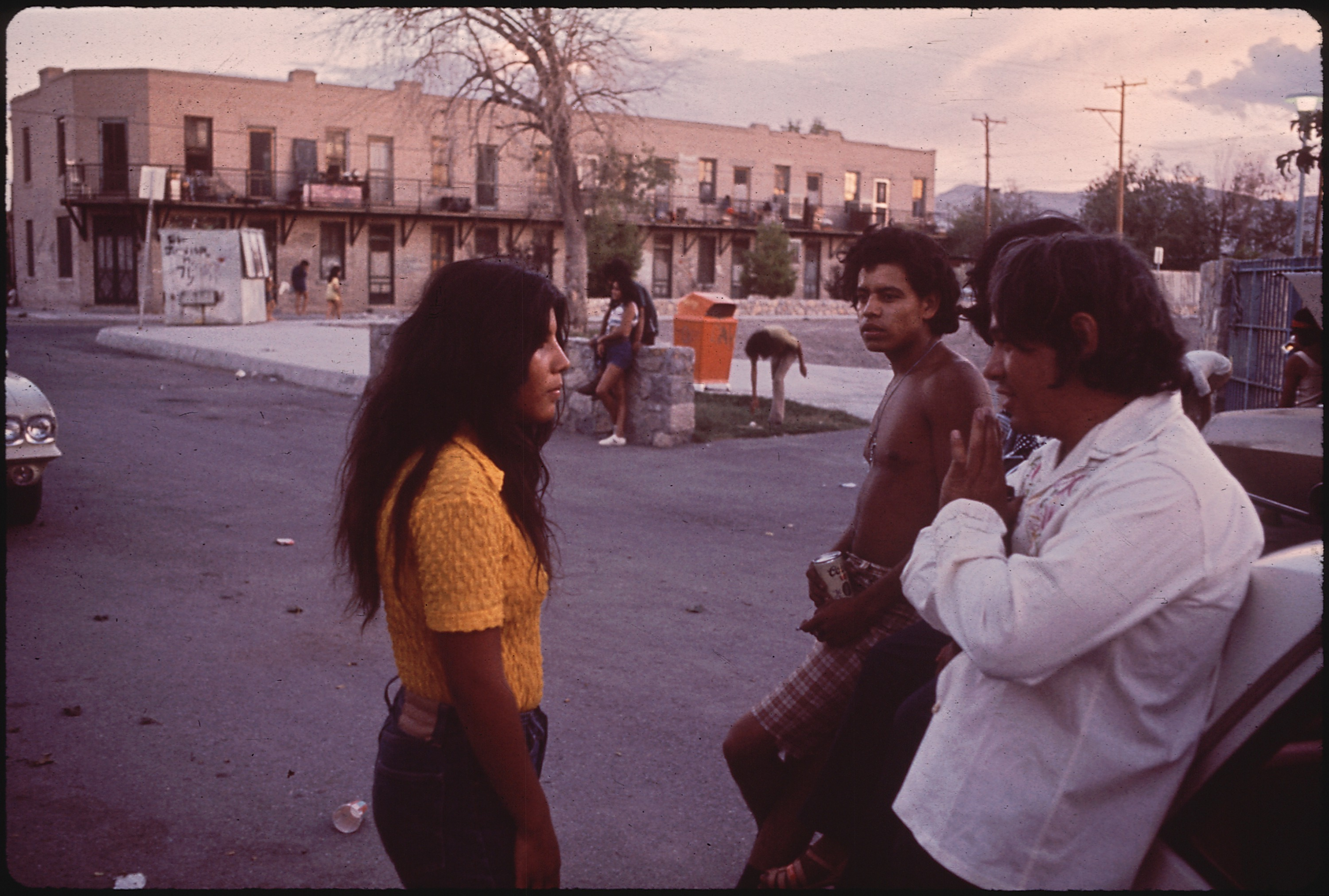
Photo by Danny Lyon for the National Archives, 1972.

In the 1980s, Segundo Barrio was considered a "rough neighborhood."

Flooding in 2006 affected Segundo Barrio. The area was evacuated temporarily in August 2006. A historic building which dated from 1910, the Casitas del Norte Apartments were damaged by the flooding and subsequently renovated by the Community Development Block Grant (CDBG).

In 2010, the City of El Paso devised a Neighborhood Revitalization Strategy. The strategy was known locally as "El Plan," and was written up initially by the Paso del Norte Group. The plan was intended to help "address El Segundo's substandard housing as well as its high levels of unemployment," however, the plan also advised demolishing many historic and important cultural buildings. The City would use eminent domain to take property in Segundo Barrio. Approximately 168 acres were slated to be destroyed and about 157 acres would be designated as historic areas. The public was furious, creating a group called Land Grab Opponents of El Paso. The outcry against destroying buildings in Segundo Barrio caused the city to change its plans.

== Cityscape ==
Segundo Barrio is bounded by Paisano Drive, Cesar Chavez Border Highway, Cotton Street and South Mesa Street.

Due to historic flooding from the Rio Grande, the curbs of the oldest streets in El Segundo Barrio are still "raised a foot or more."

Businesses in Segundo Barrio make "roughly half a billion dollars in business a year."

== Demographics ==
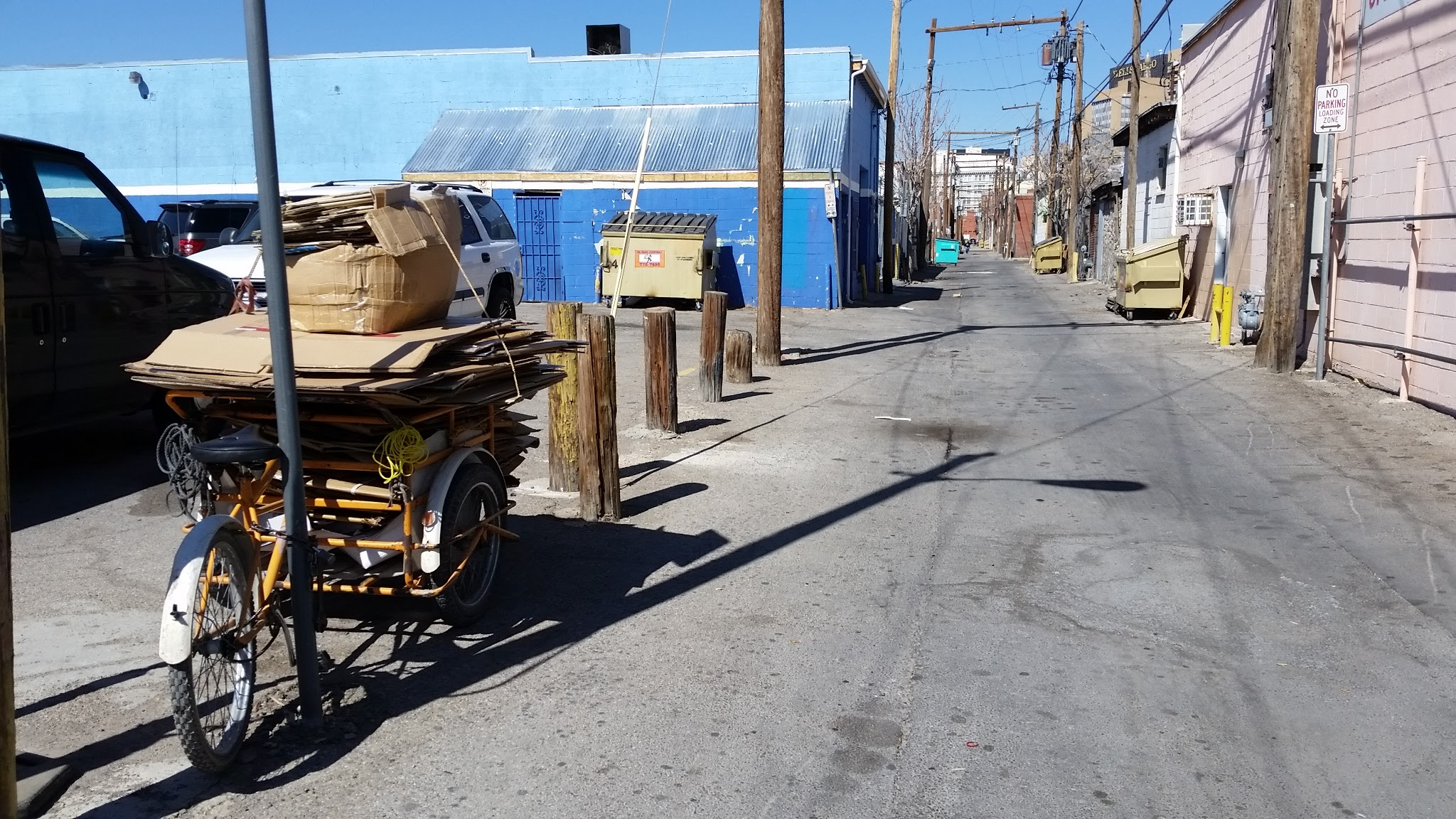
Cardboard for recycling is piled on a cargo tricycle in front of an alley in Segundo Barrio, 2016.

Historically and currently, most residents of Segundo Barrio are farm workers. Segundo Barrio was one of the poorest zip codes in the country for "many years." Today, there is still a low median income in Segundo Barrio.

== Government and infrastructure ==
Segundo Barrio is part of District 8 in the City of El Paso. Currently, the district is represented by Cissy Lizarraga.

== Education ==
The first school in the area was the Sacred Heart School, which opened in 1892. The school was founded by Father Carlos M. Pinto, who was also known as "The Apostle of El Paso."

In general, the El Paso School Board did not allow children who did not speak English to enroll in public schools and so "Mexican preparatory schools" were created instead. The first schools in the neighborhood were created by Olives Villanueva Aoy, a member of =The Church of Jesus Christ of Latter-day Saints, who opened an escuelita (little school) 1887 with his own money and started teaching in both English and Spanish. Aoy also helped provide food, clothing and medical assistance. He also provided his own seats, books and blackboards. The El Paso school board took it over in 1888 and renamed it the Mexican Preparatory School. The board appointed Aoy as the principal of the preparatory school and given two assistants. Later, Aoy was given another building to use for teaching in 1891. Later, in 1899 the School Board built a six-room school, named Aoy School, in the center of the neighborhood. The new school had the largest enrollment of students in any El Paso school in 1900, with 500 students enrolled.

The superintendent of schools in 1913 was supportive of the generally unpopular idea of improving and creating schools in Chihuahuita. Also in 1913, the suggestion of compulsory school attendance was brought up. In 1915, the El Paso Herald was advocating for the creation of schools in the area. Around 3,000 mostly Spanish-speaking children were not being educated at the time because there were not enough schools in the area. The schools that existed had as many as 120 students to a room. Plans to save money for schools in 1919 included cutting the amount of class time for students by teaching first graders in Chihuahuita and other "Mexican" parts of town half days instead of full days. The public schools, Alamo School and Bowie High School opened in 1923.

The public is served by the Armijo Library, part of the El Paso Public Library system.

== Health care ==
In 1921, the Methodist Church in El Paso built the Freeman Clinic. The clinic had ties to the Rose Gregory Houchen Settlement House. Freemen Clinic was geared towards well-baby exams, and prenatal care. The emphasis on infant health was due to the "alarmingly high" rate of infant mortality during the time. Later, the Freeman Clinic was demolished in 1937 in order to open a twenty-two bed hospital, the Newark Methodist Maternity Hospital.

Centro De Salud Familiar La Fe provides healthcare through clinics in the area.

== Parks and recreation ==
For many years, the only playground in Segundo Barrio was part of the Rose Gregory Houchen Settlement House program.

== Culture ==
=== Art ===
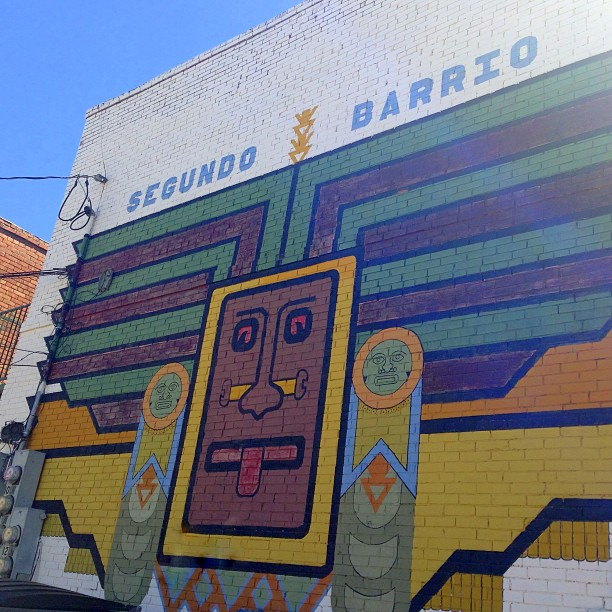
Segundo Barrio, (1975) by Los Muralistas Del Barrio, Arturo Avalos, Gabriel Ortega, Pablo Schaffino and Pascual Ramirez

El Segundo Barrio has many Chicana/o murals within the neighborhood by prominent local artists like Jesus "Cimi" Alvarado, Lxs Dos, and Martin "Blaster" Zubia. Most of the murals were created through "informal arrangements" and the murals were called an "outdoor museum of the border proletariat" by The New York Times.

=== Museums ===
In 2006, a "museum without walls," called Museo Urbano, brought events and workshops to El Segundo Barrio. Museo Urbano evolved into a public history project in conjunction with the Department of History at UTEP. Museo Urbano won the 2013 Outstanding Public History Project Award from the National Council on Public History.

=== Games and sports ===
The Segundo Barrio Futbol Club has almost 150 kids involved in playing soccer. A basketball camp, Barrio Basketball, has been taking place in Segundo Barrio for several years. The Henderson Middle School chess team took first place in the novice division for the National Junior High Championship in 2015.

=== Religion ===
El Sagrado Corazon Catholic Church (Sacred Heart Church) was dedicated in 1893, and it continues to be an important church in the area. It is considered the "mother church" of the El Paso Diocese. The church operates adult education programs, a job seeking office, a food pantry and a restaurant and tortilla factory known as Sagrado Corazón Tortilleria & Grill. The church also provides financial support to families who are having trouble paying rent or utilities. Saint Ignacius is another Catholic church in the area.

=== Community centers ===
The Rose Gregory Houchen Settlement was founded in 1912 in the center of Segundo Barrio. For many years, it was the "only consistent source of social services in Segundo Barrio." The Settlement was staffed mainly by members of the Methodist Church and provided rooms for Mexican women and a kindergarten. By 1918 Houchen was also providing citizenship classes and other classes such as cooking, carpentry, Bible study and English classes. During the 1950s, the Houchen staff composed of Mexican women developed a community centered approach to meet the needs of the El Segundo Barrio residents. These women were: Mary Lou Lopez, Maria Rico, Elisabeth Soto, Febe Bonilla, Clara Saramiento, Maria Pyan, Beatrice Fernandez and Ofilia Chavez. The Settlement eventually evolved into more of a community center, with ties to the League of United Latin American Citizens (LULAC). In the 1950s, there were two LULAC chapters located at Houchen, one for teens and another for adults. The Houchen settlement remained until 1962. The center continues to evolve, with plans to open an organic market.

Centro De Salud Familiar La Fe also provides a community center with art, adult education classes and a technology center.

=== Notable residents ===
- Franco Ambriz, playwright
- Olivas Villanueva Aoy, educator
- Mariano Azuela, doctor and novelist.
- Mel Casas (1929-2014), artist.
- Blanca Enriquez, Head Start director.
- Gaspar Enriquez, artist, named Segundo Barrio Person of the Year, 2016.
- Henry O. Flipper, Buffalo soldier.
- Catalina Garcia, anesthesiologist and community leader in Dallas.
- Victor Leaton Ochoa, inventor, politician and writer.
- Francisco Madero, Mexican revolutionary leader and president.
- Paul Moreno, Texas state representative.
- Carlos Munoz Jr., civil rights activist.
- Guadalupe Ramirez, activist and community leader in Los Angeles.
- Nolan Richardson (born 1941), basketball coach.
- Teresa Urrea (1873-1906), journalist and Mexican revolutionary.
- Leona Ford Washington (1928-2007), community activist and founder of the McCall Neighborhood center.

== In popular culture ==
Several books have been written about living in El Segundo Barrio. Champion of the Barrio: The Legacy of Coach Buryl Baty (2015). It is a biography of Baty who coached football at Bowie high school. In 1996, Gloria López-Stafford wrote a memoir of her life in Segundo Barrio. It was called A Place in El Paso: A Mexican-American Childhood. Marquez, Benjamin. Power And Politics in a Chicano Barrio: A Study of Mobilization Efforts and Community Power in El Paso. Lanham: University Press of America, 1985.

A documentary film created for PBS, "One Square Mile: El Paso - Segundo Barrio" was created in 2014.

== See also ==
- Centro de Salud Familiar La Fe
- Chihuahuita
- El Paso, Texas
- Central El Paso
