= Border Network for Human Rights =

US immigration and human rights nonprofit

- Abbreviation: BNHR
- Formation: Tax-exempt since August 1988; 38 years ago
- Type: 501(c)(3)
- Tax ID no.: EIN 742493012
- Headquarters: El Paso
- Executive Director: Fernando Garcia
- Revenue: 1,305,476 USD (2024)
- Expenses: 1,753,759 USD (2024)
- Website: bnhr.org

The Border Network for Human Rights, or BNHR, is a nonprofit organization based in El Paso, Texas, that advocates for immigration reform and human rights to create the political, economic, and social conditions in which every human being is equal in dignity and rights. The organization also documents cases of the abuse of immigrants by United States Government authorities. Efforts by BNHR to systematically document and report abuse of immigrants has led to fewer incidents in the El Paso area, according to the group. BNHR is working to make its approach a national model for reform. The Network had organized many events for the safeguarding of human rights that include Hugs Not Walls, Annual Abuse Documentation Campaigns, and Human Rights Promoters Campaigns.

== About ==
The Network's strengths lie in organizing and working within the system to combat human rights and civil rights abuses, and to bring about change within the broken United States immigration system. Cases of abuse and misconduct along the United States-Mexico border between US authorities and persons subject to their authority are pervasive, according to the Immigration Policy Center. Reports include cases where customs officers at the border have committed acts of verbal and physical abuse. Cases at the border allegedly committed by Border Patrol agents against illegal immigrants have been described as hate crimes by the Los Angeles Times. In addition, many agents who have committed acts of abuse against people crossing at the border are often not disciplined. The Network is participating in a nationwide effort to push forward immigration reforms like the Texas-Wide Reform Immigration for Texas Alliance, by educating government officials on the needs of border communities. With over 1,000 families and 7,000 individuals participating each day in West Texas and Southern New Mexico, the Network's members speak firsthand of their mistreatment and suffering under the laws of the United States government, advocate for reform, and reach out to be heard amidst the debilitating effects placed on them each day by US immigration policies.

== Background ==
Fernando Garcia, founder and executive director of the Border Network for Human Rights, was one of the first coordinators of the group originally known as the Border Rights Coalition, or BRC, which was created in the early 1990s by lawyers, civil rights activists, and church groups in El Paso. The BRC began documenting cases of alleged abuse carried out by Border Patrol, US Customs, and other immigration law enforcement agencies in the area, and was also active in protesting the treatment of immigrants. It transformed into the Border Network for Human Rights in 2001. That same year BNHR instituted its first campaign of documenting abuses, led by members of the community with the support of attorneys in the area. Within three years, the network held its first public event on February 22, 2003 memorializing the death of Juan Patricio Pereza Quijada.
