= Fe =

Fe or FE may refer to:

== Arts and entertainment ==
- Carolyn Fe, Filipina singer and actress
- Fe (Reyli album)
- Fe (singer), a British singer-songwriter
- "Fe" (song), a song by Jorge González
- Fe (Souled American album)
- Fe (video game), a video game developed by Zoink Games and published by Electronic Arts
- Fallen Earth, a computer game
- Fire Emblem, a series of video games developed by Intelligent Systems and published by Nintendo

== Education ==
- FE exam or Fundamentals of Engineering exam
- Further education, post-16, non-university education in the UK

== Organizations ==
- Falange Española (Spanish Phalanx), a former Spanish political organization
- Fe (baseball), a Cuban League baseball team
- Forsvarets Efterretningstjeneste, the Danish Defence Intelligence Service
- Fuji Electric, a Japanese company
- Primaris Airlines (IATA code FE)

== Science and technology ==
=== Mathematics ===
- Fixed effects model, a statistical model parameter which is fixed or non-random

=== Physics and chemistry ===
- Iron, symbol Fe, a chemical element
- Fluoroescaline, a psychedelic drug
- Field emission, an emission of electrons induced by external electromagnetic fields
- Faraday efficiency, the efficiency of a catalyst in electrochemistry

=== Technology ===
- Ford FE engine, a Ford V8 motor hydrocarbon engine
- Eleventh generation Honda Civic
- FE, part of Mazda's F engine family
- Nikon FE, a 35 mm SLR camera
- Flight engineer, aircraft crew member that monitor and operate the aircraft systems
- Front end, the user interaction interface, usually in web-based applications
- Fast Ethernet

== Other uses ==
- the Hebrew letter fe
- Fe (rune), the f-rune ᚠ of the Younger Futhark
- Fe (Armenian letter)
- FE-Schrift, a typeface used on vehicle registration plates in Germany
- Province of Ferrara (ISO 3166-2:IT code)
- Flat Earth, a pseudoscientific theory
- Formula E, a class of auto racing using electrically powered cars
- Dominical letter FE, for a leap year starting on Tuesday
- Extraverted feeling, in the Myers–Briggs Type Indicator
- José María Pérez, Cuba, formerly known as El Fe
- Federal Electric company, now known as Federal Signal
