= Harris County constables =

Law enforcement agencies in the Houston area

Harris County Constables are elected law enforcement officers for Harris County, Texas. The county is divided into eight constable precincts, employing nearly 1,800 deputy constables. These agencies focus largely on building relationships with their communities, but rarely address serious crime.

Constables are often deployed in Harris County when Houston Police Department and the Harris County Sheriff's Office are unavailable to respond to calls. In certain instances, a "contract deputy" might be dispatched if a particular neighborhood or subdivision has opted into the paid program.

Harris County Constables are unusual among Texas constables, with a number of special operations that address a variety of issues, including but not limited to, "animal cruelty, school security or vice enforcement."

== Authority ==
The Texas Constitution provides for the creation of constable precincts. Constables and their deputies may exercise their duties, which include serving eviction notices, subpoenas, and arrest warrants, in any part of the county. Harris County Constables are not able to respond to 911 calls directly, and can refuse calls for service.

A Houston Chronicle analysis found that Harris County Constables respond to less serious crimes than their peer agencies in the area, although they are able to respond faster on average than HPD or the sheriff's office. They do not respond directly to 911 calls, and are seen by some critics as redundant law enforcement agencies that should be consolidated into the Harris County Sheriff's Office to reduce government inefficiency and improve service.

== Contract deputy program ==
The contract deputy program, created in the 1980s, is a taxpayer-subsidized program which allows municipal utility districts, homeowner's associations, and other interested parties to enter into a contract for patrol services within their neighborhood. These entities cover around 70% of the costs of salaries, benefits, and cars while the county pays the remaining 30% for constables and sheriff's deputies to patrol that neighborhood. Harris County taxpayers pay approximately $38 million to subsidize these agreements. As of 2024, roughly 1,200 "contract deputies" are active throughout the county.

== Legal immunity ==
A 1980 case and lawsuit involving a San Jacinto County Constable resulted in a legal loophole where constables' offices can't be sued individually because they are a part of the county, but the county can't be held liable for the constables' actions because the constables are not official county policymakers. This has resulted in one of Harris County's fastest-growing law enforcement agencies being effectively immune from lawsuits, even in situations involving significant violence and sexual exploitation.

== Redistricting ==
Harris County Constables have a great deal of political clout because neighborhoods are able to pay for contract deputies, which has been described as a “boutique policing” model. They are often more responsive to the neighborhoods that they serve, which means that changing the precinct boundaries to address population changes could negatively affect their popularity. Despite significant challenges posed by the current boundaries, Harris County Commissioners have chosen not to redraw constable precinct boundaries since 1973. As a result, population sizes vary from about 131,000 residents in Precinct 6 to 1.3 million residents in Precinct 5.

The 16 Harris County Justice of the peace courts have enormous disparities in both populations served and the volume of civil cases that they oversee, which many experts believe is because the Justice of the Peace precincts share boundaries with the Harris County Constable precincts. The most active courts hear as many as 15 times the number of civil cases as the least active courts. The larger caseloads, nearing 45,000 annually or 300 daily in Precinct 5 courts, mean that judges in those courts struggle to allocate sufficient time to cases.

== Controversies ==
- Corruption
- Sexual harassment
- Improper campaigning
- Destroying evidence

== See also ==
- Constable (Texas)
- Constables in the United States
