= Constabulary =

Form of police force used in various jurisdictions

Constabulary may have several definitions:

- A civil, non-paramilitary (police) force consisting of police officers called constables. This is the usual definition in the United Kingdom, in which all county police forces once bore the title (and some territorial police forces, as well as the Civil Nuclear Constabulary, still do). Constables also exist in some U.S. states including Texas and Pennsylvania.
- In English-speaking Canada, the starting rank of all police officers is Constable. The provincial police service of Newfoundland and Labrador is the Royal Newfoundland Constabulary. This term reflects the force's history of having been modelled after the Royal Irish Constabulary. In this case, Constabulary is used in the same sense in which it is used in the UK.
- A large civil police force organised and trained along military lines, which may contain paramilitary elements. This is the usual definition in places outside Great Britain such as the former Royal Irish Constabulary, the former Royal Ulster Constabulary, Royal Newfoundland Constabulary, Jamaica Constabulary Force.
- A military or paramilitary type force consisting of soldiers trained for police duties. Mostly established by the United States in the several countries over which it had protective status e.g. Philippine Constabulary; United States Constabulary in West Germany after World War II. These forces also performed military functions by maintaining "mobile forces" of organised units.

== Current police services titled Constabulary ==
=== Constabularies in Great Britain ===
- Avon and Somerset Constabulary
- Belfast International Airport Constabulary
- Cambridgeshire Constabulary
- Cheshire Constabulary
- Civil Nuclear Constabulary
- Derbyshire Constabulary
- Durham Constabulary
- Gloucestershire Constabulary
- Hampshire and Isle of Wight Constabulary
- Hampstead Heath Constabulary
- Havering Parks Constabulary
- Hertfordshire Constabulary
- Kew Constabulary
- Lancashire Constabulary
- Norfolk Constabulary
- Suffolk Constabulary

=== Constabularies in Commonwealth nations ===
- Royal Newfoundland Constabulary
- Jamaica Constabulary Force
- Royal Papua New Guinea Constabulary
- Pakistan Federal Constabulary

=== Constabularies in the Netherlands ===
- Royal Marechaussee AKA Royal Military Constabulary
- Dienst Speciale Interventies
- Brigade Speciale Beveiligingsopdrachten

== Historical constabularies ==
Pakistan

- Frontier Constabulary

Philippines

- Philippine Constabulary – created in 1901 by the American colonial administration. It was demilitarised and merged with the Integrated National Police in 1991 to form the Philippine National Police.

Great Britain

- Kent County Constabulary – Changed its name to Kent Police in 2002 due to "Constabulary" being considered confusing.

Ireland

- Royal Irish Constabulary – The United Kingdom's paramilitary police force in Ireland from 1822 to 1922.

Northern Ireland

- Royal Ulster Constabulary – The United Kingdom's police force in Northern Ireland from 1922 – 2001 when it was reformed as the Police Service of Northern Ireland.
- Ulster Special Constabulary – a reserve police force from 1920 until it was disbanded in 1970.

Free City of Danzig

- Free City of Danzig Police – The law enforcement agency of the semi-autonomous Free City of Danzig from 1919 - 1945.

United States

- United States Constabulary – United States Army military gendarmerie force. From 1946 to 1952, in the aftermath of World War II, it acted as an occupation and security force in the U.S. Occupation Zone of West Germany and Austria.
- Pennsylvania State Constables – an elected office held in all Pennsylvania townships, boroughs, and cities except Philadelphia; unrelated to the Pennsylvania State Police

Malaysia

- North Borneo Constabulary – The paramilitary police force of North Borneo from 1800s to 1963 where it was officially incorporated into Royal Malaysia Police shortly after the formation of Malaysia.
- Sarawak Constabulary – The paramilitary police force of Kingdom of Sarawak from 1800s to 1963 where it was officially incorporated into Royal Malaysia Police shortly after the formation of Malaysia.

South Africa

- South African Constabulary – The paramilitary gendarmerie force raised by the British Army to police captured areas of the two former Boer republics of the Transvaal and Orange Free State during the Second Boer War from 1900 to 1908.
