= Montgomery Building (El Paso, Texas) =

Coordinates: 31.7573°N 106.4886°W

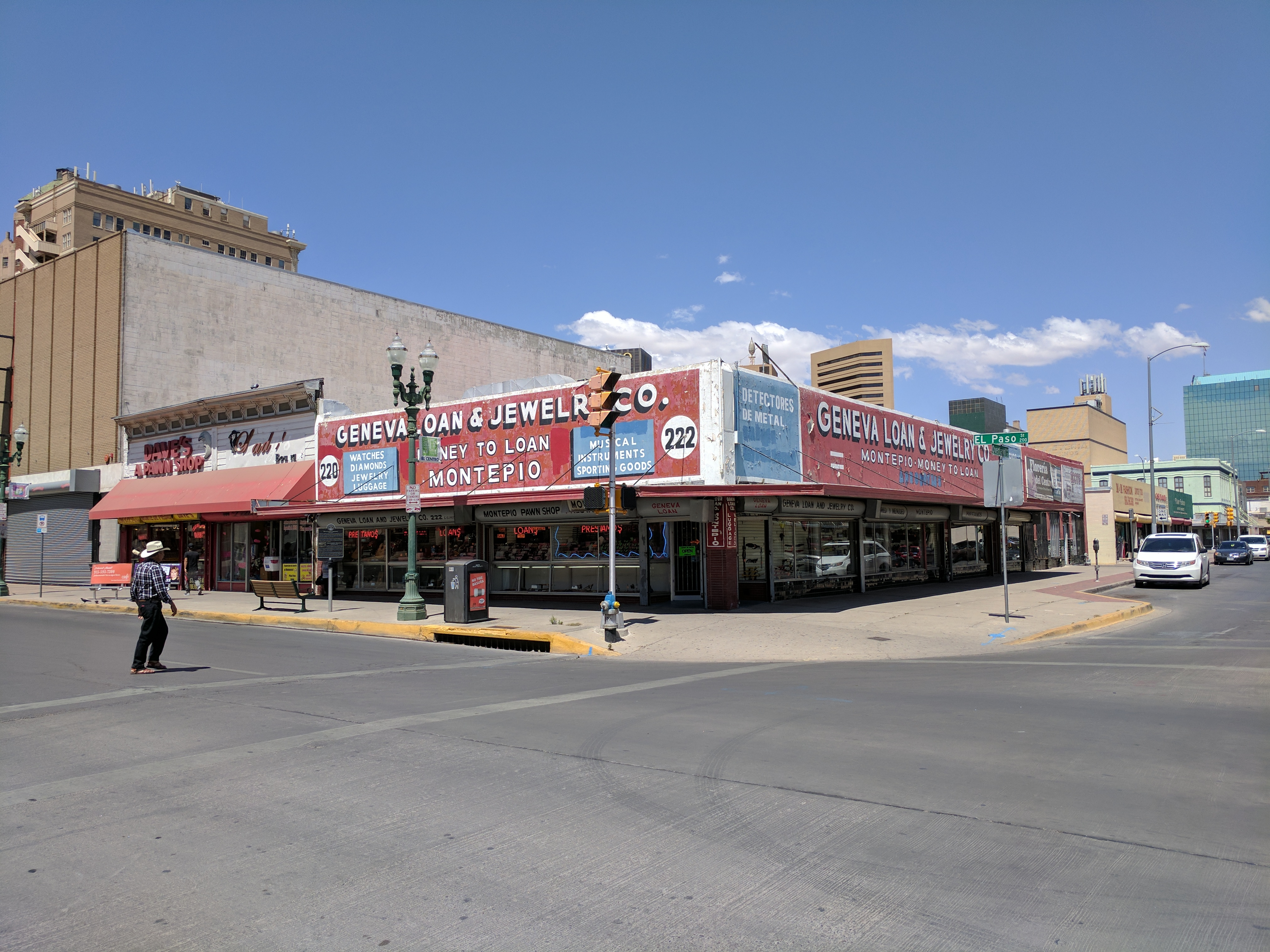
The Montgomery Building

The Montgomery Building is the last surviving false-front structure and the oldest existing business building in the City of El Paso, Texas.

== History ==
The Montgomery Building was built as the American El Paso, as opposed to a Mexican El Paso, underwent a great transformation from a dusty adobe village to a thriving city following the arrival of the railroad on May 13, 1881. The Southern Pacific Railroad had just arrived in El Paso and two other railroads were approaching the outskirts of the county. A great commercial building boom followed as lumber and brick structures, some two stories high, began replacing adobe ones. El Paso Street became a bustling center of commerce running from San Jacinto Plaza on San Francisco Street to the ferry landing at the Rio Grande.

In 1882, just months after the Four Dead in Five Seconds Gunfight, William J. Montgomery (1833–1899) built this structure on a vacant lot between two buildings that were situated North and South of the property. Montgomery made use of the two buildings' existing walls, constructing only a roof, floor, front wall and back wall. He ran a new wall down the middle, creating two new addresses, 216 and 218 El Paso Street.

The building was typical of western frontier architecture of the late 19th century. It featured a false front to make it appear taller and more like commercial buildings found in the East. Originally, the building housed a drug store and a book store.

== Architectural significance ==
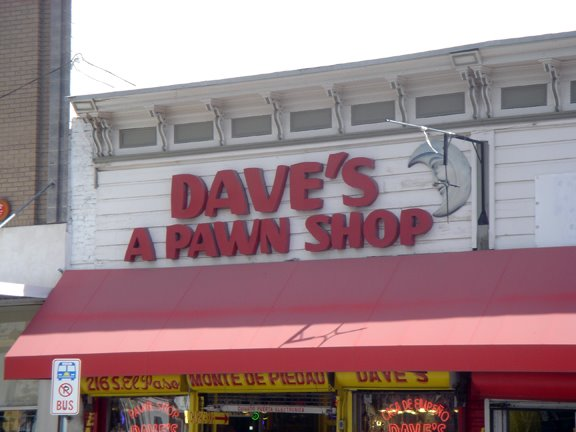
The wooden facade of the building lies beneath a modern sign but the cornice is clearly visible.

The outward appearance of the Montgomery building was typical of those built in Western towns during the railroad boom of the late 19th century. Developers wanted railroad towns to look as much like eastern towns as possible so stone and lumber quickly replaced adobe and log as the primary building materials. Timber was scarce in El Paso but the railroad brought milled lumber, much of it from the Cloudcroft area. Railroads also brought pressed tin, cast iron, glass and hardware that were used to simulate styles popular in the eastern United States.

The one-part commercial building is a simple box with a decorated wood façade and cornice. The architectural style of small, pitched-roof buildings with false fronts created the commercial core of the new western towns during the mid-19th century.

The Montgomery building had one ground-level floor with a false front added to make the building appear taller. The false front was topped by a bracketed cornice typical of the Italianate style popular at the time. This created the impression that the building was larger and housed more businesses and people, similar to the main commercial streets found in eastern American towns. In front of the original structure there was a wooden sidewalk covered by a wooden roof and hitching posts for horses. It is known exactly what the exterior of the Montgomery building looked like in 1882 from a photograph taken by F. Parker who documented many of the changes taking place in the city during that period.

== Modern times ==
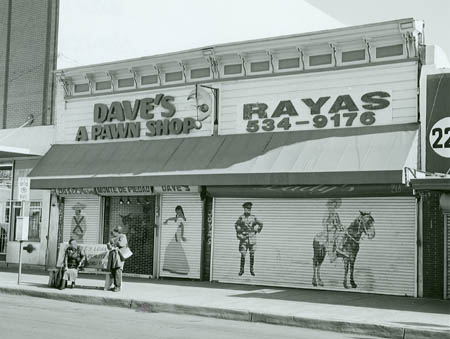
Modern-day view of the Montgomery Building after store hours.

The two addresses have undergone many interior and exterior renovations over the years. They have housed drugstores, restaurants, shoemakers, and clothing stores. The building is now occupied by Dave’s A Pawn Shop and a clothing store. With the arrival of the automobile and the paving of streets, the wooden sidewalks, post, and roofs were removed and conventional sidewalks were constructed. Today, the wooden facade of the building lies beneath a modern sign but the cornice is clearly visible. 216-218 S. El Paso Street is a classic example of western architecture from the boom era of the 1880s.

Situated on one of the past main commercial thoroughfares of the city, it continues to represent part of the rich frontier heritage of El Paso and is one of the few remaining structures from the original commercial district of the Old Western town of El Paso.

The addresses 216 and 218 S. El Paso St. have remained in continuous use for more than one hundred and twenty years making it the oldest surviving commercial structure in the City of El Paso.

== External links and references ==
- El Paso Historic Registry
- El Paso Community College Local History Project
