= Four Dead in Five Seconds Gunfight =

1881 shootout in the streets of El Paso, Texas

Coordinates: 31.764°N 106.495°W

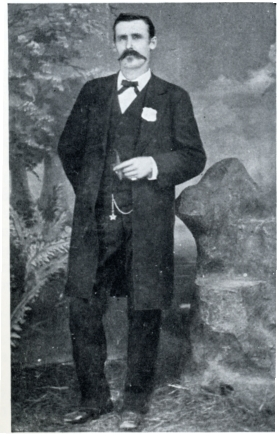
- Dallas Stoudenmire
- Location: El Paso Street, El Paso, Texas, U.S.
- Date: April 14, 1881
- Deaths: 4

The Four Dead in Five Seconds Gunfight was a famous gun fight that occurred on April 14, 1881, on El Paso Street, in El Paso, Texas. Witnesses generally agreed that the incident lasted no more than five seconds after the first gunshot, though a few would insist it was at least ten seconds. Marshal Dallas Stoudenmire accounted for three of the four fatalities with his twin .44 caliber Smith & Wesson revolvers.

== Background ==
On April 14, 1881, a group of about 75 heavily armed Mexicans moved into El Paso, Texas, looking for two missing vaqueros named Sanchez and Juarique, who had been searching for 30 head of cattle stolen from Mexico. Solomon Schutz, mayor of El Paso, made an exception for the Mexicans, allowing them to enter the city limits with their firearms. Gus Krempkau, an El Paso County constable, accompanied the posse to the ranch of Johnny Hale, a local ranch owner and suspected cattle rustler, who lived some 13 miles (21 km) northwest of El Paso in the Upper Valley. The corpses of the two missing men were located near Hale's ranch and were carried back to El Paso.

A court in El Paso held an inquest into the deaths, with Constable Krempkau, who was fluent in Spanish, acting as an interpreter. The verdict was that Sanchez and Juarique had been in the vicinity of Hale's ranch looking for the stolen cattle. The court determined that the American cattle rustlers, among them Hale, had feared the men would discover the cattle and return with a larger, armed Mexican force. Two American cattle rustlers, Pervey and Fredericks, were accused of the murders of Sanchez and Juarique after they were overheard bragging about killing two cowboys when they found them trailing the herd to Hale's ranch during the night of April 13 or in the early morning of the 14th.

Meanwhile, a large crowd had gathered in El Paso, including John Hale and his friend, former town marshal George Campbell. There was tension among some of the Americans, who were concerned that the Mexicans, with a combination of anger, restlessness, and being heavily armed, would become violent while demanding justice for their two murdered comrades. At the inquest, Pervey and Fredericks were formally charged with the murders and immediately arrested. Court was adjourned and the crowd dispersed. The arrestees were scheduled for trial at a later date. With the formerly tense situation defused, the Mexicans returned to Mexico with the two corpses for proper burial.

== Gunfight ==
Marshal Dallas Stoudenmire, a noted gunfighter who had only started as town marshal on April 11, was present in the court room. After the court adjourned, he walked across the street for dinner. Constable Krempkau went to a saloon next door to retrieve his rifle and pistol. There, a confrontation took place with George Campbell over remarks he allegedly made about Krempkau’s translations and his apparent friendship with the Mexicans. John Hale, who was reportedly unarmed, was heavily intoxicated and was also upset with Krempkau’s involvement in the matter. Hale grabbed one of Campbell's two pistols and yelled, "George, I've got you covered!" He then shot Krempkau, who reeled backward. Slumping against a saloon door, Krempkau drew his own pistol.

Marshal Stoudenmire heard the shot, jumped up from his dining chair at the Globe Restaurant, pulled out his pistols, and ran out into the street. While running, Stoudenmire fired wildly, killing Ochoa, an innocent Mexican bystander who was running for cover. As the first shot was heard, John Hale jumped behind a thick adobe pillar. When he peered out from behind the pillar, Stoudenmire fired and struck Hale between the eyes, killing him instantly.

Campbell stepped from cover with his pistol drawn, saw Hale lying dead, and yelled to Stoudenmire that this was not his fight. However, Constable Krempkau, mistakenly believing that Campbell had shot him, then fired his pistol twice at Campbell before losing consciousness from loss of blood. Krempkau's first bullet struck Campbell's gun and broke his right wrist, while the second hit him in the foot. Campbell screamed in pain and scooped up his gun from the ground with his left hand. Stoudenmire whirled away from Hale and instantly fired at Campbell, who dropped his gun again, grabbed his stomach and collapsed onto the ground. Stoudenmire walked slowly toward Campbell and glared at him. In agony, Campbell yelled, "You big son of a bitch! You murdered me!" Stoudenmire said nothing. Both Campbell and Krempkau died within minutes.

After just a few seconds, four men lay dead or dying. Three Texas Rangers were standing nearby, but did not take part, saying later that they felt Stoudenmire had the situation well in hand.

== Aftermath ==
Three days after the gunfight, on April 17, 1881, James Manning, a friend of Hale and Campbell, convinced former deputy Bill Johnson to assassinate Stoudenmire. Stoudenmire had publicly humiliated Johnson days before. Late at night of April 17, an intoxicated Johnson was hiding behind a pillar of bricks, but his wobbly legs gave in and he fell backward, squeezing the double triggers of his double barreled shotgun into the air and narrowly missing Stoudenmire. Stoudenmire immediately fired his pistols and sent a volley of eight bullets at Johnson, shooting off his testicles. Johnson bled to death quickly.

This began a feud between Stoudenmire and Manning and his brothers George and Frank. Eventually, Stoudenmire's brother-in-law Stanley "Doc" Cummings and later Stoudenmire himself died at the hands of the Mannings, who were acquitted in two trials where the juries were packed with their friends.

== See also ==
- List of Old West gunfights
