= Dallas Stoudenmire =

United States Marshal (1845–1882)

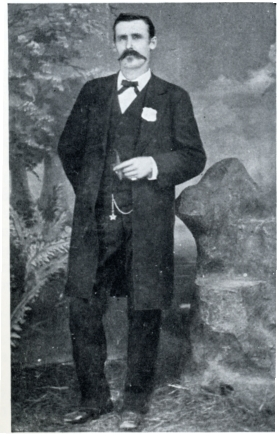
- Born: December 11, 1845; Aberfoil, Bullock County, Alabama, U.S.
- Died: September 18, 1882 (aged 36); El Paso, Texas, U.S.
- Cause of death: Died in shoot-out
- Occupations: Soldier, Texas Ranger, Marshal
- Years active: 1878–1882
- Spouse: Isabella Armstrong (née Sherrington)

Dallas Stoudenmire (December 11, 1845 – September 18, 1882) was an American Old West gunfighter and lawman who gained fame for a brief gunfight that was later dubbed the "Four Dead in Five Seconds Gunfight." Stoudenmire had a deadly reputation in his day and was involved in several gunfights.

== Early life ==
Dallas Stoudenmire was born in Aberfoil, Bullock County, Alabama. He was one of the nine children of Lewis and Elizabeth Stoudenmire. Shortly after the American Civil War began, Stoudenmire enlisted in the Army of the Confederacy, even though he was only 15 years old. Although he was six feet tall, his officers discovered his age and discharged him. He re-enlisted twice more (Note: NOTE: The Civil War Soldiers and Sailors system reports a Pvt D. Stoudenmire Co F of the 17th Alabama Infantry; and a Pvt D. Stowdemire Co C, 6th Alabama Cavalry) and eventually was allowed to serve as a private in Company F, 45th Alabama Infantry Regiment. According to surviving records, he stood 6'4" (1.94 m) tall by the war's end and was wounded numerous times. He carried two bullets in his body for the remainder of his life.

Following the war, Stoudenmire drifted west and served for at least three years with the Texas Rangers. He had a reputation for being handsome, a sharp dresser and a gentleman around ladies. But when intoxicated, he could be extremely dangerous and had a quick temper. He was known for his habit of wearing two guns and being equally accurate with either hand. He disappeared from the records between 1874 and 1878, possibly residing in Mexico for a time. He was able to speak Spanish fairly well, and is known to have worked during the years immediately after the war as a sheep farmer, wheelwright, proprietor, merchandiser, and carpenter.

== Career as a lawman ==
He resurfaced when he served as a town marshal for Socorro, New Mexico. While employed there, his brother-in-law and El Paso, Texas resident, Stanley "Doc" Cummings, convinced him to take up a job as town marshal in El Paso. The city was seeking to hire an outsider with a "rough reputation". At that time, El Paso was a remote, lawless boomtown. Stoudenmire traveled to El Paso by stagecoach and was soon hired. This was the beginning of the end of a wild and violent El Paso and the beginning of his fame.

Marshal Stoudenmire started his tenure in El Paso on Monday, April 11, 1881. He was the sixth town marshal in eight months. The City Council asked him to take the city jail keys from deputy marshal and town drunkard, Bill Johnson. Witnesses alleged that Stoudenmire approached an intoxicated Johnson asking for the jail keys. Johnson mumbled that he would go home and figure out which keys were his and which were the city's. Stoudenmire became impatient and demanded he hand over the keys right away. When Johnson demurred, the marshal is said to have physically turned Johnson upside down, grabbed the keys, and then to have thrown him to the ground. Johnson was publicly humiliated.

== Four Dead in Five Seconds Gunfight ==
On Thursday, April 14, 1881, only three days into his new job, Stoudenmire became involved in one of the most famous gunfights in Old West history, called the "Four Dead in Five Seconds Gunfight." This gunfight was well publicized in newspapers in cities as far away as San Francisco and New York City. The events began a mile (1.6 km) south, at the Rio Grande which divided the U.S. and Mexico. Roughly 75 heavily armed Mexican cowboys galloped into El Paso, looking for two missing young Mexican cowboys, Sánchez and Jauregui, plus thirty cattle stolen from a ranch just across the river. The missing animals belonged to a wealthy Mexican who hired an armed posse to recover them. El Paso County Constable Gus Krempkau was asked by the Mexican leader to lead them to a possible location. Krempkau agreed. The bodies of the two missing Mexicans were discovered near Johnny Hale's ranch about 13 miles (21 km) northwest of El Paso. Hale was a ranch owner and cattle rustler.

The bodies were taken back to town. Records indicated that the young Mexican cowboys were searching for the stolen cattle. Two American cattle rustlers, Peveler and Stevenson, were accused of the murders after they were overheard bragging about killing the two cowboys when they found them trailing the herd to Hale's ranch.

A large crowd gathered in El Paso, including John Hale and his friend, former town marshal George Campbell. There was animosity and worries among the Americans about the dangerous situation of enraged Mexicans demanding justice for the slain men while being heavily armed within the city limits. Constable Krempkau was fluent in Spanish and was required to interpret for the judge at the inquest now held in court. The two Americans were formally charged with the murders and immediately arrested, being scheduled for trial at a later date. The court was adjourned and the crowd dispersed. The armed Mexicans, now calm, took the two corpses back to Mexico for proper burial.

On April 14, 1881 Constable Krempkau went into a saloon to retrieve his rifle and pistol. A confrontation erupted with George Campbell over comments allegedly made by Campbell about Krempkau. A heavily intoxicated John Hale, who was allegedly unarmed and upset by Krempkau's role in the investigation, pulled one of Campbell's two pistols and shot Krempkau. Stoudenmire was eating dinner at a restaurant across the street. Hearing the gunfire, he ran out and started shooting, killing first an innocent Mexican bystander, then Hale. When Campbell saw Hale drop dead, he tried to stop the fight. However, Krempkau, believing that Campbell had shot him, fired at him before losing consciousness. One of Krempkau's bullets struck Campbell's gun, which broke his wrist and dropped the gun while the other bullet struck his foot. Campbell screamed, but managed to scoop up his gun again. Stoudenmire whirled and fired, killing him.

== After the gunfight ==
This gunfight made Stoudenmire a legend, but it eventually had deadly consequences. Although his reputation as a gunman would continue to grow with later gunfights, he had few friends in El Paso, whereas both Campbell and Hale had had many. Eventually, Stoudenmire stood alone in his own defense of his actions. As often was the case, a shooting being justified meant very little in towns of the Old West, and vendettas were common.

Three days after the gunfight, on April 17, 1881, James Manning (he and his brothers were friends to Hale and Campbell) convinced former deputy marshal Bill Johnson to assassinate Stoudenmire. Johnson was known to have a profound hatred and grudge against Stoudenmire for publicly humiliating him. That same night, Johnson, heavily intoxicated, squatted behind a large pillar of bricks with a loaded double-barreled shotgun and waited. When he heard the voices of Stoudenmire and his brother-in-law, Stanley "Doc" Cummings, his legs started to wobble and he fell backward, accidentally firing both shells into the air. Stoudenmire quickly pulled out his pistols and fired at Johnson eight times, severing his testicles. Johnson bled to death within a few minutes.

This started a feud between Stoudenmire and the Mannings. Within six days of his having started his job as town marshal, Stoudenmire had killed four men, one accidentally. Between the killing of Johnson and the following February, Stoudenmire killed another six men in shootouts during arrests. The city's crime rate dropped dramatically. His reputation, as both a lawman and a gunman, increased.

On February 14, 1882, James Manning killed "Doc" Cummings, supposedly while acting in self-defense after an earlier argument that evening had escalated. Manning claimed that Cummings had pulled his pistol and verbally threatened to kill him outside the saloon when an innocent bystander walked by. Cummings whirled and growled, "Now, are you not one of his friends?" The bystander squealed his innocence, but Cummings allowed him to go provided that he walked with his arms up in the air into the darkness of night. Cummings then turned and realized that Manning had gone back inside the saloon. Cummings entered and again verbally threatened to kill him. Manning left the bar briefly and appeared in the hallway. Armed with his pistols, Manning snapped, "We will settle this for now and all." In an instant, gunfire erupted from both sides. Hit, Cummings staggered out across a wooden sidewalk toppling backward onto the dusty street as he screamed in agony then died.

Manning was acquitted in a trial attended by a large number of local residents who were friends of the Mannings. This enraged Stoudenmire. Unfortunately for El Paso, Cummings had been the only man able to confront or control Stoudenmire's fierce temper. He began to publicly confront those responsible for James Manning's acquittal and caused many to avoid coming into town or visiting saloons for fear of running into an enraged Stoudenmire.

Despite his prowess and expertise with handguns, and his effectiveness as a lawman, Stoudenmire was still an 'outsider.' He was well respected by the Texas Rangers and the U.S. Marshals. However, locally, he had several things against him. He was not from El Paso, had no family there other than his own family and his now deceased brother-in-law; the Mannings had been in El Paso longer and had many friends in the general population as well as in high places in the city government. Stoudenmire had only two things in his favor; he had dramatically lowered El Paso's violent crime rate more than any who came before him, and people truly feared him.

On May 27, 1882, the town council announced the firing of Stoudenmire. He walked into the council hall, drunk, and dared them to take his guns or his job. He pulled and twirled his guns and threatened, "I can straddle every God-damned alderman on this council!" They attempted to calm him by telling him he could keep his job. However, after sobering up, he resigned on his own on May 29, 1882 and became a proprietor of the Globe Restaurant, which had formerly belonged to Cummings. He was then appointed Deputy U.S. Marshal for Western Texas and New Mexico Territory by U.S. Marshal Harrington Lee "Hal" Gosling.

== U.S. Marshal and death in shoot-out ==
For a few months, Stoudenmire served well as a Deputy U.S. Marshal. However, the feud was far from over. The Mannings, mainly George "Doc" Manning (died 1925), James Manning (died 1915), and Frank Manning (died 1925), were careful to never confront Stoudenmire alone. Despite their hatred of him, he had shown his skill with a gun on several occasions and this made them wary. On one instance, while standing out in the street, a drunken Stoudenmire mocked them, daring them to come outside and fight him. They remained inside a saloon while other residents attempted to convince Stoudenmire to go away and sleep off his intoxication. Eventually he grew tired, called the Mannings cowards, and left.

On September 18, 1882, the Mannings and Stoudenmire met in a local saloon, to make what they would call a "peace treaty" to end the feud. James Manning, believing things were settled, left. Stoudenmire started off saying, "Doc, someone or somebody has been going about telling lies...". Doc replied, "Dallas, you have not kept your word." "Who ever says I have not tells a damn lie," Stoudenmire roared. Manning and Stoudenmire drew their pistols and fired. Stoudenmire's friend tried to push both men, causing Stoudenmire to lose his balance and Doc's bullet hit Stoudenmire in his left arm. A second round barely penetrated Stoudenmire's skin because of papers folded heavily in his shirt pocket. Nonetheless, the second shot knocked Stoudenmire down. As he fell outside the doorway, he pulled one of his pistols with his right hand and shot "Doc" Manning in the arm. As Stoudenmire was firing, James Manning came from behind Stoudenmire and fired two rounds, one hitting a barber's pole, and the other hitting Stoudenmire behind the left ear, killing him. "Doc" Manning then commenced beating the dead man over the head with his own gun, before being restrained by James Manning.

A funeral ceremony for Stoudenmire was held at El Paso Lodge #130 A.F. & A.M. His wife, Isabella, later had his body shipped to Columbus, Texas for burial. All funeral expenses were paid for by the Masonic Lodge. Stoudenmire is buried in the Alleyton Cemetery in Colorado County, Texas.

=== Afterward ===
The Mannings stood trial for the murder, but were acquitted, again with a jury made up mostly of their friends. They continued to live in El Paso, and soon the killing of Dallas Stoudenmire was all but forgotten. When Assistant City Marshal Thomas Moad was killed while investigating a disturbance at a local brothel on July 11, 1883, Frank Manning was appointed to replace him. He only kept the job temporarily, as he often failed to arrest friends and acquaintances.

== Bibliography ==
- Metz, Leon Claire; 1979. Dallas Stoudenmire: El Paso Marshal. Norman, OK: University of Oklahoma Press. 162 p.
- Denny, W. John; 1956 "A Century of Freemasonry at El Paso". Kessinger Publishing, LLC. 48 p.

Police appointments
Preceded by Bill Johnson	City Marshal of El Paso, Texas; April 11, 1881–May 27, 1882	Succeeded by James B. Gillett
