= George Campbell (town marshal) =

George Washington Campbell (December 23, 1850 – April 14, 1881) was born in Greenup County Kentucky and was the youngest of five children. He moved to Texas in 1875 and by the end of 1876 he was appointed deputy sheriff of Clay County Texas. In November 1880 Campbell moved to El Paso, Texas, where he was named town marshal on December 1, 1880. He served from late 1880 until January 1881, when he was replaced by a new town marshal, Ed Copeland. Campbell was the last person killed by Dallas Stoudenmire in what would later be dubbed Four Dead in Five Seconds Gunfight that took place on April 14, 1881.

== The gunfight ==
The events leading up to the gunfight seem to have started with around 75 Mexicans riding into El Paso looking for two young vaqueros who had been killed. The mercenaries, paid by a wealthy Mexican ranch owner, were looking for two missing farm hands, Sanchez and Juarez, and 30 stolen cattle. Ben Schuster, the mayor of El Paso, had made an exception for the Mexicans, enabling them to enter the city limits with their guns.

A constable named Gus Krempkau, at the request of the Mexican posse, accompanied the Mexicans to the ranch of Johnny Hale, a local ranch owner and known cattle rustler, whose ranch was some 13 miles northwest of El Paso in the Upper Valley. The bodies of the two Mexicans were found in the bosque near Hale's ranch and the corpses were transported back to El Paso. The court in El Paso held an inquest into the deaths of the men when they returned to El Paso, and Krempkau, being fluent in Spanish, was required to act as an interpreter to the Mexicans.

=== Verdict of the Inquest ===
The verdict was that the two Mexicans, Sanchez and Juarez, were in that vicinity of Hale's ranch in an attempt to locate 30 stolen Mexican cattle. The court determined that the American cattle rustlers, among them Hale, feared the deceased were acting as scouts and would alert the larger Mexican group to their location. It was determined that two American cattle rustlers ambushed the 2 Mexicans during the night of April 13 or in the early morning of 14th.

A large crowd gathered in El Paso, including John Hale and his friend, former town Marshal George Campbell. There was animosity among Americans about the Mexicans being heavily armed within the city limit, but at the same time tensions were high among the Mexicans, who wanted justice for their two young men who had been killed. Constable Krempkau was fluent in Spanish and was inquired to interpret for the judge. An inquest was held in court. The court was adjourned and the crowd dispersed. The Mexicans, bringing the two bodies, quietly rode back to Mexico.

== Shooting begins ==
Constable Krempkau went to a saloon next door to retrieve his rifle and pistol. A confrontation erupted with ex-City Marshal George Campbell over comments allegedly made by Campbell about Krempkau's interpretations and his friendship with the Mexicans. John Hale, who was allegedly unarmed, was heavily intoxicated and upset with Constable Krempkau's involvement in the investigation. Hale pulled one of Campbell's two pistols and yelled, "George, I've got you covered!". He shot Krempkau, who then reeled backward. Slumping against a saloon door, Krempkau pulled out his own pistol.

At this moment, Marshal Dallas Stoudenmire, who had only started the job of town Marshal on April 11, but who had a considerable gunman reputation, and who was eating dinner at the "Globe Restaurant" across the street, ran out onto the street and pulled out his pistols. While running, Stoudenmire fired once, but the shot went wild and hit an innocent Mexican bystander who tried to run from the erupting incident. When John Hale peeked out from behind the pillar, Stoudenmire fired again, hitting Hale between his eyes, killing him instantly.

When Campbell saw Hale go down, he exited from cover with his pistol drawn yelling that it wasn't his fight. Constable Krempkau, still conscious and thinking Campbell had shot him, quickly fired his pistol at Campbell before losing consciousness. The first bullet fired by Krempkau struck Campbell's gun and broke Campbell's right wrist, the second hit him in the foot. Campbell screamed and scooped his gun with his left hand, Stoudenmire whirled and rapidly fired. Campbell dropped his gun, grabbed his stomach and toppled to the ground. After being shot Campbell reportedly looked up at Stoudenmire and stated "You big son of a b--ch, you murdered me." He would die the next morning. Constable Krempkau also died shortly after the gunfight.

== Bibliography ==
- Egloff, Fred R. (1982). El Paso Lawman G. W. Campbell. Creative Publishing Company ISBN 0-932702-22-8
