= Montgomery Building =

Montgomery Building may refer to

- Montgomery Building (El Paso, Texas), a building in El Paso, Texas
- Montgomery Building (Spartanburg, South Carolina), a ten-story highrise listed on the NRHP in Spartanburg County
