= Gus Krempkau =

Texan lawman

Gustav Krempkau (c. 1856 – April 14, 1881) was an El Paso County constable in the late 19th century in El Paso, Texas, during the climax of the "Wild West" era. He died in the Four Dead in Five Seconds Gunfight, which was overshadowed by the events of a few months later at the O.K. Corral. Little is known of his early life, but he is believed to have been about 25 years old when he was killed.

== The gunfight ==
On Thursday, April 14, 1881, only three days after El Paso received its sixth town marshal in 8 months, a gunfight took place which would be called the "Four Dead in Five Seconds Gunfight". This gunfight was well publicized in newspapers in cities as far away as San Francisco and New York. The events leading to the gunfight began a mile south, at the Rio Grande which divided the U.S. and Mexico. Roughly 75 heavily armed Mexican cowboys rode into El Paso. The Mexicans were on a quest for two missing young Mexican cowboys, Sanchez and Juarique, plus 30 missing cattle that were stolen from their ranch in Mexico. The missing cattle belonged to a wealthy Mexican rancher who hired the armed posse to locate them. El Paso County Constable Gus Krempkau accompanied the Mexican cowboys in locating the two young youths. Their bodies were discovered at the ranch of Johnny Hale, a rancher and cattle rustler, in the Upper Valley about 13 miles northwest of El Paso.

The two bodies were recovered and brought back to town. Records indicated that these young Mexican cowboys were in that vicinity in an attempt to locate the stolen cattle. It was not clear who had killed them, but it was likely that Hale and his men had rustled the cattle in question, then killed the young Mexican cowboys when they trailed the herd to Hale's ranch.

A large crowd gathered in El Paso, including John Hale and his friend, former town marshal George Campbell. There was animosity among Americans about the Mexicans being heavily armed within the city limit, but at the same time tensions were high among the Mexicans, who wanted justice for their two young men who had been killed. Constable Krempkau was fluent in Spanish and was inquired to interpret for the judge. An inquest was held in court. The court was adjourned and the crowd dispersed. The Mexicans, bringing the two bodies, quietly rode back to Mexico.

Constable Krempkau went to a saloon next door to retrieve his rifle and pistol. A confrontation erupted with ex-City Marshal George Campbell over comments allegedly made by Campbell about Krempkau’s interpretations and his friendship with the Mexicans. John Hale, who was allegedly unarmed, was heavily intoxicated and upset with Constable Krempkau’s involvement in the investigation. Hale pulled one of Campbell's two pistols and yelled, "George, I've got you covered!". He shot Krempkau, who then reeled backward. Slumping against a saloon door, Krempkau pulled out his own pistol.

At this moment, the new town marshal, known gunman Dallas Stoudenmire, who was eating dinner at the Globe Restaurant across the street, ran out onto the street and pulled out his pistols. While running, Stoudenmire fired once, but the shot went wild and hit an innocent Mexican bystander who tried to run from the erupting incident. When John Hale peeked out from behind the pillar, Stoudenmire fired again, hitting Hale between his eyes, killing him instantly.

When Campbell saw Hale go down, he exited from cover with his pistol drawn yelling that it wasn't his fight. Constable Krempkau, still conscious and thinking Campbell had shot him, quickly fired his pistol at Campbell before losing consciousness. The first bullet struck Campbell's gun and broke Campbell's right wrist, his second shot hit him in the foot. Campbell screamed and scooped his gun with his left hand, Stoudenmire whirled and rapidly fired. Campbell dropped his gun, grabbed his stomach and toppled to the floor. Both Campbell and Constable Krempkau died shortly thereafter.

== See also ==
- ODMP Memorial for Constable Krempkau
- Four Dead in Five Seconds Gunfight
- Dallas Stoudenmire
