= Constables in the United States =

In the United States, there is no consistent use of the office of constable throughout the states; use may vary within a state. A constable may be an official responsible for service of process: such as summonses and subpoenas for people to appear in court in criminal and/or civil matters. They can also be fully empowered law enforcement officers. Constables may have additional specialized duties unique to the office. In some states the constable is an elected or appointed position at the state or local level of local government. Their jurisdiction can vary from statewide to county/parish and local township boundaries based on the state's laws.

The office developed from its British counterpart during the colonial period. Prior to the modernization of law enforcement in the middle 19th century, local law enforcement was performed by constables and watchmen. Constables were appointed or elected at the local level for specific terms and, like their UK counterparts the Parish Constable, were not paid and did not wear a uniform. They were often paid a fee by the courts for each writ served and warrant executed. Following the example of the British Metropolitan Police established in 1829, the states gradually enacted laws to permit municipalities to establish police departments. This differed from the UK in that the old system was not uniformly abolished in every state. Often the enacting legislation of the state conferred a police officer with the powers of a constable, the most important of these powers being the common law power of arrest. Police and constables exist concurrently in many jurisdictions. Perhaps because of this, the title "constable" is not used for police of any rank. The lowest rank in a police organization would be officer, deputy, patrolman, trooper, and historically, private, depending on the particular organization.

In many states, constables do not conduct patrols or preventive policing activities. In such states the office is relatively obscure to its citizens.

A constable may in some jurisdictions be assisted by deputy constables as sworn officers or constable's officers as civil staff, usually as process servers. In some states, villages or towns, an office with similar duties is marshal.

== Alabama ==
In Alabama, a constable is traditionally elected from each election precinct. Counties may abolish the office of constable by county ordinance. Many have done so: as of 2015, only 24 of Alabama's 67 counties still had constables.

Alabama constables are peace officers and have full powers of arrest, stop and search within their county, except in certain counties which have had their constables' powers limited by act of the State Legislature (Etowah and Jefferson Counties). They are generally responsible for serving warrants and acting as process servers, as well as patrolling the streets and providing security for civic events. They are not funded from general tax revenues; instead, constables' fees are paid by the criminals they arrest.

== Alaska ==
In Alaska, a constable is an appointed official with limited police powers. The military police arm of the Alaska State Defense Force, a voluntary state defense force, is designated as the constabulary force of the state. This agency is empowered to act in a police capacity when called into service by the governor. Some official missions the constables have officially performed include port security after 9-11, disaster relief, and Alaska Pipeline patrols. They were put on initial alert to deploy to Bethel in 2007 when 9 of the 11 officers of the city's police department resigned in protest over a pay and benefits dispute with city officials. They were not ultimately needed for that mission and were never deployed. Unlike many so-called militias, many of which are voluntary and non-state affiliated, the Alaska State Defense Force is state-recognized under the state's authority to have a state-exclusive militia or guard, in addition to the National Guard of the Army and Air Force. Alaska also has a naval militia composed of reserve US Marine Corps and Navy personnel, who serve as needed, but not in conflict with their federal military reserve duties. The Alaska constables receive police training from the Alaska Department of Public Safety. They act in an official police capacity only when called into service by the State of Alaska, which has a broad statute governing citizen's arrests, which is why Alaska has Village Public Safety Officers (VPSOs) all of whom are fully academy-trained, employed by local tribal non-profit corporations and are deputized by the commissioner of public safety to make misdemeanor non-traffic arrests and charge for violations. Other similar officers are tribal police officers (TPOs) of local tribal communities and village police officers (VPOs) all of whom receive limited training. This is due to the scarce availability of law enforcement personnel in remote areas of the vast state.

== Arizona ==
In Arizona, a constable is an elected peace officer of the county for the justice precinct and must live in the precinct to which they are elected. The constable serves a four-year term and has similar powers, duties and authority as the sheriff. Sheriffs and constables are the only two elected peace officers in the State of Arizona. Constables have been part of Arizona since the territorial government was formed in 1864.

The authority of constables is defined by Arizona Revised Statutes Title 1, Section 215; Title 13, Section 105; Title 22, Section 131; as well as Title 13, Section 3804. Constables have similar powers, duties and authority as sheriffs, but their primary responsibility is to execute court orders for the justice of the peace or other competent authorities. Constables serve protective orders, summons and subpoenas, court orders, service of process, writs and arrest warrants, and act as court bailiffs. Constables are peace officers, but in Arizona do not perform general police functions such as patrols or criminal investigations. However, by virtue of their peace officer status, a constable may be required to take enforcement action to preserve life and property in immediate situations. Constables and their deputies have authority throughout their county, and any precinct in another county contiguous to their own precinct All deputy constables are required to be certified officers by state law, and some constables chose to become certified peace officers.

Constables are required to attend AZPOST approved basic training, and their expenses are paid by the county board of supervisors and various grants. Constables receive a salary from their respective counties based on the number of registered voters who reside in their precinct. Most Arizona counties have from two to five constables. Maricopa county has 26 constables, Pima county has 9 constables, and Pinal county has 6, while both La Paz county and Santa Cruz county have one constable each.

== Arkansas ==
In Arkansas, constable is an elected office at the township level, although they are also elected at the district level in some counties. although constables are municipally elected at either the township or discrict level, they are considered county officers. The office of constable, which is a partisan office, is guaranteed by the 1874 Constitution of Arkansas, which provides for the election of a constable in each township for a two-year term. Constables are peace officers with full police powers, similar to county sheriffs or police officers.

== California ==
Historically, constables in California were attached to the justice courts, the lowest tier of the state court system (whereas sheriffs served the county superior courts). Depending on the county, constables were either elected by popular vote or appointed by the county supervisors to a township (later a judicial district). Constables had full police powers by state law and carried out occasional to frequent patrol work in addition to service of process and serving arrest warrants.

Legislation in 1923 allowed the creation of municipal courts in cities with over 40,000 people, with marshals to enforce their orders and provide security. As populations grew, and municipal courts pushed out justice courts, constables were slowly replaced by marshals. Municipal marshals were consolidated into single county offices in 1970. By the late-1980s few, if any, constables remained. The state courts were unified in 2000, with the superior court fulfilling all judicial functions, and the office of constable was formally eliminated.

== Connecticut ==
There are two types of constables in Connecticut.

Special constables are appointed by towns. In general, they are appointed to serve as police officers and expected to have or complete the requirements of the Police Officer Standards and Training Council in order to do so. Special constables normally work under the supervision of a resident state trooper contracted by the town (a requirement of the Connecticut State Police if the town wishes their constables to be dispatched by the state police or have access to the radio and computer system of the state police). The system of resident state trooper and constables is used by many medium-sized towns as a cost-effective way of providing increased police patrols while the state police retain primary responsibility to provide additional levels of supervision, dispatch, detective, and other specialized services.

Constables who are elected officials are generally limited to serving civil process within the town they are elected by. Elections are held every two years, except communities which by local ordinance or charter have set the term of office at four years. While a small number of towns will also allow the constables to perform road traffic control and event security functions, most strictly prohibit their constables from acting in any official capacity on behalf of the town. The authority to act as a law enforcement officer by nature of their office was removed in 1984, at which time they became subject to the Police Officer Standards and Training Council requirements. In 1984 these requirements were for 480 hours of training, which could be completed in 120-hour-long "blocks" which were offered as part-time evening classes. With completion of each block came expansion of the types of law enforcement the officer could perform. While it was never common after 1984 to have elected constables with law enforcement powers, there were a few who did complete certification. As of 2007, POST requirements of 680 hours of training provided on a full-time basis for new officers, followed by 400 hours of training provided by a certified field training officer make completing the requirements to be a law enforcement officer impractical for elected constables.

Historically, constables had been the key office for providing law enforcement in rural Connecticut. Connecticut never developed a strong institution of county sheriffs providing general police services. From colonial times through the 1940s, town constables would work with two other town officials—the investigating grand juror and prosecuting grand juror—in the initial handling of criminal investigations, arrests, and the "binding over" of serious crimes from the town's justice court to a higher court. A series of reforms in regulations, statutes, and the state constitution in the 1950s and 1960s removed the involvement of towns in these matters. In towns without a local police chief, investigations became the exclusive responsibility of the Connecticut State Police, while state prosecutors took over the prosecution of cases, and the court system was flattened by the elimination of courts with criminal venue below the level of the superior court.

== Delaware ==
Transplanted from England to Delaware in the early colonial period, the constable's main responsibilities were keeping the peace, serving the courts, and executing court orders and process. Under the Duke of York's government the constable was elected from one of four overseers of the town or parish. He had the responsibility to pursue and apprehend offenders and bring them before the justice of the peace, whip, or punish offenders by order of the court, take bail for a person arrested, help to settle estates, and keep proper accounts of fines collected. Legislation relating to constables does not appear in the Delaware Laws until 1770. This act required constables at the end of their terms to return the names of three freeholders to the Court of General Sessions, who then appointed one to serve the next year. At least one constable was appointed for each hundred, and appointees had to be residents of the hundred in which they served. After 1832 the levy court of each county appointed the constables, although the governor could also fill appointments if levy court was in recess. The constable had a number of duties, many of which continue today. He executed all orders, warrants, and other process directed by any court, judge, or justice of the peace; ensured that the peace of the state be kept; arrested all persons committing riot, murder, theft, or breach of the peace, and carried them before a justice of the peace; attended elections to ensure that the peace be kept; and enforced the laws of the state.

Justice of the peace court constables are appointed by the chief magistrate. The constables' duties include execution of court orders, writs and warrants, serving summonses and subpoenas, collecting debts and fines, and providing courtroom security.

Any non-profit corporation, civic association, or governmental entity which has buildings and grounds open to the public may request for the appointment of Delaware State constables to serve as law enforcement officers in order to protect life and property. The board of examiners shall appoint and commission such numbers of sworn constables as it deems necessary to preserve the peace and good order of the state. To be approved by the board of examiners, a Delaware State constable must meet the minimum standards established by the Council on Police Training. The constable shall exercise the same powers as police officers while in the performance of the lawful duties of their employment.

Code enforcement constables are appointed by any county or municipal chief executive with limited authority to enforce only those ordinances pertaining to building, housing, sanitation, or public health codes. The Delaware SPCA may appoint animal control constables to enforce dog control ordinances and animal cruelty law.

== Georgia ==
In Georgia, constables are court officers whose powers and duties are: To attend regularly all sessions of magistrate court; to pay promptly over money collected by them to the magistrate court; to execute and return all warrants, summonses, executions, and other processes directed to them by the magistrate court; and to perform such other duties as are required of them by law or as necessarily appertain to their offices.

== Idaho ==
The office of constable was first established in Idaho in 1887; constables originally attended the justice of the peace courts and were officers of a precinct. Although the Idaho statutes still provide for the appointment of election constables to keep order during elections (Title 34, Chapter 11) and define constables as peace officers, the position was effectively eliminated in 1970, when the Idaho Legislature's Election Reform Act removed all provisions for the appointment of constables. As such, there are no longer any constables serving in Idaho.

== Kentucky ==
In Kentucky, constables are elected from each magistrate district in the state. There are between three and eight magistrate districts in each county. Under Section 101 of the Kentucky Constitution, constables are considered peace officers and have the same countywide jurisdiction as the county sheriff.

Prior to the 1970s, the main function of the constables was to provide court service and security to the justice of the peace courts. However, since these have been eliminated by judicial reform, the office of constable now has few real functions. Constables still have the power to execute warrants, subpoenas, summonses and other court documents, and are required to execute any court process given to them. Along with community policing and being of assistance to the law enforcement of that county. Constables are also permitted to carry firearms in the performance of their duties. Constables who took office prior to January 1, 2023 have full law enforcement powers, including power of arrest. All constables who take office after that date must undergo police training and certification in order to have law enforcement powers. On the approval of the fiscal court (the legislature of the county) they may equip their vehicles with oscillating blue lights and sirens.

Most constables in Kentucky are not paid a salary, but are paid fees for services rendered. However, state law provides for payment of an annual salary of $9,600 to constables in counties with a population of over 250,000; as of the 2000 U.S. census, this only applies in Louisville Metro/Jefferson County and the Lexington-Fayette Urban County government. The payment has become a point of controversy, since constables in Kentucky have few actual duties. The state has authorized a salary of up to $9,600 a year, but the Louisville Metro Council cut it to $100 a month, plus expenses.

Anyone standing for election as a constable must be at least 24 years of age, a resident of Kentucky for at least two years, and a resident of the county and district for at least a year prior to election. Since constables are constitutional peace officers they are exempt from attending the Department of Criminal Justice Training Academy in Richmond or state approved basic law enforcement training equivalent. Any constable, however, who takes office after January 1, 2023 must complete this training in order to make arrests, perform traffic stops, or otherwise carry out full law enforcement duties. The legal authority of any constable who chooses not to complete state approved law enforcement basic training will be limited to serving court documents and auxiliary police functions, such as traffic control.

The Kentucky Constables Association is affiliated with the National Constables Association.

== Louisiana ==
In Louisiana, constables are traditionally elected in each voting ward, which is a subdivision of a parish. Constables are peace officers and have full powers of arrest, stop and search within their ward. Some voting wards that are in large towns have a marshal instead of a constable, and these marshals serve the same role as a constable, although marshals are generally more pro-active in law enforcement matters. Not all large towns have the position of marshal though, as the City of Baton Rouge has a city constable. Constables in Louisiana are generally responsible for keeping the peace in the ward. They are paid a small monthly salary for their service.

== Maine ==
Constables in Maine are appointed by municipalities and are special police officers and also defined as law enforcement officers in Maine legislation. Constables are appointed to 1-year terms by local municipalities. Constables, depending on the terms of their appointment, may have full or limited peace officer powers, and may or may not have the authority to carry a firearm open or concealed.

Besides any general law enforcement authority they may possess, constables serve papers, process, writs and warrants for the district court.

== Massachusetts ==
The jurisdiction of constables in Massachusetts is in most cases limited to the cities and towns in which they are appointed or elected, with limited exceptions and they usually serve civil process. Constables may be employed by a municipality (usually via an election) or by a private entity (though they are still "appointed" by municipalities in the latter case). Massachusetts constables historically held extensive law enforcement powers and modern Massachusetts law enforcement is considered to derive their powers from the office of the constable.

Most constables were stripped of their law enforcement authority in 2023 by the Massachusetts POST Commission. If a constable wishes to exercise police powers, the POST Commission requires that the constable receive the same training as any other law enforcement officer in the Commonwealth of Massachusetts, undergo full background checks, and be employed by a statutorily-recognized "law enforcement agency" as a "law enforcement officer." As such, as of 2026, it is unclear if any Massachusetts constables are able to exercise any law enforcement authority. Most constables now exclusively serve civil process.

=== History ===
M.G.L. c. 41 s. 98 provides the chief and other police officers of all cities and towns shall have all the powers and duties of constables except serving and executing civil process, allowing them to exercise common law arrest powers, state police are given the same powers throughout the commonwealth under M.G.L. c. 25 s. 97. Although the service of civil process makes up a major portion of their duties Massachusetts constables formerly had broad law enforcement authority. The Massachusetts Supreme Judicial Court stated in Hartley v. Granville, "the general duties of a Constable are to be vigilant to preserve the peace, to prevent the commission of crime and to arrest all offenders who might be arrested without a warrant and to procure warrants in other instances of crimes committed." Hartley also states, constables "are not expected to devote a considerable portion of their time to the work of their office or to quit his ordinary occupation to act as a detective and search for offenders. In this regard they stand on a basis quite different from the members of an organized police force." The Municipal Police Institute (now known as the Municipal Police Training Committee) issued a report in May 1977, on the powers of constables noting that modern police not only evolved from constables but they derive their common law powers arrest from constables, also stating "Constables still possess extensive law enforcement powers to this day".

Constables require a bond as condition for faithful performance of their duties, and M.G.L. c. 23 s. 1 and 8 provides for their bond to be put in suit for failure to perform their duties by persons so aggrieved.

=== Constables in modern Massachusetts ===
In 2023, guidance was officially released by the nascent Massachusetts POST Commission (POST-C) which de facto stripped constables of criminal law enforcement powers. The POST-C — empowered by a 2021 statute to create standards for Massachusetts law enforcement officers (LEOs) — determined that any person person effecting an "arrest" (other than a "citizen's arrest") would be deemed a LEO by statute, and thus be statutorily required to be certified by the POST-C. The POST-C defines an "arrest" as:

An actual or constructive seizure or detention of a person, performed with the intention to effect an arrest and so understood by the person detained. For purposes of applying this definition, the following shall constitute seizures: an application, to the body of a person, of physical force that objectively manifests an intent to restrain; a show of authority, through words or conduct, that a reasonable person would consider coercive; and an exercise of official powers that is facilitated by the use or display of a weapon.

The POST-C further opined that:

The following individuals may not execute any type of arrest[...] or otherwise perform police duties and functions: [...]An individual serving as [...] a constable [...] but is not certified.

Following the issuance of POST-C guidance, municipalities including Worcester and Haverhill passed ordinances requiring municipal constables to obtain POST-C certification in order to serve in such positions. POST-C certification requires full background checks; a "full-time," MPTC-approved academy; and annual training, along with POST-C recertification every five years.

However, POST-C further asserts:

A constable who is not endorsed by a law enforcement agency may apply for certification, and be granted certification if warranted [...h]owever [...] that certification would be active only while the individual serves as a "law enforcement officer" for a "law enforcement agency."

Thus, as of 2023, constables (both private and municipal) must, in order to exercise law enforcement powers; obtain a POST-C certification and be employed by a statutorily-designated "law enforcement agency" as a "law enforcement officer." Without such prerequisites, a Massachusetts constable would be limited to, per POST-C, the "mere service of papers."

== Michigan ==
Upon gaining statehood, constables continued to be appointed at the county level as had been done when Michigan was a territory. The constitution of 1850, however, required that each township elect at least one but not more than four constables. The constitution of 1908 continued the requirement. With few exceptions cities also elected constables by ward. In addition to serving the justice courts of their county, "constables have always been peace officers ... in the territory of their constituents," and, being constitutional officers, the legislature was without authority to limit the constables powers as they existed at common law. Allor v. Wayne County Auditor. 43 Mich. 76 (1880). However their role was vastly altered upon adoption of the constitution of 1963 when their office was deleted as was the office of justice of the peace. They were not named as officers of the new district court. And by the end of the 1970s their election was no longer statutorily mandated. A Michigan Commission on Law Enforcement Standards (MCOLES) certification became required if they were to perform general peace officer duties. As of 2007 there were very few elected city constables and less than 10% of Michigan's 1242 townships continue to elect constables.

== Mississippi ==
In Mississippi, constables are county law enforcement officers elected in partisan elections to four-year terms from single-member districts in each county. Each district corresponds to a Justice Court district of the county, with a minimum of 2 districts for counties with populations of 35,000 or less, up to 5 districts for counties with a population of 150,000 or more.

The duties of constables are to act as general peace officers in the county, to serve civil and criminal process, execute warrants, and provide security for the justice courts. As with other law enforcement officers in the state, they must attend an initial law enforcement training at a program approved by the Board on Law Enforcement Officers Standards and Training, as well as annual continuing education training.. Constables do not receive a regular salary from the county, but are paid fees for serving process, and may also be paid a fee or per-diem by the county for other duties, such as serving as a bailiff for the justice courts during criminal trials.

All counties are required to provide their constables with at least two complete uniforms, some type of motor vehicle identification which clearly indicates that the motor vehicle is being used by a constable in his official capacity, and a blue flashing light for use on official duty.

== Nevada ==
=== Basic authority ===
Constables in Nevada are elected peace officers who have statewide powers pursuant to NRS 289.150, but 2015 legislation and further legislation in 2019 placed significant restrictions on those powers. Their peace officer power now is restricted to a) carrying out their official duties, b) preventing harm to a person or apprehending someone who has committed a crime against a person, or c) with permission from a sheriff or chief of police.

Constables must be Nevada POST certified Category I or Category II within 1 year of being sworn in, in order to keep their peace officer status and remain in office if they are from mid-sized townships, defined as those constables elected from a township of 15,000 ore more, but less than 100,000. Urban constables, defined as those constables elected from townships with a population of more 100,000 must be certified before they may file to run for office. In some rural Nevada constabularies, constables maintain POST status and others do not. All deputy constables must be POST certified in urban townships; in rural townships, they do not have to be certified, but if they are not, they may not carry weapons or exercise peace officer powers.

=== Hansen case ===
There was some confusion over whether Nevada state law mandated that constables shall be peace officers regardless of what other provisions of state law require, the opposite; i.e., that state law requires that constables be certified peace officers to remain in office, or some nebulous legal point in between. Some of the confusion resulted from a 2002 elections case before the Nevada 8th Judicial District in Clark County, Hansen v Bell et al.. In Hansen the 8th District ordered a candidate's name to be removed from the ballot in the election for Constable of the Township of Henderson because the candidate would not be twenty-one years old before taking office. An administrative regulation governing peace officer certification set the minimum age requirement at twenty-one on peace officers. The primary statute the district court relied on was NRS 258.070 which states that constables shall [emphasis added] be peace officers in their township. On appeal, the Nevada Supreme Court reversed the 8th District. Furthermore, the Nevada Supreme Court ruled that absent a statutory revision by the legislature, elected constables (but not their deputies) were exempt from the provisions of NRS 289.550, the primary statute establishing peace officer standards. Case law pursuant to new legislation in 2015, most of the case is now moot.

=== Responsibilities ===
The primary duties of constables are to act as a civil operations agency. This includes the service of civil process in both the justice and district courts such as letters of demand, summons and complaints, legal petitions, civil subpoenas, public notices, eviction notices, or any other process in civil cases as well as civil enforcement including wage and bank garnishments, writs of execution, attachment and possession, orders in aid of execution, eviction orders, civil bench warrants, cash keepers, till taps and other property seizures and conduct public auctions of both real and personal property. How broad a menu of services offered will, however, vary from one constable to another.

=== Additional information ===
Constables in Nevada serve a four-year term. In Nevada the office of constable was the only partisan elected office below the county level but is now non-partisan like sheriffs in Nevada. The office is not fully funded by taxpayers, but supplemented by fees collected for various forms of service. Constables are variously paid only token salaries and earn most of their compensation through fees or are paid a higher fixed salary but earn no fees. As of 2022 constables for the townships of Humboldt, North Las Vegas, and Henderson are on fixed salaries. The office in Las Vegas Township has been taken over by the county sheriff. Not all townships have constables and the office is in abatement in most counties.

== New Jersey ==
The position of constable in the State of New Jersey no longer exists. In recent years, criticism has arisen calling out the position as "antiquated and potentially dangerous", and a report form the New Jersey State Commission of Investigation was released in December 2021 recommending the abolition of the position. In January 2024, Governor Phil Murphy signed Assembly Bill 5281/Senate Bill 2341 into law, which eliminated the constable position, removed statutory references to constables, repealed various parts of statutory law, and implemented the recommendations given in the NJSCI report concerning the elimination of the position.

When they did exist, per NJ Revised Statute § 40A:9-120, constables were citizens appointed at the municipal level, and were required to merely be "...residents and qualified voters of the municipality for at least 3 years prior to their appointment". Constables were considered "peace officers", which according to the NJSCI report was not clearly defined but generally understood to mean "...recognized as empowered to act as an officer for the detection, apprehension and arrest of offenders against the law." The report further stated that though constables did have this authority, they "...receive[d] no instruction, guidance or preparation in doing so", and were permitted by some municipalities to purchase badges and uniforms indistinguishable from those of regular sworn police officers despite not being bound by any requirements for training through the Police Training Commission. The specific duties that the constable would undertake was at the discretion of the municipality, ranging from being merely ceremonial in nature to doing crowd control at events and enforcing noise ordinances.

== New York ==
Constables serve at the pleasure of the local towns and villages, usually in a civil aspect for the courts. However, constables are considered law enforcement officers under New York State law. Their powers can be limited by each jurisdiction.

Constables are considered peace officers, have arrest powers within their jurisdiction while on duty, and must complete peace officer training as approved by the NY Division of Criminal Justice Services.

There are restrictions on whether appointed constables can have peace officer powers based on whether the municipality is a town or village and the number of residents. If a constable is not appointed as a constable with peace officer powers, they can only serve civil process.

== North Carolina ==
Constables were abolished in North Carolina in the mid-1960s. They were peace officers who served under the justice of the peace (JP) of each voting precinct. In the 1960’s and before, constables were often the only law enforcement officers in a county, other than the sheriff and deputies, especially before many municipalities established police departments and before the establishment of the NC Highway Patrol in 1929. They were not salaried but received a fee of several dollars for each court order served from the presiding JP of their precinct. Constables were elected to four-year terms alongside that of the JP of their precinct and while they had full peace officer powers, their daily duties focused on serving orders of the JP and providing bailiff service to the JP court. In this revamping of the NC legal system, district court judges were required to be licensed attorneys at the same time that the office of constable, along with JP, mayor's court and city jail systems were phased out with the new NC court system changes of the mid-1960s. JP's were replaced by magistrates and the duties of constable were absorbed by sheriffs. Some cities continue to maintain temporary lockups, but city jails were abolished as a rule. Also in this set of changes, coroners who were elected judicial death investigators were generally replaced by medical examiners who were required to be a medical doctor, osteopathic physician, dentist, lawyer or veterinarian in the new system, though coroner still exists on the books in many NC counties.

== Ohio ==
The appointment of constables is authorized by the Ohio Revised Code, which defines several roles for them. Constables serve as police officers of some small towns and townships, or as officers of some minor courts. A "special constable" may also be appointed by a municipal court judge for a renewable one-year term upon application by any three "freeholders" (landowners) of the county, who are then responsible for paying the special constable.

Duly sworn Ohio constables are considered peace officers under Ohio law, as are sheriffs, municipal police officers, state park rangers, Highway Patrol troopers, etc., and have full law-enforcement authority within their jurisdictions (The Ohio Administrative Code defines a township constable's jurisdiction as statewide). With some exceptions, constables must post bonds and undergo police training. They are required to serve court papers when so ordered, and to apprehend and bring to justice any lawbreakers or fugitives, suppress riots or unlawful assemblies, enforce state law and generally keep the peace.

Under the Ohio Revised Code, counties may have sworn police "special constables" at their county fair grounds. Cuyahoga County Fair Grounds in Berea Ohio has established a police department under this section and the "special constables" are sworn in by the Berea Municipal Court Judge.

== Pennsylvania ==
Constables in Pennsylvania are elected peace officers. In fact, Pennsylvania State Constables were the first form of law enforcement for the State of Pennsylvania.

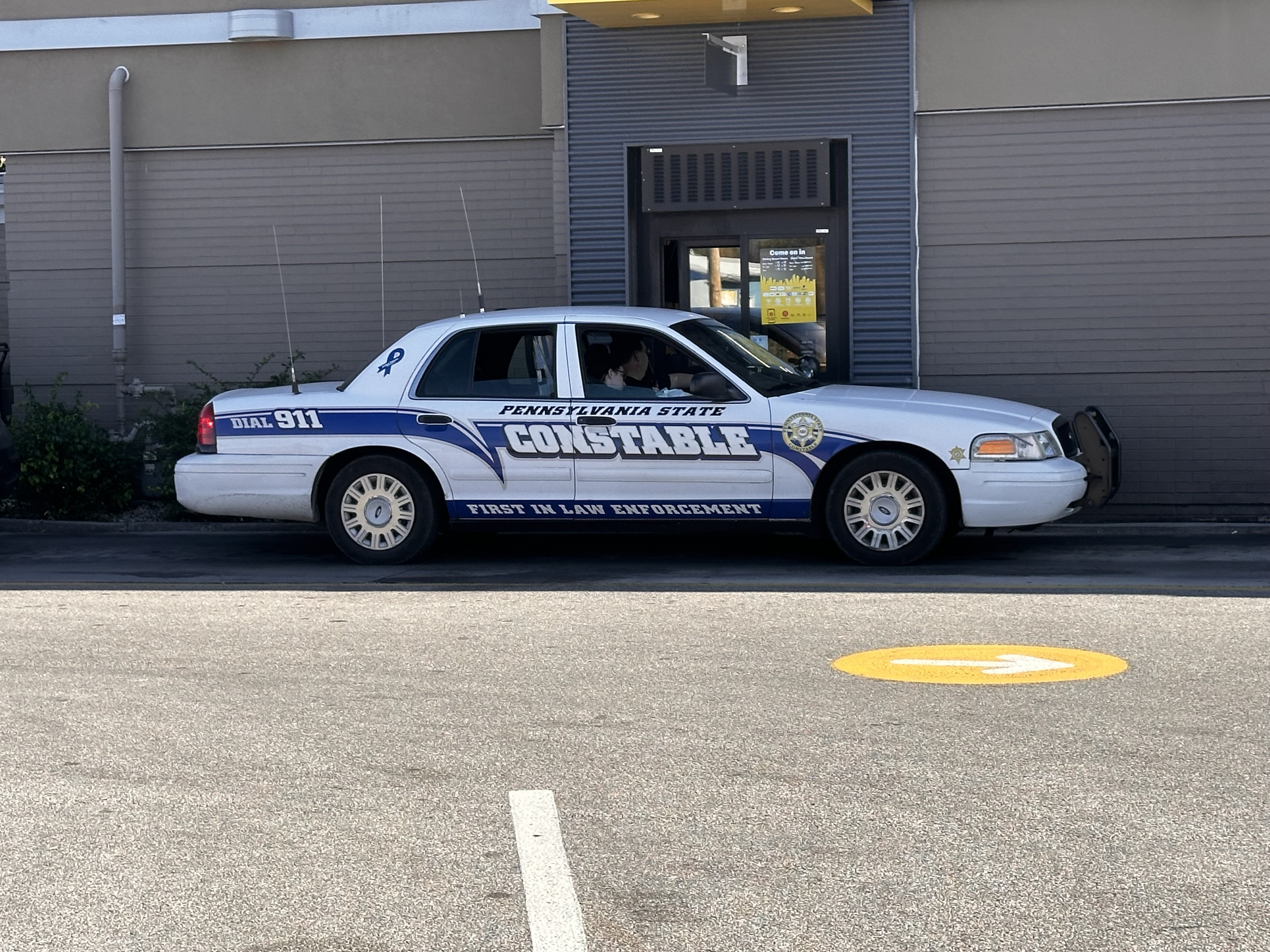
A Pennsylvania constable at a McDonald's drive-through

Constables in Pennsylvania are elected and serve six-year terms. They are peace officers by virtue of the office they hold. Upon completion of Act 49 certification and training, they may also serve as the law-enforcement arm of the court. Constables primarily serve the district courts but may also assist in serving the common pleas court, when requested by the sheriff.

As public officials, constables are required to file an annual statement of financial interests with the Pennsylvania State Ethics Commission.

Each constable may, with approval of the president judge in the county the constable is elected in, appoint deputies to work under their authority. Each deputy is given the same authority as the constable, but serves upon assignment of the elected constable.

The duty of the constable is to uphold the law fairly and firmly; to pursue and bring to justice those who break the law; to keep the peace; to protect, help, and reassure the community; and to be seen to do all this with integrity, common sense, and sound judgment.

Under Pennsylvania law, constables are public officers, elected or appointed to their position in accordance with the laws of the elections.

A constable is a sworn law enforcement/peace officer that can arrest for any violation of Pennsylvania Crimes Code via statutory power of arrest granted to them by Title 44 and status as a Peace Officer via Title 18 or by warrant anywhere in the Commonwealth.

A constable is also an officer empowered to carry out the business of the statewide district court system, by serving warrants of arrest, mental health warrants, transporting prisoners, service of summons, complaints and subpoenas, and enforcing protection from abuse orders as well as orders of eviction and judgement levies.

Constables are also responsible for maintaining order at the election polls and ensuring that no qualified elector is obstructed from voting, Constables are the only law enforcement officials permitted at the polls on election day.

While constables primarily serve the courts, they belong to the executive branch of government.

Constables are elected at the municipal level, however state law governs constables and they have statewide authority, thus the title became "state constable".

Constables are empowered to enforce both criminal and civil laws, although there is current contention on whether or not they meet the definition of police officer, despite being specifically mentioned in the definition in multiple places within the Pennsylvania Consolidated Statutes such as Title 3 and clearly meeting the definition of police officer in the PA Rules of Criminal Procedure and meeting the definition of Peace Officer within Title 18, the Pennsylvania Crimes Code. Currently, there is a court case in En Banc hearing as to whether or not constables meet the definition of Police Officer in Title 74, the PA Motor Vehicle Code (Commonwealth V Wiggs) and as such whether or not they can utilize red and blue emergency lights. However, constables can already enforce certain parts of Title 75, such as DUI (Commonwealth V Allen)

In Boroughs that have been divided into wards, there is the office of high constable, which is a position where the High Constable may perform duties regarding regulations of the constables and deputy constables within the borough, similar to a police chief. In townships or boroughs without wards, those duties fall on the elected constable to supervise their deputy or deputies.

== Rhode Island ==
The primary duties of constables in Rhode Island are to act as a civil operations agency. This includes the service of civil process in both the justice and district / family courts such as letters of demand, summons and complaints, legal petitions, civil subpoenas, public notices, eviction notices, or any other process in civil cases as well as civil enforcement including wage and bank garnishments, writs of execution, attachment and possession, orders in aid of execution, eviction orders, civil bench warrants, cash keepers, till taps and other property seizures and conduct public auctions of both real and personal property. How broad a menu of services offered will, however, vary from one constable to another. As of late Constables in Rhode Island are allowed to carry guns while carrying out their duties of service

== South Carolina ==
In South Carolina, a state constable is a law enforcement officer who is either a uniformed or plainclothes law enforcement officer employed by one of the departments of the state government, a retired police officer, or a volunteer reserve police officer. Officers may be variously described as "state constables", "special state constables", "department of public safety special constables" and "magistrates' constables". State constables are appointed by the Governor of South Carolina, and regulated by the South Carolina Law Enforcement Division.

== Tennessee ==
In Tennessee, constable is an elected position with full power of arrest and is a state peace officer. The Tennessee Constitution was amended in 1978 so as not to require counties to have this office. Prior to this point, it was mandatory to elect constables in each county. Subsequent statutory law has allowed its continuance in certain counties, with the stipulation that there be no more than half as many constables in a county as there are county commissioners in that county, except in counties where the general law provides for an exception by county population brackets. Constables are elected to four-year terms in August, many of which are the years coincident with presidential elections, but not all. Some constable elections, as in Greene County, are held during the presidential mid-terms. Unexpired terms may be filled by special election, but such special election must be held coincidentally with another scheduled election. An unexpired term may also be filled by an appointee elected by that county's legislative body. Candidates for elected county office are not required to declare a party to run in some counties, in which case all seeking the office appear on the ballot in the general election, while in the counties where the county offices are elected on a partisan basis, candidates may seek a party's nomination to the office in a primary election or skip the process of being nominated by a party. In those counties, candidates may run as independents.

== Texas ==
The Texas Constitution of 1876 (Article 5, Section 18) provides for the election of a constable in each precinct of a county, and counties may have between four and eight precincts each depending on their population. Currently, the term of office for Texas constables is four years. However, when vacancies arise, the commissioners empower police officers with county-wide jurisdiction and thus, may legally exercise their authority in any precinct within their county and adjacent counties; however, some constables' offices limit themselves to providing law enforcement services only to their respective precinct, except in the case of serving civil and criminal process. Constables and their deputies may serve civil process in any precinct in their county and any contiguous county and can serve warrants anywhere in the state.

The duties of a Texas constable generally include providing bailiffs for the justice of the peace courts within their precinct and serving process issued therefrom and from any other court. Moreover, some constables' offices limit themselves to only these activities but others provide patrol, investigative, and security services as well. Constables have full police powers.

In 2000, there were 2,630 full-time deputies and 418 reserve deputies working for the 760 constables' offices in Texas. Of this number, 35% were primarily assigned to patrol, 33% to serving process, 12% to court security, and 7% to criminal investigations. The Harris County Precinct 4 and 5 Constables' Offices are the largest constables' offices in Texas with over 600 deputies each.

== Utah ==
In the State of Utah, the constable is one of the first established law enforcement officers in state history.

Constables, and their respective deputies, are public servants and serve and enforce civil and criminal process for state institutions, litigators, courts, private citizens, and prosecutors. Additionally, they conduct special investigations and provide judiciary security services for Utah's justice courts as bailiffs. They are appointed by municipalities throughout Utah and may serve multiple terms. Constables and their deputies attend the police academy and are certified and sworn peace officers, although not tasked with "general law enforcement" duties. They possess statewide law enforcement jurisdiction and commonly serve summons and complaints, information, protective orders, stalking injunctions, subpoenas, warrants, writs, subpoenas, eviction orders, and orders to show cause. Additionally, they may make probable cause arrests or arrests pursuant to a warrant of arrest.

Constables, and their deputies, are often uniformed similar to other law enforcement officers although, the types of law enforcement operations each constable's office conducts may vary by city and county ranging from civil process and court order enforcement, such as writ service, to criminal matters and bailiff duties.

== Vermont ==
In Vermont, constables are generally elected by the town. They are charged with service of process; the destruction of unlicensed or dangerous dogs or wolf-hybrids, and of injured deer; removal of disorderly people from town meetings; collection of taxes, when no tax collector is elected; and other duties. Constables have full law enforcement authority unless the town votes to either remove the authority or require training before such authority is exercised. Cities and villages may also have constables. Their duties and method of selection are governed by the corporation's charter.

Effective July 1, 2010, town clerks must certify constables are duly elected or appointed and the town has not voted to limit the constable's authority to engage in enforcement activities. Further, constables must certify they have successfully completed a basic training course and will complete the required annual in-service training.

== Virginia ==
In Virginia, except for civil matters, "[t]he police force of a locality is hereby invested with all the power and authority which formerly belonged to the office of constable at common law," and some cities such as Norfolk, Virginia, continue to have an office of a "high constable."

== West Virginia ==
David F. Green of Davy, West Virginia, was the last person to hold the elected office of constable in West Virginia. The office of Constable was abolished in West Virginia in 1976.
