= Havering Parks Constabulary =

Jurisdictional structure
- Operations jurisdiction: England, UK
- Legal jurisdiction: Parks and open spaces within the London Borough of Havering
- Governing body: Havering London Borough Council
- Constituting instrument: section 18, Ministry of Housing and Local Government Provisional Order Confirmation (Greater London Parks and Open Spaces) Act 1967
- General nature: Civilian police
- Specialist jurisdiction: Environment, parks, heritage property

Operational structure
- Headquarters: Raphael Park, Romford, Parks Protection Service, RM2 5EB,
- Constables: 5

Facilities
- Stations: 1

Website
- Official website of the Havering Parks Protection Service

The Havering Parks Constabulary is a body of constables responsible for policing the parks and open spaces of the London Borough of Havering.

== Organisation and Duties ==
=== Constables ===
The Constabulary is part of Havering Parks Protection Service, and works seven days a week.

=== Uniformed Support Officers ===
The Service also includes Uniformed Support officers and a Parks Operative Gate Team dedicated to locking and unlocking various park gates.

=== Headquarters ===
The Constabulary and support team are based at the Service's headquarters in Raphael Park, but use motorbikes and off-road vehicles to travel throughout the borough.

=== Duties ===
The Parks Constabulary protects and policies Havering park, occasionally they help outside the park in serious conditions.

== Powers ==
=== Constables ===
Members of the constabulary are sworn in as constables under article 18 of the Greater London Parks and Open Spaces Order 1967, meaning they have powers of a constable to deal with bye-laws relating to parks and open spaces under their control. Providing a police service and as such do have the powers of arrest, power to seize illicit drugs, carry weapons (such as batons) etc.

Generally in London, parks police/constabularies will pass on all serious crime to the local territorial force, which in this case is the Metropolitan Police to investigate.

== Vehicles and equipment ==
Havering Parks Constabulary use 4x4 marked with "POLICE" and the Parks Constabulary crest, as well as blue and yellow battenburg markings, blue flashing lights and a spotlight.

The motorcycles are also brightly marked and hold the Parks Constabulary crest and blue lights.

=== Uniform ===
The constables wear a typical British police uniform, including:

- Black peaked cap with black and white chequered cap band & force capbadge
- White shirt and black tie
- Black jacket
- Black trousers
- Black boots.

Duty belts, stab vests, high-visibility clothing and motorbike protective clothing are worn where necessary.

== See also ==
- Law enforcement in the United Kingdom
- List of law enforcement agencies in the United Kingdom, Crown Dependencies and British Overseas Territories
- Park police
