= El Paso Street =

Street in El Paso, Texas, USA

Coordinates: 31.764°N 106.495°W

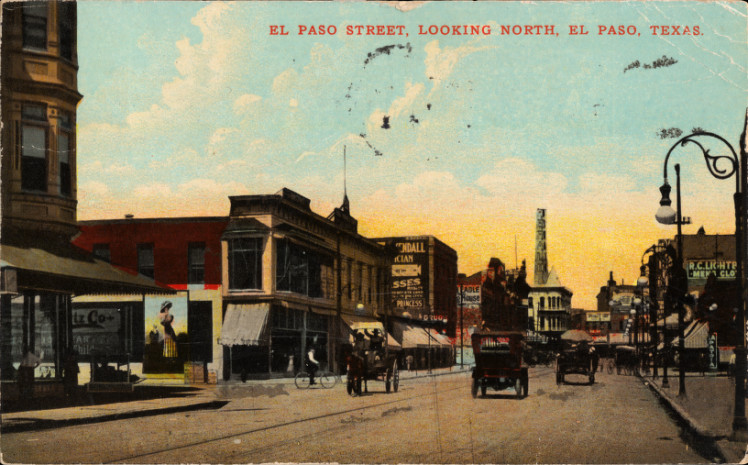
El Paso Street on a postcard, c. 1916

El Paso Street is a street in El Paso, Texas, United States. El Paso Street leads to a vehicular and pedestrian bridge into Ciudad Juárez, Chihuahua, Mexico and is owned by the City of El Paso The street is well known as a shopping area serving both Mexican and American shoppers.
