= Pennsylvania State Constables =

State peace officers

Pennsylvania Constables
- Example of one patch design used to identify State Constables (patch is not uniform across the state)
- Type: Judicial Officer
- Status: Elected for 6 Years
- Residence: District may cover a City, a Township, a Borough, or a Ward
- Term length: 6 years
- Constituting instrument: 44 Pa. C.S. § 71
- Formation: 1681

The office of the Pennsylvania Constable is a municipally elected, sworn law enforcement officer throughout the Commonwealth of Pennsylvania.

Pennsylvania Constables are elected in each borough, township, and city ward in the Commonwealth—except in Philadelphia (although constables certified through PCCD may still operate in the City of Philadelphia) — and serve six-year terms. Constables may be appointed by the Court of Common Pleas of the county to serve out a term when an elected position becomes vacant.

== Role in Pennsylvania government ==
A Pennsylvania State Constable is a sworn peace officer who is directly elected by and answerable to the voters of their borough, city, ward, or township.

A court may summon a constable to appear before it and direct the constable to investigate a complaint of a violation of law.

A constable is prospective employing law enforcement agency that shall conduct a thorough background investigation on any applicant for deputy constable.

In the event of a vacancy, the court of common pleas of the county of the vacancy may appoint a constable. The common pleas court may also inquire into the official conduct of the constable for failure to discharge official duties or other violations and suspend or remove the constable from judicial assignments.

Constables are authorized by statute to perform judicial services for the judicial branch after being trained and certified by the Constables' Education and Training Program administered by The Pennsylvania Commission on Crime and Delinquency, but are not an officer of the judicial branch, only the executive branch. Constables thus certified for judicial duty are empowered to serve civil and criminal complaints, summonses, and notices for the minor judiciary, levy personal property for public sale to satisfy judgments, execute orders of possession and ejectment, execute warrants of arrest, effectuate the payment of fines, take custody of and convey defendants and incarcerated prisoners, and provide for courthouse security.

Constables are charged with keeping order at the election polls and ensuring that no qualified voter is obstructed from voting. Constables are the only law enforcement officer permitted at the polls on election day, excepting those requested by the constable or judge of election for assistance. Constables are empowered to arrest without a warrant for felony crimes, offenses against any law for the protection of forests and timber land, any witnessed violation of any borough ordinance for which a fine or penalty is imposed, any unlawful act endangering personal security or property, and breaches of the peace committed in their presence, anywhere in the Commonwealth. Constables are "charged with conservation of the peace, and whose business it is to arrest those who have violated it... ."

Constables may collect taxes under a warrant issued by the tax collector.

Constables may execute an arrest warrant issued by a coroner.

== Powers ==
The office of constable gives ordinary persons extraordinary powers. The primary powers of the Pennsylvania State Constable and their deputies are established through common law and Pennsylvania statues. The Pennsylvania Constable is a person elected to the public office of Constable. Constables, by virtue of their office, are police officers. Constables are the oldest law enforcement in the Commonwealth of Pennsylvania.

Title 44 of Act 49 of 2009. This statute provides the authority to serve process for the Unified Judicial System of Pennsylvania, including serving summons, subpoenas, orders, judgment levies, and making arrests by warrant anywhere in the Commonwealth, make arrests without warrant for persons believed to be committing an offense against any law for the protection of forests and timberland and, in boroughs, make arrests without warrant for breaches of the peace committed in their presence. Additionally, where there is no coroner in commission in a county where a sheriff is a party to a suit instituted in a court of the Commonwealth, a constable may be directed by the courts to perform the authorized duties of the coroner.

They are also granted additional powers by various statutes. They may direct traffic, and seize registration plates and cards on behalf of the Pennsylvania Department of Transportation. They may also seize and process any dog which is found running at large, and humanely kill any dog at large in a rabies quarantine area on behalf of the Pennsylvania Department of Agriculture.

Following a recent Pennsylvania Superior Court ruling in the case of Commonwealth V. Allen, 206 A.3d 1123, 2019 Pa. Super. 88 (Pa. Super. Ct. 2019), the Court ruled that Constables have legal authority to detain individuals suspected of DUI offenses.

Constables are exempt from licensing requirements for concealed carry of a firearm. Although the right of individuals to bear arms in Pennsylvania for self-defense shall not be questioned, constables or their deputies must be certified and firearms-qualified as required under Act 49, Title 44, Chapter 71 - Constables, Section 7148 - Use of Firearms, to perform judicial duties.

== Statutory Duties ==
Constables are authorized to maintain the peace and to make arrests for breaches of the peace and certain crimes committed in their presence. Additionally, Constables are required by Election Law and PA statute to maintain order at election polls and ensure that no qualified elector is obstructed from voting. Constables are the only peace officers permitted at the polls on Election Day.

== Contracting Opportunity ==
=== Training ===
Constables and Deputy Constables may complete basic training administered by the Pennsylvania Commission on Crime and Delinquency and receive certification in order to perform judicial duties on behalf of the Court System. Initial training consist of 120 hours.

The initial basic training course consists of classroom instructions on the use of force, professional development, civil law, criminal law, prisoner transport, courtroom security, defensive tactics, use of OC spray and baton, mechanics of arrest, the role of the Constable, and crisis intervention. Completion of this mandatory course authorizes him or her to perform judicial duties. A separate basic firearms course consists of intensive classroom and range instruction. Successful completion of this course authorizes him or her to carry a firearm while performing judicial duties.

Each year, constables must complete a continuing education course to maintain their certification and an annual qualification course to maintain their firearms certification.

=== Deputy constables ===
==== General deputies ====
With the approval of the president judge of the county in which the constable is elected, each constable may appoint deputies to work under his authority. These deputies are granted the same authority and powers as the appointing constable but serve at their pleasure.

==== Election deputies ====
Additionally, a constable may appoint "Election Day" deputy constables to their statutory to preserve the peace at all polling places. These deputies are granted limited authority and are appointed before each polling day.

== Controversy ==
=== Media coverage ===
Controversy over the role of elected constables in the Commonwealth of Pennsylvania has been raised by the print media, including the Associated Press.

One Associated Press series reviewed the constabulary's legal status and asserted that, as in many elected positions, (i) there are no minimum qualifications to hold the office, (ii) the system may be open for abuse, and (iii) that statewide changes had not been carried out on at least two occasions.

Some of the incidents highlighted by the press include:

- In November 2011, a The Patriot-News (online PennLive) article featured two Pennsylvania State Constables, one from Cumberland County and another from Dauphin County, who were upset over a new PennDOT policy that prohibited their access to free municipal license plates.
- In February 2007, New Kensington police charged a Westmoreland County constable with drunken driving after a crash in which the constable was injured.
- In February 2005, a Chester County constable issued his letter of resignation to Chester County's President Judge with the understanding that, in exchange, he would not be prosecuted for any sexual assault charges arising from his transport of a female prisoner.
- In June 2003, a western Pennsylvania constable was indicted for allegedly lending his badge to a German man who was attempting to avoid airport security. The constable then was accused of lying about his role in the incident to federal agents. He was later exonerated and found innocent on all counts.
- Constables who fatally shot three pet dogs in Allentown in 2003 agreed to settle a lawsuit for $320,000. They had been serving warrants for unpaid parking tickets.
- A Cambria County constable was a known leader of the Ku Klux Klan but continued in his constable post.
- Lehigh County Constable, Howard "Chip" Altemos, was charged with aggravated assault after shooting a fleeing unarmed man who was wanted for failure to appear in court for traffic violations.

=== Removed or disciplined constables ===
- Kelly Deardorff, Elected Constable from York County – Deardorff pleaded guilty to failing to file federal income taxes from 2001 to 2005. According to Federal Prosecutors, Deardorff did not report income received from his activities as a State Constable. On February 5, 2008, Deardorff admitted that he earned more than $680,000 over those five years and did not file his tax returns. He was sentenced to 13 months in Federal Prison with a year of Federal supervision after that.
- Thomas L. Holt, Elected Constable from Bernville, Berks County – Thomas L. Holt was charged with submitting false bills for reimbursement for arresting and transporting people to court wanted on warrants. However, Berks County prosecutors alleged that those people paid their fines directly at District Court and did not even meet the constable. Berks County President Judge Jeffrey L. Schmehl issued an order to all district judges in Berks County directing the Courts to withhold work from Holt. Holt is awaiting charges of Theft by Unlawful Taking, Receiving Stolen Property, False Swearing, Tampering with Public Records, Unlawful Use of a Computer, and related offenses.
- Dennis J. Mulligan, Elected Constable from Reading – Mulligan was charged with submitting false bills for reimbursement for arresting and transporting people to court wanted on warrants. However, Berks County prosecutors alleged that those people paid their fines directly at District Court and did not even meet the constable.
- Hector Carrillo, Elected Constable from Reading – Carrillo was convicted of charging the county $203 after fraudulently reporting that he had transported people to court on May 6, 2008.
- Dane A. Spring, Elected Constable from Upper Tulpehocken Township, Berks County – Spring was convicted for trying to steal millions of dollars from an armored-car company's cash storage vault in Muhlenberg Township.
- Bradley A. Buchanan, Elected Constable from Birdsboro, Berks County – Buchanan was removed from performing constable duties after his arrest on charges he sexually assaulted a 15-year-old girl he met on Facebook.
- Steven Sokoloff, Appointed Deputy Constable from Lower Merion, Montgomery County – Prosecutors alleged that Sokoloff handcuffed the wrong man at an East Norriton car dealership and then refused to release the man after finding out that he had the wrong person. Sokoloff was stripped of his power by a Montgomery County judge, who signed an order removing Sokoloff from office as a deputy constable. In February 2009, Sokoloff filed to run for constable in Lower Merion Township, Montgomery County. The District Attorney, Risa Vetri Ferman, filed a petition for contempt of court against Sokoloff because Sokoloff agreed to never run for constable in Montgomery County, Pennsylvania again.
- Michael M. Solow, Elected Constable from West Conshohocken, Montgomery County – Prosecutors alleged that Solow evicted a person from their own home without ever having a court hearing. Prosecutors also alleged that Solow searched another woman's house without ever having a search warrant. According to the Associated Press, Solow had a history of abusing his power. This included a high-speed chase through Lower Merion and Philadelphia after police discontinued the chase for safety reasons. Solow reportedly caused damage to several cars and property during the chase. Solow was removed by Montgomery County Court of Common Pleas Judge Paul W. Tressler on December 31, 2008, for misfeasance, malfeasance, and acts of oppression.
- Jack Garner, Elected Constable from South Hanover Township – Jack Garner was convicted of official oppression and impersonating a police officer after confronting female motorists in two traffic and littering incidents in Lower Paxton Township. Garner was sentenced to four months of work release confinement and 10 years of probation.
- Brian Frankhouser, Elected Constable from Mifflin County, was sentenced to 10 days to a year in jail over charges in connection with two separate incidents: charges of retaliation against a prosecutor, terroristic threats, aiding in an escape, and interfering with the custody of an inmate.
- George Galovich, a constable from Butler County, was sentenced to 90 days of house arrest after being convicted of theft by unlawful taking; he had kept $4,000 in fines he had collected instead of turning them over to a county judge.
- Steven Wiggs was removed as constable after Lehigh County courts found he was not living at the Allentown address he claimed when seeking office, instead living in Newark, NJ.
- David R. Kneller, Elected Constable from Carbon County – Kneller was suspended from performing judicial duties on July 10, 2017. The Carbon County Court of Common Pleas ordered that “effective immediately and continuing until further order of this Court, Constable David R. Kneller... is suspended from performing any judicial duties in the 56th Judicial District... No Magisterial District Court within this district shall assign any duties to Constable Kneller... and shall recall all warrants or other judicial process previously issued to him.”

=== Proposed reform ===
On December 30, 2008, Ronald Castille, the Chief Justice of the Pennsylvania Supreme Court told the Associated Press that the Court was studying implementing statewide regulations, including issuing a statewide constable handbook. Castille further stated that the Supreme Court's minor rules committee was studying the Berks and Chester County Constable Handbook and would welcome input from judges across the Commonwealth in making a determination.

State Representative Tom Caltagirone, the former chairman of the Pennsylvania House Judiciary Committee, was working on possible reforms to the constable system. According to the Associated Press, Caltagirone met with the Pennsylvania State Constable Association and the Pennsylvania Fraternal Order of Constables to outline his reform proposal. However, no successful proposal was ever introduced.

Castille ordered a study of the constabulary to get a better reign on the situation in the state. The result was the 2014 Joint State Government Committee Constable Study. In addition to providing a history of the constabulary and comparisons to other law enforcement entities, the 100-plus page review cited issues with the constabulary and offered ideas to fix them, including modification of Act 49 of 2009. The JSGC study was never acted upon during 2014 or 2015.

In 2014, the PA Supreme Court implemented new Constable Rules of Court applicable to all constables. However, lacking a mechanism of enforcement and penalties for failure to follow, many counties and constables alike have chosen to ignore them. Some of the rules required constables to be uniformed when providing services, installing safety barriers in transport vehicles, among others.

== See also ==
- List of Pennsylvania state agencies
