= Constable (Texas) =

Law enforcement officer in Texas, United States

In the U.S. state of Texas, a constable is an elected law enforcement officer for a precinct of a county. Counties may have between one and eight precincts each depending on their population.

The constables are provided for in the Texas Constitution of 1876 (Article 5, Section 18). The term of office for Texas constables is four years. However, when vacancies arise, the commissioner's court of the respective county has the authority to appoint a replacement to serve out the remaining term. If no person is elected and qualified under law to fill an office of constable for seven consecutive years, the respective commissioner's court may declare the office dormant and it may not be filled by election or appointment. However, the commissioner's court may reinstate the office by a majority vote or by calling an election where a majority of precinct voters approve it.

== Authority ==
In Texas, constables and their deputies are fully empowered peace officers with county-wide jurisdiction and thus, may legally exercise their authority in any precinct within their county as stated in the Code of Criminal Procedures Sec 2.12. However, some constables’ offices limit themselves to providing law enforcement services only to their respective precinct, except in the case of serving civil and criminal process. Constables and their deputies may serve civil process in any precinct in their county and any contiguous county and can serve arrest warrants anywhere in the state. The duties of a Texas constable generally include providing bailiffs for the justice of the peace court(s) within his precinct and serving process issued there and from any other court. Moreover, some constables’ offices limit themselves to only these activities but others provide patrol, investigative, and security services as well. The constable's authority considerably overlaps with that of the county sheriff, especially with respect to serving civil documents as well as criminal warrants.

On April 13, 2018, the Texas Supreme Court held that deputy constables fall within the definition of "police officers" and are, as such, entitled to engage in collective bargaining with their public employers under Local Government Code chapter 174.

Additionally, the Texas Commission on Law Enforcement (TCOLE) the regulatory agency for all peace officers in Texas (sheriffs, constables, security police, police officers and marshals) and the Bureau of Justice Statistics of the Department of Justice considers the Texas constable to be a unique peace officer position.

== Strength ==
In 2000, there were 2,630 full-time deputies and 418 reserve deputies working for the 760 constables’ offices in Texas. Of this number, 35% were primarily assigned to patrol, 33% to serving process, 12% to court security, and 7% to criminal investigations. The Harris County Precinct 4 and 5 Constables’ Offices are the largest constables’ offices in Texas with over 500 deputies each. Combined, the eight precincts in Harris County employ nearly 1,800 deputy constables.

In the Census of State and Local Law Enforcement Agencies, 2000, which was published by the US DOJ's Bureau of Justice Statistics, it was noted that there were 2,630 full-time, sworn constables/deputy constables in Texas. Recent figures cite the number to around 3,500 and these include clerical and other personnel. Of this number, 35% of constables/deputy constables were primarily assigned to patrol duties. For example, in Harris County Precinct 4 and 5 (Greater Houston area), there are over 1400 patrol deputies. Additionally, 15% handled criminal investigations, i.e. they are detectives and investigators.

== New constable qualifications ==
Constable qualifications as changed by HB 1588 of the 79th Regular Session of the Texas Legislature:

Local Government Code 86.0021 (Qualifications; Removal)

- (a) A person is not eligible to serve as constable unless:
  - (1) the person is eligible to be licensed under Sections 1701.309 and 1701.312, Occupations Code, and:
    - (A) has at least an associate degree conferred by an institution of higher education accredited by an accrediting organization recognized by the Texas Higher Education Coordinating Board;
    - (B) is a special investigator under Article 2.122(a), Code of Criminal Procedure; or
    - (C) is an honorably retired peace officer or honorably retired federal criminal investigator who holds a certificate of proficiency issued under Section 1701.357, Occupations Code; or
  - (2) the person is an active or inactive licensed peace officer under Chapter 1701, Occupations Code.
- (b) On or before the 270th day after the date a constable takes office, the constable shall provide, to the commissioners court of the county in which the constable serves, evidence that the constable has been issued a permanent peace officer license under Chapter 1701, Occupations Code. A constable who fails to provide evidence of licensure under this subsection or who fails to maintain a permanent license while serving in office forfeits the office and is subject to removal in a quo warranto proceeding under Chapter 66, Civil Practice and Remedies Code.
- (c) The license requirement of Subsection (b) supersedes the license requirement of Section 1701.302, Occupations Code.

Grounds for removal include the failure to present permanent peace officer license on or before the 270th day after taking office. He can also be removed if he was convicted of a felony crime and a misdemeanor charge of official misconduct, in addition to incompetence and intoxication.

Finally, constables and their deputies in Texas are official, certified Texas law-enforcement officers. Constables and their deputies must graduate from a state-certified law enforcement academy. All peace officers in Texas are trained to the same state requirement. Constables also have identical powers of arrest as county sheriffs and their deputies.

== History ==
On March 5, 1823, John Tumlinson Sr., the first alcalde of the Colorado district of the Old 300 of Stephen Fuller Austin's colony, is considered by many Texas Ranger historians to be the first Texas Ranger killed in the line of duty. He wrote to the Baron de Bastrop in San Antonio that he had "appointed but one officer who acts in the capacity of constable to summon witnesses and bring offenders to justice." That appointee, Thomas V. Alley, thus became the first Anglo law enforcement officer in the future republic and state of Texas. Other prominent colonists who served as constable included John Austin and James Strange.

The Constitution of the Republic of Texas (1836) provided for the election in each county of a sheriff and "a sufficient number of constables." During the ten years of the republic's existence, thirty-eight constables were elected in twelve counties, the first in Nacogdoches County and the largest number (thirteen) in Harrisburg (later Harris) County. Court records indicate that violent crime was rare in the republic, except when horse or cattle thieves entered Texas from Arkansas or Louisiana; most indictments were for nonlethal crimes such as illegal gambling or assaults resulting from fights or scuffles. Juan N. Seguín and Elliott M. Millican both served as constables during the republic.

Shortly after Texas became a state, an act passed by the legislature specified that the constable should be "the conservator of the peace throughout the county," adding that "it shall be his duty to suppress all riots, routs, affrays, fighting, and unlawful assemblies, and he shall keep the peace, and shall cause all offenders to be arrested, and taken before some justice of the peace." Constables were the most active law-enforcement officials in many counties during the early statehood of Texas.

After Texas seceded from the United States in 1861, many county offices, including that of constable, remained unfilled or were filled by men less competent than their predecessors. During the military occupation of Texas after the Civil War, the election of county officials all but ceased, as the Union military appointed more than 200 individuals to state and county offices. A number of these appointees refused to serve; from 1865 to 1869, over one-third of the county offices in Texas were vacant. Many counties had no appointed or elected constables during this period. Austin, DeWitt, Fayette, McLennan, and Navarro counties had but a single constable each, appointed by Gen. Edward R. S. Canby, head of the Fifth Military District, in 1868–69.

Under the Constitution of 1869, a Reconstruction document that centralized many governmental functions, no constables were elected in Texas from 1869 to 1872, though some were appointed by justices of the peace. Many of these appointees lacked experience in handling violent offenders and access to secure jail facilities, and had few deputies to call upon for assistance. They were no match for the poor, embittered, and heavily armed former soldiers from both sides who roamed the state, often turning to crime. As a result, the office of constable began to diminish in importance, and the better-equipped county sheriffs began to assume a leading role in law enforcement. Still, a number of prominent Texas peace officers of the late nineteenth and twentieth centuries began their careers as constables or deputy constables, including Thomas R. Hickman, George A. Scarborough, and Jess Sweeten. In 1896, while serving as a United States deputy marshal, Scarborough shot and killed the controversial El Paso constable John Selman, who had himself gunned down the notorious John Wesley Hardin in 1895.

The Constitution of 1876, designed to decentralize control of the state government, reduced the power of many state officials and mandated that constables would once again be elected at the precinct level. A 1954 constitutional amendment extended their term of office from two years to four. Today, constables numbering approximately 780 are elected from precincts in most Texas counties. Their law-enforcement roles vary widely, but in general their police powers are no different from those of other peace officers in the state. Complete records do not exist, but the most recent estimate is that at least ninety-three Texas constables have died in the line of duty, including sixty-seven in the twentieth century.

In some Texas counties, the constable position remains unfilled for several years and this is attributed to several factors such as the refusal of people appointed to the job. In 2002, an amendment to the Texas Constitution was approved since this was the only way to abolish these seats. The change allows a commissioners' court to abolish a constable office that has been vacant for seven years. The court can also restore it or by voter approval.

== Constable's jurisdiction ==
The constable's original jurisdiction covers the county of election but also the entire state in most criminal and civil matters. Constables may make a warrantless arrest for any offense committed in their presence or view anywhere in Texas, except for offenses under Texas Transportation Code, Title 7, Subtitle C, which covers most moving traffic violations. However, they may enforce all state and local laws while in their county, including traffic offenses. Constables may serve arrest warrants anywhere in Texas.

There is a popular misconception in Texas that a constable is the only official that can arrest a sitting sheriff or governor. However, a constable is not the only official with the power to arrest a sheriff or governor. There is no statute that grants those officials immunity from arrest.

== Notes ==
1. Precinct boundaries are set by the County Commissioners Court. See Texas Local Government Code §81.021 and based on population. There are two to eight precincts per Texas county.
2. Constables (and the justice of the peace, and county commissioners) are elected by these precincts and they must provide bailiffs for the Justice Court(s) in their precinct.
3. They can also serve civil process in any precinct in their county and any contiguous county to their home county. See Texas Local Government Code §86.021.
4. Moreover, they can serve warrants throughout the state. See Texas Code of Criminal Procedure Article 15.06.
5. Furthermore, their jurisdiction to arrest, without warrant, extends throughout the county, where they have full arrest powers. See Texas Local Government Code §86.021 and Texas Attorney General's Opinion GA-0189.
6. They also have full arrest powers outside of their jurisdiction, while in the state, except for certain traffic violations. See Texas Code of Criminal Procedure Article 14.03(g).

== See also ==
- Constables in the United States
- Policing in the United States
- Sheriff
- Marshal
