= Fort Bliss =

US Army post in New Mexico and Texas, US

- Part of Army Forces Command (FORSCOM)
- El Paso County, Texas and Doña Ana / Otero counties, New Mexico, Southwestern United States
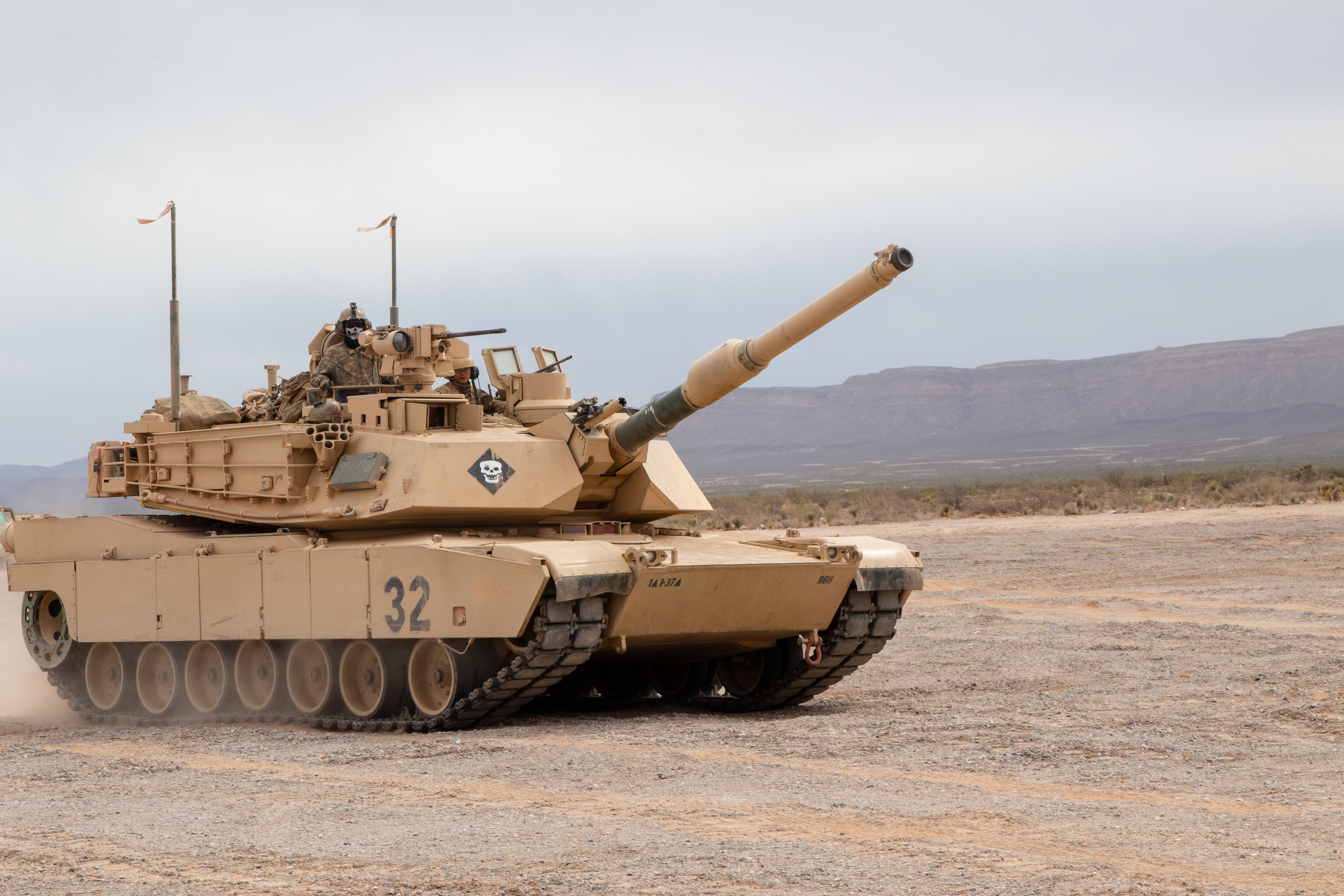
- A 1-37AR, 1st Armored Division Abrams tank crew on Fort Bliss' Orogrande Range Camp, 2019

Site information
- Type: Military base
- Controlled by: United States (1849–1861); Confederate States of America (1861–1862); United States (1862–present)
- Facilities: Biggs Army Airfield; McGregor Range; Doña Ana Range; North Training Area; South Training Area

Location
- Location of Fort Bliss Fort Bliss (the United States)
- Coordinates: 31°48′07″N 106°25′29″W

Site history
- Built: 1849–1893 (Note: A total of five areas have housed the military post from its original creation to the present; this time frame takes into account the construction for each.)
- In use: 1849–present (Note: Fort Bliss was abandoned twice before it became a permanent facility; this time frame does not take into account the years when the post was not in service.)

Garrison information
- Current commander: Major general Curtis D. Taylor
- Past commanders: John J. Pershing
- Garrison: 1st Armored Division 15th Sustainment Brigade; 402nd Field Artillery Brigade; 5th Armored Brigade; 32nd Army Air and Missile Defense Command; 11th Air Defense Artillery Brigade; 86th Expeditionary Signal Battalion; Joint Task Force North German Air Force Command USA/CAN German Air Force Air Defense Center
- Occupants: DCG: Maneuver: Brigadier (UK) Richard Bell; Operations: BG Michael J. Simmering; Support: COL Alric L. Francis

Fort Bliss is a United States Army post in New Mexico and Texas, with its headquarters in El Paso, Texas. Established in 1848, the fort was renamed in 1854 to honor Bvt.Lieut.Colonel William W.S. Bliss. It is the largest installation in the United States Army Forces Command (FORSCOM) and second-largest in the Army overall, the largest being the adjacent White Sands Missile Range. Fort Bliss provides the largest contiguous tract (1,500 sq mi or 3,900 km^{2}) of restricted airspace in the continental United States, used for missile and artillery training and testing, and at 992,000 acres (401,000 ha) has the largest maneuver area, ahead of the National Training Center, which has 642,000 acres (260,000 ha). In August 2025, Immigration and Customs Enforcement (ICE) opened a detention facility named Camp East Montana with a capacity of 1,000, eventually 5,000, detainees on Fort Bliss.

== Geography ==
Fort Bliss is located in El Paso County, Texas, and Doña Ana / Otero counties, New Mexico in the Southwestern United States. It has an area of about 1,700 square miles (4,400 km^{2}). The garrison's land area is 1.12 million acres (0.45×10^{6} ha), ranging to the boundaries of the Lincoln National Forest and White Sands Missile Range in New Mexico. Fort Bliss includes the Castner Range National Monument. The portion of the post located in El Paso County, is a census-designated place with a population of 8,591 in the 2010 census.

== Units ==
Fort Bliss is home to the 1st Armored Division, which returned to US soil in 2011 after 40 years in Germany. The division is supported by the 1st Armored Division Sustainment Brigade. The installation is home to Joint Task Force North, a joint service command. JTF North supports federal law enforcement agencies in the conduct of counterdrug/counter transnational organized crime operations. It facilitates DoD training in the United States Northern Command area of responsibility to disrupt transnational criminal organizations and deter their freedom of action to protect the homeland and increase DoD unit readiness.

The 32nd Army Air and Missile Defense Command is a theater-level Army air and missile defense multicomponent organization with a worldwide, 72-hour deployment mission. It is the Army Forces Command and Joint Force Land Component Commanders' organization that performs critical theater air- and missile-defense planning, integration, coordination, and execution functions.

The Joint Modernization Command (JMC) plans, prepares, and executes Joint Warfighting Assessments and other concept and capability assessments, provides objective analysis and feasible recommendations to enhance Multi Domain Command and Control, and informs Army Modernization decisions. On order, JMC conducts directed assessments in support of the Cross Functional Teams of Army Futures Command.

== 1st Armored Division ==
The 1st Armored Division units include: 1st Brigade Combat Team, 1st Armored Division ("Ready First") is prepared to deploy, conduct decisive and sustainable land operations in support of a division, Joint Task Force, or Multinational Force. The Brigade will be trained and ready to conduct decisive action as part of Combined Arms Maneuver or Wide Area Security operations in order to disrupt or destroy enemy military forces, control land, and be prepared to conduct combat operations to protect U.S. national interests.

2nd Brigade Combat Team, 1st Armored Division ("Strike") is prepared to deploy, conduct decisive and sustainable land operations in support of a division, Joint Task Force, or Multinational Force. The Brigade will be trained and ready to conduct decisive action as part of Combined Arms Maneuver or Wide Area Security operations in order to disrupt or destroy enemy military forces, control land, and be prepared to conduct combat operations to protect U.S. national interests.

3rd Brigade Combat Team, 1st Armored Division ("Bulldog") is prepared to deploy, conduct decisive and sustainable land operations in support of a division, Joint Task Force, or Multinational Force. The Brigade will be trained and ready to conduct decisive action as part of Combined Arms Maneuver or Wide Area Security operations in order to disrupt or destroy enemy military forces, control land, and be prepared to conduct combat operations to protect U.S. national interests.

1st Armored Division Combat Aviation Brigade ("Iron Eagles") conducts aviation operations to support geographic combatant commanders conducting unified land operations.

1st Armored Division (1AD) Artillery (DIVARTY) ("Iron Steel") provides direct support, precision strike, and Joint Fires capability to the 1st Armored Division for Unified Land Operations in support of the Division's contingency operations. 1AD DIVARTY provides trained and ready fire support forces and assists Brigade Combat Team (BCT) Commanders in training their fire support systems.

1st Armored Division Sustainment ("Muleskinners") provides mission command of assigned, attached, and Operational Control (OPCON) Echelons above Brigade sustainment units and synchronize distribution and sustainment operations in support of 1st Armored Division, and other aligned units. On order, rapidly deploy to designated contingency areas; receive, integrate, and provide mission command of sustainment units providing operational and tactical sustainment; and perform theater opening, theater distribution, and sustainment operations in support of Unified Land Operations.

== Additional units/agencies ==
The Non-Commissioned Officer (NCO) Leadership Center of Excellence (NCOL CoE): Academic institution for noncommissioned officers aligned under Army University and the Combined Arms Command, with additional reporting to Training and Doctrine Command. Provides professional military education to DoD and allied noncommissioned officers.

The United States Army Sergeants Major Academy (USASMA) was accredited as a branch campus of the Command and General Staff College (CGSC) in 2018. In March 2018, the CGSC Combined Arms Center Execution Order, made USASMA the 4th campus of CGSC. In June 2019, USASMA Class 69 became the first students from the Sergeants Major Course to earn Bachelors of Arts in Leadership and Workforce Development (Staff College) through USASMA. The accreditation process took 10 years, beginning with the last officer commandant, Col. Donald E. Gentry.

The 11th Air Defense Artillery Brigade: Known as the "Imperial" Brigade, it strategically deploys combat ready units globally in support of the 32nd AAMDC to conduct joint and combined air and missile defense operations in order to protect the Combatant Commander's critical priorities. On order, conducts reset and training of Patriot, Avenger Iron Dome, and Terminal High Altitude Area Defense (THAAD) units.

William Beaumont Army Medical Center (WBAMC)

The 5th Armored Brigade: The brigade plans, coordinates, synchronizes, and supports the pre/post mobilization training and demobilization of Army National Guard and United States Army Reserve units in order to provide trained and ready forces for worldwide contingencies. On order, deploys exportable OC/T teams in support of the Army Total Force Policy.

The Fort Bliss Mobilization Brigade: The brigade provides all administrative and logistical aspects of Title 10 support to mobilizing/demobilizing units. Act as focal point for installation support and quality of life issues. Coordinate requirements and integrate mobilization support. Provides personnel and logistical readiness validation input.

The CONUS Replacement Center: CRC receives, processes, equips, and conducts Theater Specific Individual Requirements Training (TSIRT) for military Non Unit Related Personnel (NRP), Department of Defense (DoD) Civilians, and Non Logistics Civil Augmentation (LOGCAP) Program (Non LOGCAP) Contactors deploying to and redeploying from theaters of operations in support of overseas contingency operations.

The Army Field Support Battalion (AFSBn): AFSBn is responsible for enhancing the readiness of Active, Reserve and National Guard units and continuously synchronizing the distribution of sustainment materiel and force projection at the Installation and field level in order to support the Materiel Enterprise and combat readiness of supported units and contingency operations.

The Network Enterprise Command: This unit defends the security of the Army Global Network Construct, provides transparent delivery of Command, Control, Communications and Computer (C4) Information Technology (IT services to customers).

The Civilian Personnel Advisory Center (CPAC) -- Desert Mountain: CPAC is responsible for assisting customers in recruiting, developing and sustaining a professional civilian workforce through human resource products and advisory services.

The headquarters for the El Paso Intelligence Center (EPIC), a federal tactical operational intelligence center, is hosted at Fort Bliss. Its DoD (United States Department of Defense) counterpart, Joint Task Force North, is at Biggs Army Airfield. Biggs Field, a military airport located at Fort Bliss, is designated a military power projection platform. (Note: Fort Bliss is currently the largest mobilization/ demobilization center in the Army, according to the Fort Bliss commanding general Major General Dana J.H. Pittard's weekly column, Fort Bliss Monitor June 13, 2012) (Note: The Central Issue Facility, which is part of the Directorate of Mobilization and Deployment in Fort Bliss, serves to provision all servicemembers who process through this Joint Mobilization Site, whether they be Navy, Air Force, Army, Army Reserve, or National Guard. A unit passing through this joint mobilization site is further provisioned with equipment by the Rapid Fielding Initiative in the Directorate of Mobilization and Deployment, during their pre-mobilization; if the unit returns through this joint mobilization site after their deployment, the Directorate of Mobilization and Deployment re-acquires responsibility for the equipment for which the servicemembers have signed.)

Fort Bliss National Cemetery is located on the post. Other forts in the frontier fort system were Forts Griffin, Concho, Belknap, Chadbourne, Stockton, Davis, Richardson, McKavett, Clark, McIntosh, Inge, and Phantom Hill in Texas, and Fort Sill in Oklahoma. There were "sub posts or intermediate stations" including Bothwick's Station on Salt Creek between Fort Richardson and Fort Belknap, Camp Wichita near Buffalo Springs between Fort Richardson and Red River Station, and Mountain Pass between Fort Concho and Fort Griffin.

== Infrastructure ==
- DoD's second largest installation at 1.12M acres. Abuts the largest, White Sands Missile Range
- Maneuver acreage, heavy and light: 924,640.2 acres
- The only Digital Air Ground Integration Range (DAGIR) built to full Army specifications
- The longest runway in the Army, 8th longest in the DoD
- A major trauma center. plus the new William Beaumont Army Medical Center
- One of the largest single solar residential communities in the continental US, at 4K+ homes, with potential to expand
- Total building gross square footage (GSF), minus housing: 24,499,406 square feet, with 2,139 buildings

== History ==
=== Early locations ===
==== Post opposite El Paso del Norte (1849–1854) ====
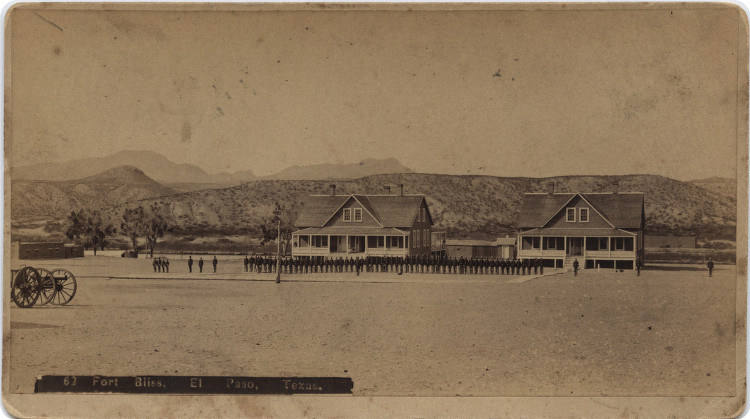
Fort Bliss in 1885. Photo courtesy of SMU.

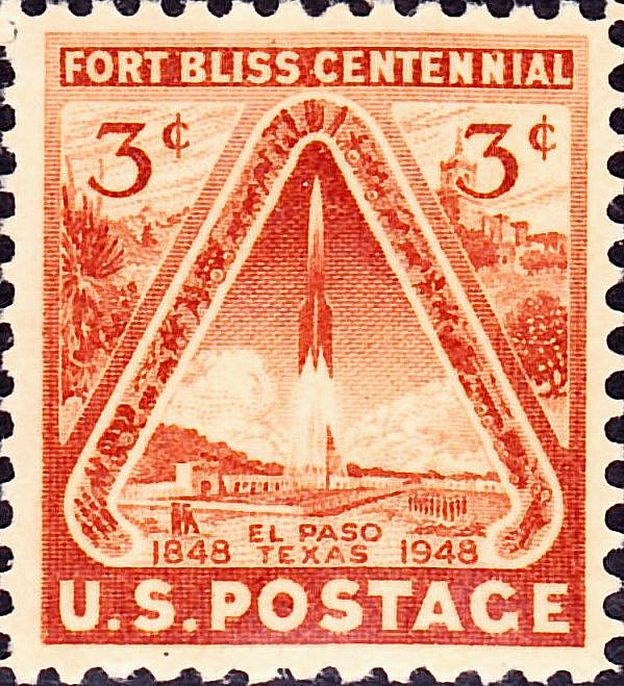
Fort Bliss 100th Anniversary Issue of 1948

In 1846, Colonel Alexander Doniphan led 1st Regiment of Missouri mounted volunteers through El Paso del Norte, with victories at the Battle of El Brazito and the Battle of the Sacramento. On 7 November 1848, War Department General Order no. 58 ordered the establishment of a post across from El Paso del Norte, now Ciudad Juárez. On 8 September 1849, the garrison party of several companies of the 3rd U.S. Infantry, 'The Old Guard', currently the oldest active duty regiment in the US Army, commanded by Major Jefferson Van Horne, found only four small and scattered settlements on the north side of the Rio Grande.

The Post Opposite El Paso del Norte was first established at the site of Coon's Ranch, often erroneously referred to as Smith's Ranch, now downtown El Paso It, along with Fort Selden and other Southwestern outposts, protected recently won territory from harassing Apaches and Comanches, provided local law and order, and escorted the forty-niners. Van Horne also had nominal command of the Post at San Elizario, the former Presidio of San Elizario, seventeen miles downstream from El Paso del Norte. With constant Indian raids, garrisons had to be moved frequently to meet the shifting threats. In September 1851, the Post Opposite El Paso and the Post at San Elizario were closed, and the soldiers were moved 40 miles (64 km) north to Fort Fillmore.

==== Post of El Paso (1854), Fort Bliss, (1854–1868) ====
On 11 January 1854, Companies B, E, I and K of the 8th Infantry, under the command of Lt. Col. Edmund B. Alexander, established Post of El Paso at Magoffinsville under orders from Secretary of War Jefferson Davis. The post was named 'Fort Bliss' on 8 March 1854, in honor of Lt. Col. William Wallace Smith Bliss, (1815–1853), U.S. Army officer, private secretary, and son-in-law of President Zachary Taylor. Bliss was a veteran of the Mexican War (1846–1848) who was cited for gallantry in action.

Fort Bliss remained there for the next 14 years, serving as a base for troops guarding the area against Apache attacks. Until 1861 most of these troops were units of the 8th Infantry Regiment. At the outbreak of the American Civil War, David E. Twiggs, the Commander of the Department of Texas, ordered the garrison to surrender Fort Bliss to the Confederacy, which Col. Isaac Van Duzen Reeve did on 31 March 1861. Companies B, E, F, H, I, and K were captured by the Confederacy and remained prisoners of war until 25 February 1863 in Texas. Company A returned safely to the North with their Colors on 26 May 1861.

Confederate forces consisting of the 2nd Regiment of Texas, under the command of Col. John R. Baylor, took the post on 1 July 1861, and used it as a platform to launch attacks into New Mexico and Arizona in an effort to force the Union garrisons still in these states to surrender. Initially the Confederate Army had success in their attempts to gain control of New Mexico, but following the Battle of Glorieta Pass, the Confederate soldiers were forced to retreat when their supply lines were cut.

In 1862, the Confederate garrison abandoned Fort Bliss without a fight when a Federal column of 2,350 men under the command of Colonel James H. Carleton advanced from California. The Californians maintained an irregular garrison at Fort Bliss until 1865, when 5th Infantry units arrived to reestablish the post. These were relieved by the 25th Infantry, Buffalo Soldiers, on 12 August 1866, followed by the 35th Infantry two months later.

==== Camp Concordia (1868–1876) ====
After May 1867 Rio Grande flooding seriously damaged the Magoffinsville post, Fort Bliss was moved to a site called 'Camp Concordia' in March 1868. Camp Concordia's location was immediately south of what is now Interstate 10, across from Concordia Cemetery in El Paso. The Rio Grande was about a mile south of the camp at that time. Water was hauled daily by mule team to the camp. On 11 March 1869 the old name of Fort Bliss was resumed.

Water, heating, and sanitation facilities were at a minimum in the adobe buildings of the fort. Records reveal that troops suffered severely from dysentery and malaria and that supplies arrived irregularly over the Santa Fe Trail by wagon train. In January 1877, the Concordia post was abandoned. After the troops left, El Paso was without a garrison for more than a year. By that time, El Paso and its environs on the north side of the river had swelled to a population of almost 800.

==== Hart's Mill (1878–1893) ====
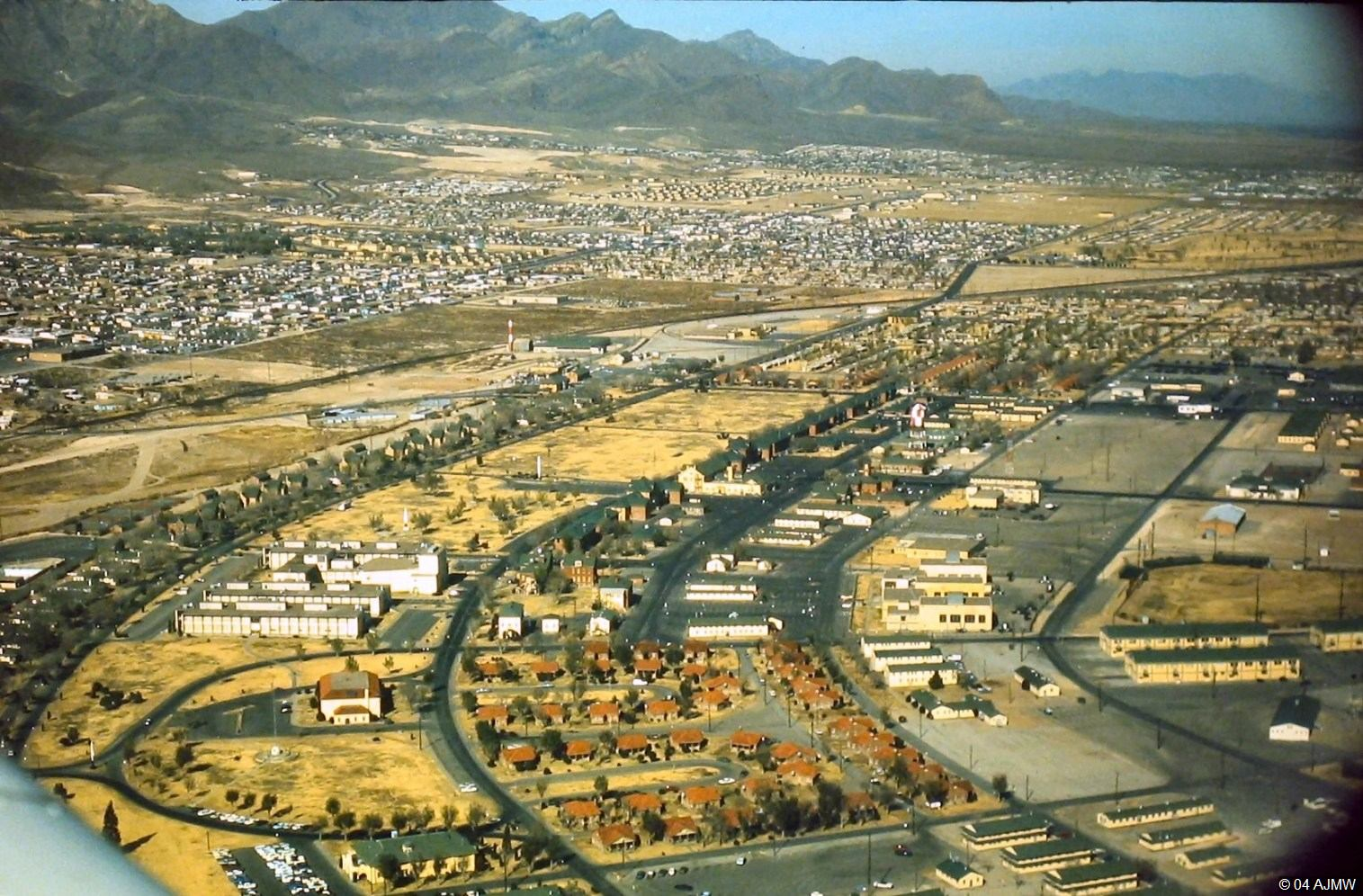
An aerial view of Fort Bliss, 1968, with Northeast El Paso in background

On New Year's Day 1878, Fort Bliss was established as a permanent post. The Company L Buffalo Soldiers of the Ninth Cavalry and Company C of the 15th Infantry, were sent to Fort Bliss to prevent further trouble over the salt beds and the usage of Rio Grande water for irrigation purposes. Prior to this date, the government had a policy of leasing property for its military installations. A tract of 135 acres (0.55 km^{2}) was purchased at Hart's Mill on the river's edge in the Pass, near what is today the UTEP.

With a $40,000 appropriation, a building program began. The first railroad arrived in 1881, and tracks were laid across the military reservation, solving the supply problems for the fort and the rapidly growing town of El Paso. By 1890, Hart's Mill had outlived its usefulness, and Congress appropriated $150,000 for construction of a military installation on the mesa approximately 5 miles (8.0 km) east of El Paso's 1890 city limits. Although no money was appropriated for the land, $8,250 was easily raised by the local residents, who realized the economic benefit to the area.

Ruhlen's 1893 buildings, currently offices still stand at Fort Bliss, as do the officers' quarters.

==== Present site (1893–today) ====
The present site of Fort Bliss on La Noria mesa, (Note: The arroyo below La Noria mesa, now occupied by the Patriot Freeway, was once the site of a large military display, 2 February 1920, which was held in honor of General John J. Pershing. The parade was witnessed by El Pasoans seated on the slopes of the mesa. All elements of Fort Bliss took part, including a parade of all 4500 troopers of the Eighth Cavalry, mounted 48 horses abreast.—Trish Long (Dec 2014), ") was laid out by Captain John Ruhlen from 1891 to 1892. In October 1893, it was occupied by four companies of the 18th Infantry.

=== Pershing expedition ===
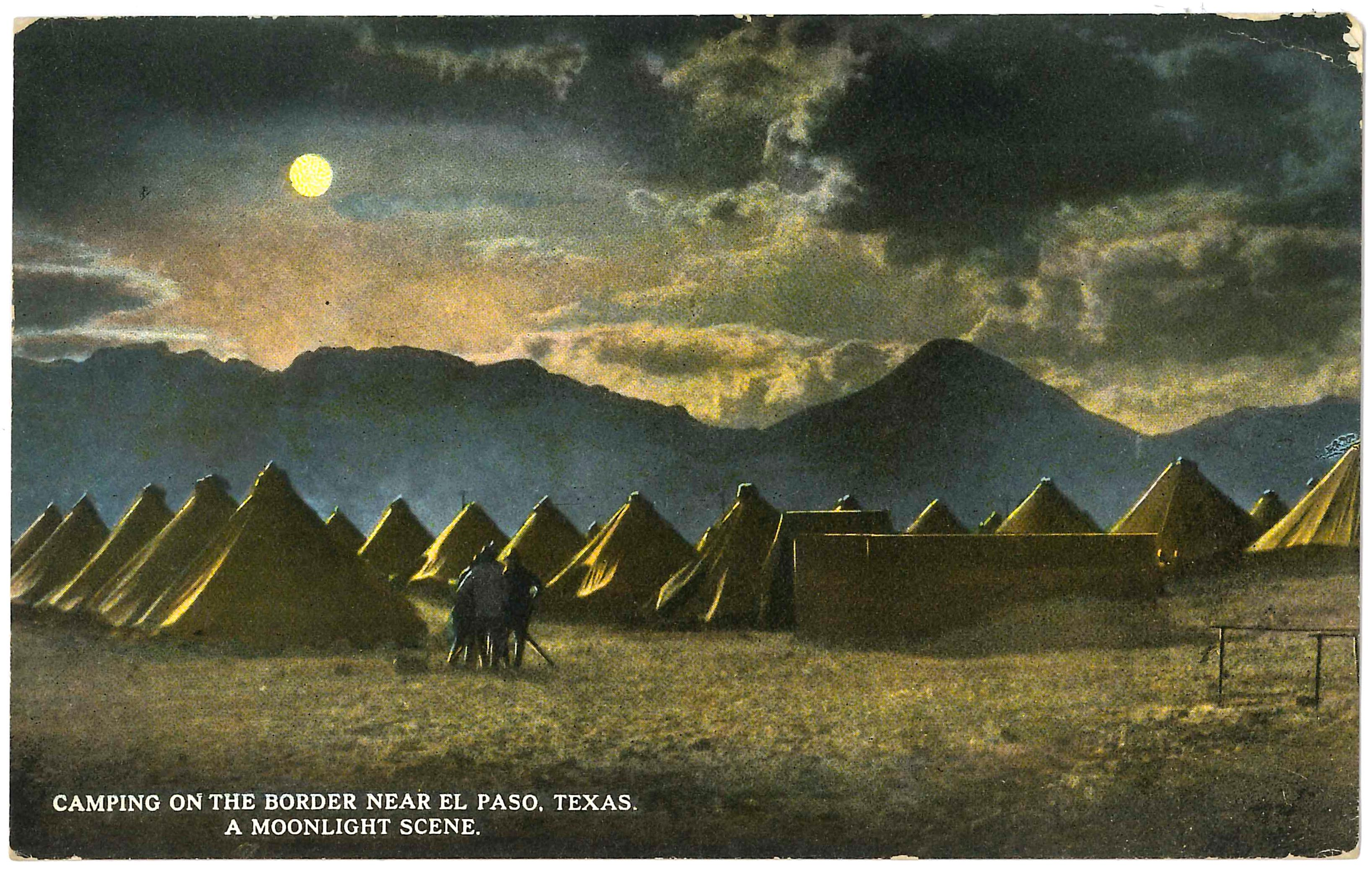
Pershing's camp at the western edge of the present-day Fort Bliss area, 1916

In January 1914, John J. Pershing arrived (Note: After a year at Fort Bliss, Pershing decided to arrange for his family to join him. The arrangements were almost complete when, on the morning of 27 August 1915, he received a telegram telling him of a fire in the Presidio of San Francisco. His wife and three young daughters had been burned to death; only his six-year-old son Warren had been saved. Many who knew Pershing said that he never recovered from the deaths of his wife and daughters. After the funerals at Lakeview Cemetery in Cheyenne, Wyoming, Pershing returned to Fort Bliss with his son, Warren, and his sister Mae, and resumed his duties as commanding officer.) in El Paso to take command of the Army 8th Brigade that was stationed at Fort Bliss. At the time, the Mexican Revolution was underway in Mexico, and the 8th Brigade had been assigned the task of securing the Mexico–United States border. In March 1915, under the command of General Frederick Funston, Pershing led the 8th Brigade on the failed 1916–1917 Punitive Expedition into Mexico in search of outlaw Pancho Villa. (Note: During the Pancho Villa Expedition, General Pershing was assigned a 1915 Dodge Brothers touring car, serial number 3066, and George S. Patton served as one of Pershing's aides. [This footnote should be moved to the Pancho Villa Expedition wikipage.])

On 11 March 2016, members of the 2nd Squadron, 13th Cavalry Regiment, (3rd BCT, 1st Armored Division, Fort Bliss) conducted a staff ride at Pancho Villa State Park, NM, the former site of Camp Furlong, 2nd Squadron's billet in 1915. They reviewed the terrain of the 9 March 1916 raid by Pancho Villa's forces on the unit 100 years before. The 2nd Squadron then participated in a parade with reenactors, and Roll Call of the fallen.

During this time, the military airfield in El Paso became one of the homes to the United States Army Border Air Patrol and the 1st Aero Squadron, the U.S. Army's first tactical unit equipped with airplanes.

=== World War I and postwar ===
As American Expeditionary Forces (AEF) commander (1917–1918), John J. Pershing transferred to Fort Bliss and was responsible for the organization, training, and supply of an inexperienced force that eventually grew from 27,000 men to over 2,000,000—the National Army of World War I.

From 10 December 1917 – 12 May 1918, the wartime 15th Cavalry Division existed at Fort Bliss. Similarly, the Headquarters, 2nd Cavalry Brigade was initially activated at Fort Bliss on 10 December 1917 and then deactivated in July 1919, and reactivated at Fort Bliss on 31 August 1920. Predominantly a cavalry post since 1912, Fort Bliss acquired three light armored cars, eight medium armored cars, two motorcycles, and two trucks in November 1928.

=== World War II and postwar ===
During World War II, Fort Bliss focused on training anti-aircraft artillery battalions (AAA). In September 1940, the Coast Artillery's anti-aircraft training center was established. In 1941, the 1st Tow Target Squadron arrived to fly target drones. The 6th, 19th, and 27th Tow Target Squadrons were at the nearby Biggs Field. On 3 August 1944, the Anti-Aircraft Artillery School was ordered from Camp Davis to Fort Bliss to make the training of anti-aircraft gunners easier, and they became the dominant force at Fort Bliss following the departure of the U.S. 1st Cavalry Division. On 15 September 1942, the War Dept. made space available for handling up to 1,350 POWs, while POW camps could be constructed. During the war, the base was used to hold approximately 91 German, Italian, and Japanese Americans from Hawaii (then a territory), who were arrested as potential fifth columnists but, in most cases, denied due process.

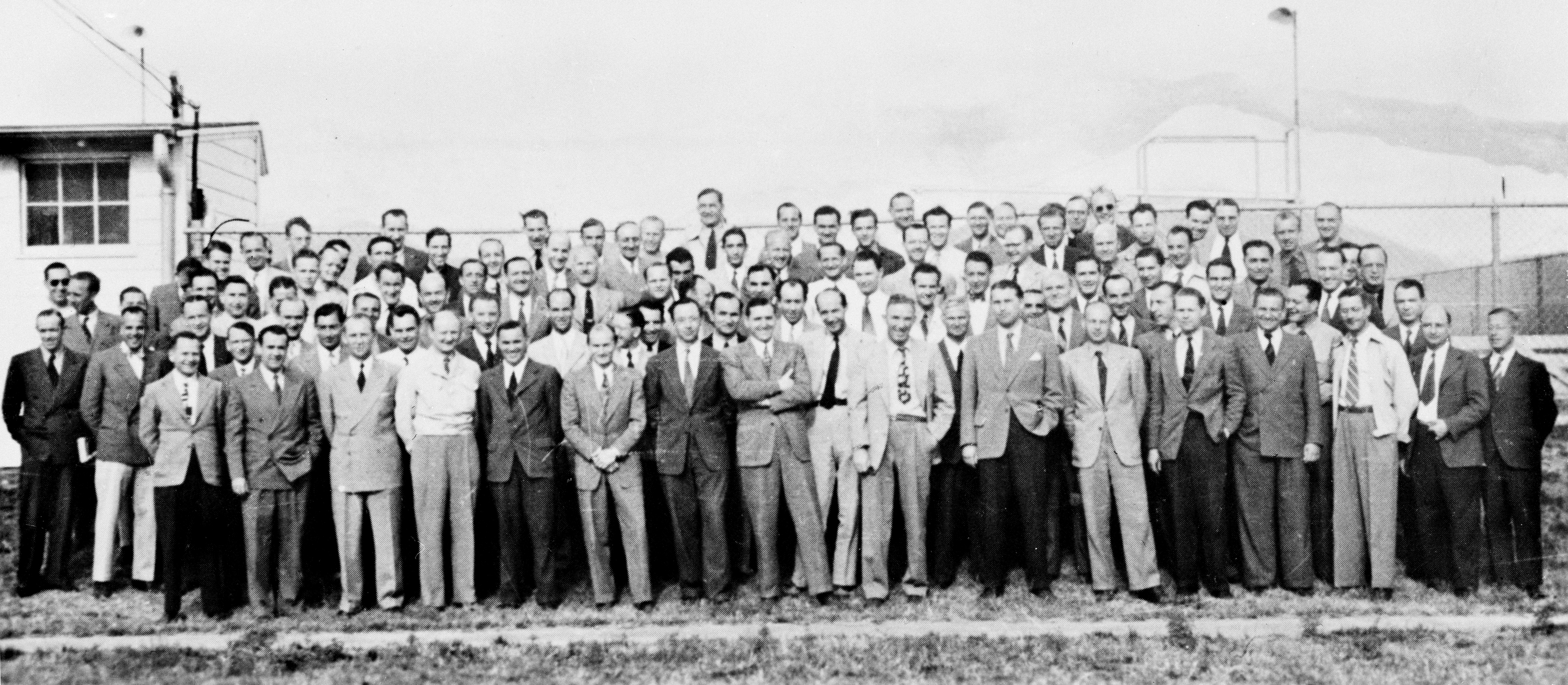
A group of 104 Operation Paperclip rocket scientists in 1946 at Fort Bliss. 35 were at the White Sands Proving Grounds.

By February 1946, over 100 Operation Paperclip German scientists and engineers had arrived to develop rockets, and were attached to the Office of the Chief of Ordnance Corps, Research and Development Service, Suboffice (Rocket), headed by Major James P. Hamill. Although these men were initially "pretty much kept on ice", resulting in the nickname "Operation Icebox", they were divided into a research group and a group who assisted with V-2 test launches at White Sands Proving Grounds.

German families began arriving in December 1946. By the spring of 1948, the number of German rocket specialists, nicknamed "Prisoners of Peace", in the US was 127. Fort Bliss rocket launches included firings of the Private missile at the Hueco Range in April 1945. In 1953, funding cuts caused the cancellation of work on the Hermes B2 ramjet work that had begun at Fort Bliss. (Note: On 3 September 1948, FBI informant PT-1 reported a Fort Bliss barber had been recruited to send missile photographs and information to the Soviet Embassy in Mexico City.^{p406})

In late 1953, after troops had been trained at the Ft Bliss Guided Missile School, field-firing operations of the MGM-5 Corporal were underway at Red Canyon Range Camp, WSPG. In April 1950, the 1st Guided Missile Group named the Republic-Ford JB-2 the Army Loon.

=== Cold War ===
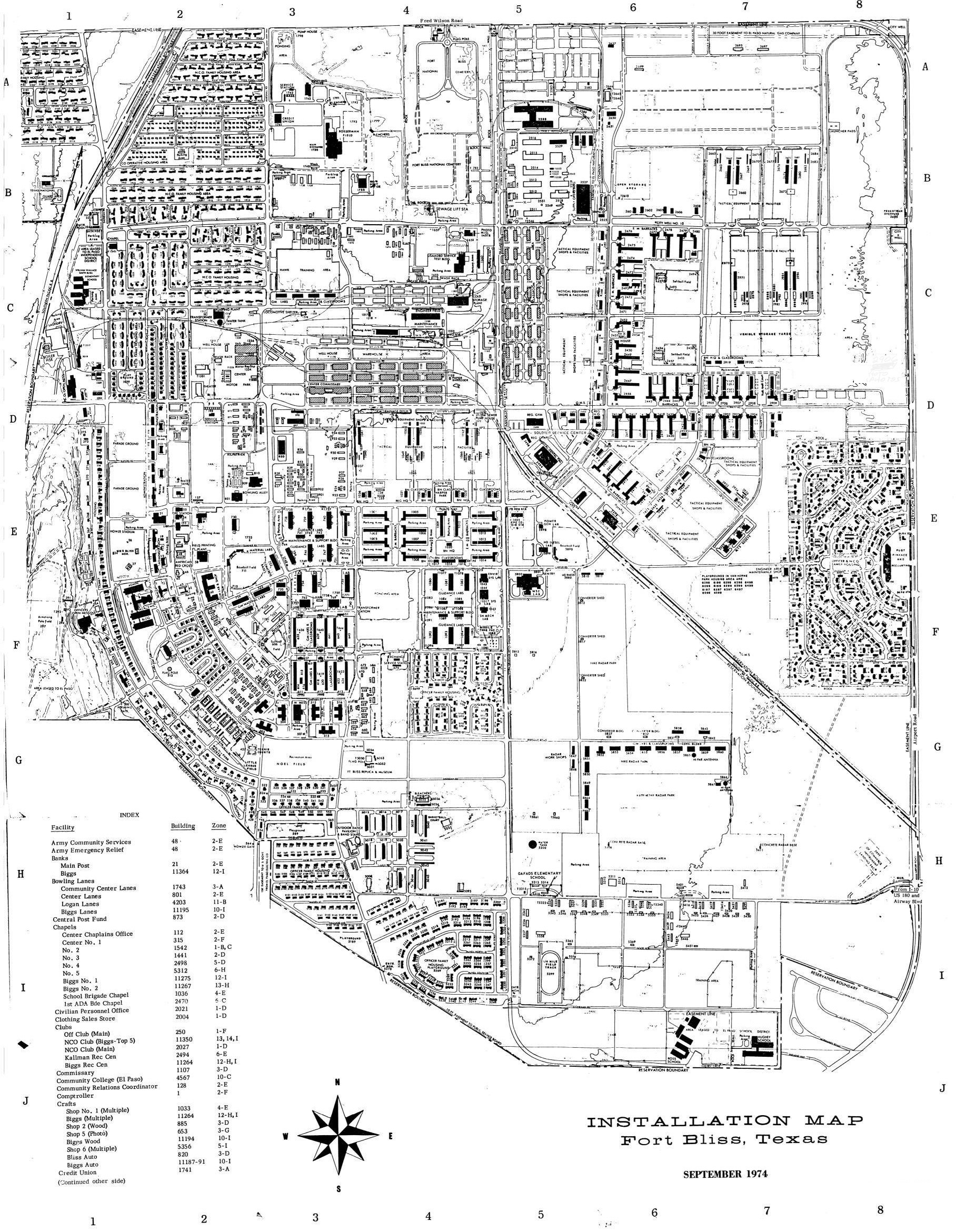
A map of the main Fort Bliss facility area, 1974

Fort Bliss trained thousands of U.S. Soldiers during the Cold War. As the United States gradually came to master the art of building and operating missiles, Fort Bliss and White Sands Missile Range became more important to the country, and were expanded accordingly. In July 1957, the U.S. Army Air Defense Center was established at Fort Bliss. Located at this center, in addition to Center Headquarters, are the U.S. Army Air Defense School; Air Defense; the 6th Artillery Group (Air Defense); the 61st Ordnance Group; and other supporting elements. (Note: During this time the 3rd Armored Cavalry Regiment was also assigned to Fort Bliss, and later relocated to Fort Carson, Colorado.) In 1957, Fort Bliss and its anti-aircraft personnel began using Nike Ajax, Nike Hercules, Hawk, Sprint, Chaparral, and Redeye missiles. (Note: Two other surface-to-surface missile systems—LaCrosse and Honest John— were based at Fort Sill, Oklahoma, but would frequently come to Fort Bliss for the purpose of conducting live fire exercises.) Fort Bliss took on the important role of providing a large area for troops to conduct live fire exercises with the missiles.

Because of the large number of Army personnel enrolled in the air defense school, Fort Bliss saw two large rounds of construction in 1954 and 1958. The 1954 build was aimed at creating more barracks facilities. Construction in 1958 built new classrooms, materials labs, a radar park, and a missile laboratory. Between 1953 and 1957, the Army expanded McGregor Range in an effort to accommodate live fire exercises of the new missile systems. Throughout the Cold War, Fort Bliss remained a premier site for testing anti-aircraft equipment.

Fort Bliss was used as the Desert Stage of the Ranger School training course, to prepare Ranger School graduates for operations in the deserts of the Middle East. From 1983 to 1987, Fort Bliss was home to the Ranger School's newly formed 4th (Desert Ranger) Training Company. In 1987, this unit was expanded to form the newly created Ranger Training Brigade's short-lived 7th Ranger Training Battalion, which was then transferred to the Dugway Proving Grounds in Utah. The deserts of Utah proved to be unsuitable, so the 7th Ranger Training Battalion was returned to Fort Bliss from 1991 until the Ranger School's Desert Phase was discontinued in 1995.

While the United States Army Air Defense Artillery School develops doctrine and tactics, training current and future soldiers has always been Fort Bliss' core mission. Until 1990, Fort Bliss was used for Basic Training and Advanced Individual Training (AIT), under the 1/56 ADA Regiment and the 2/56 ADA Regiment, part of the 6th ADA. Before 1989, 1/56 had three basic training companies and two AIT batteries. After 1990, 1/56 dropped basic training, that mission assumed by Fort Sill. The unit now had four enlisted batteries for enlisted AIT, one battery for the Officer's Basic Course and Captain's Career Course, added in 2004, and one company that trained army truck drivers in MOS 88M.

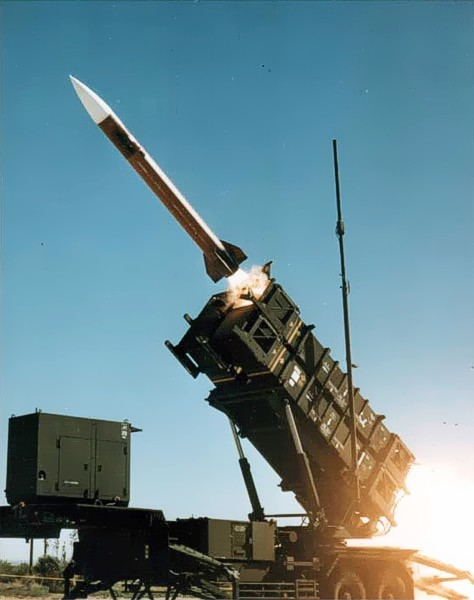
A U.S. Patriot Missile fires from its launch canister.

=== Base realignment and closure ===
In 1995, the Department of Defense recommended that the U.S. 3rd Armored Cavalry Regiment be relocated to Fort Carson, Colorado. Efforts to consolidate units from another post with those units that remained at Fort Bliss were overruled by the Base Realignment and Closing Commission, leaving Fort Bliss without any armored vehicles. Units operating the US Army's MIM-104 Patriot Missile Defense System relocated to Fort Bliss during the 1990s. The Patriot system played an important role in the Persian Gulf War/Operation Desert Storm in 1991. In commemoration, the US 54 expressway in northeast El Paso was designated the Patriot Freeway.

=== War on terror ===
After the September 11, 2001 attacks, Fort Bliss provided ADA Battalions for US and NATO use in Afghanistan and Iraq, and has served as one of the major deployment centers for troops bound for Iraq and Afghanistan. This mission is accomplished via nearby Biggs Army Airfield, which is included in the installation's supporting areas. Following the War in Afghanistan (2001–2021) in 2001 Fort Bliss began training Afghan security forces at the U.S. Army Sergeants Major Academy at Fort Bliss, with the hope that these newly trained soldiers would eventually be able to take control of their own national security.

=== Base Realignment and Closure, 2005 ===
In 2005, the Pentagon recommended transforming Fort Bliss into a heavy armor training post, to include approximately 11,500 new troops from the U.S. 1st Armored Division – at that time stationed in Germany – as well as units from Fort Sill and Fort Hood. An estimated 15,918 military jobs and 384 civilian jobs were planned to be transferred to Fort Bliss, brought the total number of troops stationed at Fort Bliss under this alignment to 33,500 by 2012. Officials from Fort Bliss and the City of El Paso were thrilled with the decision. The general mood of the city government was perfectly captured by 14 May edition of the El Paso Times, which boldly proclaimed "BLISS WINS BIG".

According to Senator Eliot Shapleigh, the BRAC commission considered three primary factors to make its decision: The military value of Fort Bliss, the potential for other branches of the armed service to use a post as large as Fort Bliss, and the lack of urban encroachment around Fort Bliss that would otherwise hinder its growth. The arrival of the 11,500 troops from the 1st Armored Division was also expected to create some 20,196 direct and indirect military and civilian jobs in El Paso.

According to the Department of Defense, this is the largest net gain in the United States tied to the Base Realignment and Closure recommendations. Of the 20,196 new jobs expected to come to El Paso as a result of Bliss's realignment, 9,000 would be indirect civilian jobs created by the influx of soldiers to the "Sun City". When the BRAC commission recommendations were released Senator Kay Bailey Hutchison's spokesman reported that El Paso was the only area that came out with a major gain of forces.

The news that El Paso had been selected to receive major elements of the 1st Armored Division was met with joy, but at the same time many expressed surprise at the panel's recommendation to transfer the Air Defense Artillery School, 6th ADA Brigade, and its accompanying equipment, including the MIM-104 Patriot Missile Anti-Aircraft/Anti Missile defense system, to Fort Sill. In August, officials representing Fort Bliss went before the BRAC Commission to plead their case for maintaining the ADA school and its accompanying equipment at Fort Bliss, citing among other thing the size of Fort Bliss and the history of the ADA school in the region. The BRAC Commission ultimately ruled against Fort Bliss, (Note: The cost savings for not moving the ADA school were found to be smaller than the effect of consolidating 8 smaller locations into 4 Joint Pre-Deployment/Mobilization Platforms, of which Fort Bliss/Holloman is one.) and the roughly 4,500 affected soldiers were transferred to Fort Sill, Oklahoma. The entire transfer of soldiers to and from Fort Bliss was completed no later than September 2011.

In June 2009, authority over the post was shifted from Training and Doctrine Command to Forces Command.

=== 2009–present ===
A 2010 joint study by Fort Bliss and El Paso-area city governments found that desalination was a viable method for increasing El Paso's water supply by 25%. The Kay Bailey Hutchison Desalination Plant, on Montana Avenue, is located on Fort Bliss property, and desalinates the groundwater of the Hueco Bolson for use by El Paso and Fort Bliss. This reverse-osmosis plant protects the fresh groundwater supplies from invasion by more brackish water. This plant is currently the largest non-seawater desalination plant in the world.

In 2010, with the assumption of command by Major General Dana J.H. Pittard, a local that grew up in El Paso, Fort Bliss was made an "open post" which allowed anyone with a valid driver's license to enter the post. From 2015, Fort Bliss was no longer an open post. In 2020, 1st Armored Division's Operations Research and Systems Analysis officer (ORSA) created a COVID-19 progression rate model for the division. This model was used by the COVID-19 task force for the City of El Paso.

In July 2010, electric power consumption at Fort Bliss had been reduced by three megawatts as the base continued to work towards becoming a "net zero" energy installation. In 2011 the 1st Armored Division moved from Baumholder, Germany to Fort Bliss, prompting significant expansion at the base in order to accommodate the relocated. In April 2013, Major General Dana J.H. Pittard announced a $120 million project to be completed by 2015, consisting of the largest solar farm within the U.S. military.

In June 2013, an investigation into above-ground dirt-covered bunkers located on the military reservation was opened. These former nuclear weapons bunkers were used by the Air Force during the Cold War, when Biggs Air Force Base was a SAC base. Low level radiation was detected in Bunker 11507. The bunker interiors were previously painted with epoxy paint to contain the radiation, and the paint has now chipped. The radiation contamination is confined to the area around the bunker. The area was closed in July 2013.

=== Camp East Montana ===
On 17 August 2025, an Immigration and Customs Enforcement (ICE) detention facility opened in Fort Bliss. The facility is called Camp East Montana and has a capacity of 1,000—and eventually 5,000—detainees. During its first 50 days, conditions at the camp violated at least 60 federal standards, according to ICE's own detention oversight unit. The ACLU and other human-rights organizations called for its closure after interviewed detainees reported "physical and sexual abuse, medical neglect, and intimidation to self-deport".

== Description ==
Among Fort Bliss's missions:

- Home of America's Tank Division, 1st AD (One of 10 active divisions in the Army)
- Largest Joint Mobilization Force Generation Installation (JMFGI) in DoD (FY19: over 72K): 49K MOB/DeMOB/CRC; 23K Pre Mobilization Exercise Training (PMET)
- One of the largest Power Projection Platforms in the Army
- Home to the Army's ONLY CONUS Replacement Center (CRC)
- Interagency operations: El Paso Intelligence Center (EPIC), Joint Task Force North (JTF-N), Department of Homeland Security (DHS)
- Joint Modernization Command (JMC)(Futures Command) conducts Joint Warfighter Assessments/Enhance Multi-Domain C2/Informs Army Modernization
- Ability to fire any weapon (pistol to missile)
- Provide anti-aircraft and missile defense capabilities.
- Conduct live fire exercises of nearly every type of Army weapon.
- Host joint military exercises with other U.S. and foreign units,
- Be home to many maintenance crews and supply units.
- Be one of the Army's premier bases for test-driving tanks and other equipment.
- House thousands of military vehicles, including all the equipment needed to set up Patriot missile sites.
- Hosted the USAADCEN Air Defense Artillery Center from 1942 to 2010. USAADCEN has completed its transfer to Fort Sill. Concomitantly, the German Air Force Air Defense school is going to move to new training facilities in Germany and Greece. In 2013, the German Air Force deactivated its presence at Fort Bliss, while retaining a presence at Holloman Air Force Base. Over the previous 47 years, over 50,000 German Airmen received training at this command. In 2015, due to funding constraints on the planned new facilities in Europe, the German Air Force Air Defense school will stay open at Fort Bliss until 2020.
- Monitor missile launches conducted by White Sands Missile Range, located 70 miles (110 km) to the north, in New Mexico.
- Hosts the CONUS Replacement Center (CRC), the unit-level training site for Soldiers, Sailors, and Airmen who are deploying or re-deploying on an individual basis. This CRC consolidates several other centers and now serves the entire Continental United States (CONUS).
- A secured drone airfield, with a separate 5000 foot runway and dedicated hangar, 20–25 miles north of the main post is under construction, with completion expected by 2016. It will host a company of 9 MQ-1C Gray Eagles for First Armored Division.

Training missions are supported by the McGregor Range Complex, located some 25 miles (40 km) to the northeast of the main post, in New Mexico. Most of Fort Bliss lies in the state of New Mexico, stretching northeastward along U.S. Route 54 from El Paso County, Texas to the southern boundary of the Lincoln National Forest in Otero County, New Mexico. Much of the northwestward side of Highway 54 is part of the Fort Bliss Military Reservation, ranging from the northern side of Chaparral, New Mexico to the southern boundary of White Sands Missile Range. The main facilities are within the city limits of El Paso, Texas. On the city zoning map, the post officially resides in Central El Paso.

The fort is serviced by the El Paso Independent School District for K–12 education. (Note: The construction of Colin Powell Elementary, the classrooms at Chapin, Bliss, Logan, and Milam are funded by the El Paso Independent School District 2007 Bond, not federal or military funds; the schools are on federal property, but are built, funded and maintained by EPISD – MWR (18 June 2009), "Fort Bliss Town Hall meeting Q&A", The Monitor, Special Section, p. 7)

Separate from the main post are the William Beaumont Army Medical Center, which also serves the warrior transition battalion for the post's wounded warriors, and a Department of Veterans Affairs center at the eastern base of the Franklin Mountains. All of these supporting missions serve the military and retired-military population here, including having served General of the Army Omar N. Bradley in his last days. In June 2011, a new warrior transition complex, located at Marshall and Cassidy roads, was opened to replace the older facility serving the warrior transition battalion. A new location for William Beaumont Army Medical Center, to be located at Spur 601 and Loop 375, is rescheduled to be completed in September 2019.

The installation is close to the El Paso Airport (with easy access from the post via Buffalo Soldier Road), Highway 54, and Interstate 10. There is a replica of the Magoffinsville site for Fort Bliss on post, simulating the adobe style of construction. Other items of interest include the Buffalo Soldier memorial statue at the Buffalo Soldier Gate of entry to the post, and a missile museum on Pleasanton Road.

Building 500 area of Fort Bliss, 2007

Fort Bliss archaeologists manage 20,000 sites on the 1.12 million acre reservation, and serve as tribal liaison to seven federally-funded Indian tribes. The Hueco Tanks historic site in El Paso county is adjacent to the military reservation. Cultural liaison with the tribes at the sacred sites of the reservation is an annual event. The walls of the old Fort Bliss Officers Club contain adobe bricks that are more than a century old. The building houses a Family Readiness Group, where new personnel can learn about the post's activities and support groups. The Fort Bliss Welcome center, for new arrivals, is nearby, in the Building 500 area.

Fort Bliss has been designated a "No Drone Zone" by the FAA, out to 400 feet beyond the lateral edges of the military reservation. This is enforced by the Military Police. Counter-UAS training is available on-post.

== Local impact ==
A Fort Bliss Soldier running up McKelligon Canyon for PT

In 2023, it was estimated that Fort Bliss employed 126,997 individuals and contributed at least 27.9 billion dollars to the Texas economy. Many store owners in El Paso rely on soldiers and army personnel to support their businesses.

Fort Bliss has assisted El Paso during local disasters. In 1897, and in 1925, the fort provided food and housing to those displaced by flood waters. In 2006, Fort Bliss dispatched soldiers and helicopters to the flood-affected areas to help with rescue efforts there.

== Geography ==
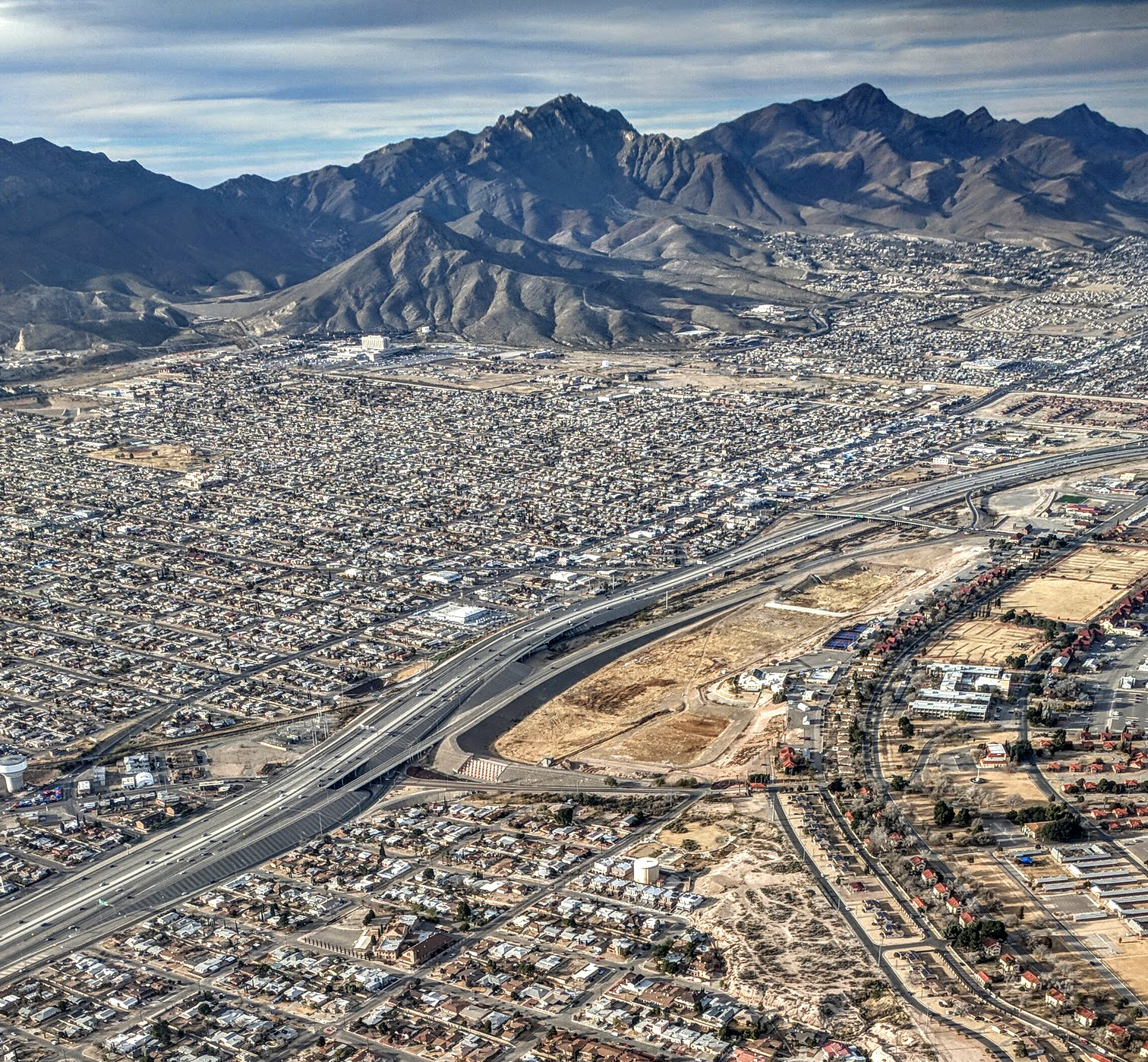
An aerial view of El Paso with Fort Bliss's Armstrong Polo Field in the center. The Pershing Dam flood-control project floods the field when there is storm runoff.

The Fort Bliss census-designated place is located at 31°48′07″N 106°25′29″W. According to the United States Census Bureau, the census-designated place has an area of 6.2 square miles (16.0 km^{2}), all of it land. In terms of its United States physiographic region, it is a southern part of the Basin and Range Province.

== Demographics ==
Fort Bliss CDP
- Census-designated place
- Location of the census-designated place in El Paso County
- Interactive map of Fort Bliss CDP
- Coordinates: 31°50′23″N 106°22′29″W
- Country: United States
- State: Texas
- County: El Paso

Area
  - Total: 17.92 sq mi (46.4 km^{2})
  - Land: 17.92 sq mi (46.4 km^{2})
  - Water: 0 sq mi (0 km^{2})
- Elevation: 3,934 ft (1,199 m)

Population (2020)
  - Total: 11,260
  - Density: 628.3/sq mi (242.6/km^{2})
- Time zone: UTC-6 (CDT)
  - Summer (DST): UTC-5 (CDT)
- GNIS feature ID: 2408232

Historical population
Census	Pop.	Note	%±
1970	13,288		—
1980	12,687		−4.5%
1990	13,915		9.7%
2000	8,264		−40.6%
2010	8,591		4.0%
2020	11,260		31.1%
U.S. Decennial Census; 1850–1900 1910; 1920 1930 1940; 1950 1960 1970; 1980 1990 2000; 2010

Fort Bliss first appeared as an unincorporated community in the 1970 United States census, and as a census-designated place in the 1980 United States census.

Fort Bliss CDP, Texas – Racial and ethnic composition Note: the US Census treats Hispanic/Latino as an ethnic category. This table excludes Latinos from the racial categories and assigns them to a separate category. Hispanics/Latinos may be of any race.
Race / Ethnicity (NH = Non-Hispanic)	Pop 2000	Pop 2010	Pop 2020	% 2000	% 2010	% 2020
White alone (NH)	4,149	5,227	4,880	50.21%	60.84%	43.34%
Black or African American alone (NH)	2,007	1,163	1,438	24.29%	13.54%	12.77%
Native American or Alaska Native alone (NH)	79	115	169	0.96%	1.34%	1.50%
Asian alone (NH)	185	197	777	2.24%	2.29%	6.90%
Native Hawaiian or Pacific Islander alone (NH)	54	27	181	0.65%	0.31%	1.61%
Other race alone (NH)	16	9	92	0.19%	0.10%	0.82%
Mixed race or Multiracial (NH)	178	280	733	2.15%	3.26%	6.51%
Hispanic or Latino (any race)	1,596	1,573	2,990	19.32%	18.31%	26.55%
Total	8,264	8,591	11,260	100.00%	100.00%	100.00%

In the 2020 census there were 11,260 people and 2,282 households living on the post. The population density was 628.3 inhabitants per square mile (242.6/km^{2}). The racial makeup of the post was 58.2% White, 16.5% African American, 2.4% Asian, 1.4% Native American, 0.5% Pacific Islander, and 15.9% from two or more races. Hispanic or Latino of any race were 23.5% of the population.

Of the persons living there 12.4% were under the age of 5, 33.8% were under the age of 18 and 0.1% were over the age of 65. The female percentage was 38.2%. The average household size was 3.82.

The median income for a household on the post was $57,283. The per capita income for the post was $22,181. About 13.1% of the population were below the poverty line.

== Education ==
Fort Bliss is located within the boundaries of the El Paso Independent School District (EPISD). Public schools serving military families residing on the installation are operated by EPISD under agreements involving federally owned property on the post.

Bliss Elementary School is located on the main post and serves family housing areas on the installation, while Milam Elementary School serves residents of the Aero Vista development. Students residing in these areas are zoned to Navarrete Middle School and Captain John L. Chapin High School, or Hartley School and Austin High School, respectively.

The Bundeswehr maintains a school for German national children at Fort Bliss. The 1–12 school was established circa 1976, and in 2016 had 55 students.

== Museums and historic preservation ==
Noel Parade Field, West Fort Bliss. The Franklin Mountains are in the background.

The Replica Museum is located next to the Noel Parade Field and depicts the Post at the Magoffinsville site. This five building museum was authentically constructed with adobe bricks and painted stucco, and includes a sutler store, bunkhouse, blacksmith shop, saddlery, and a pottery kiln. The museum depicts the story of Fort Bliss and El Paso from 1848 to 1948 and was dedicated on the 100th anniversary.

The Fort Bliss and Ironsides Museums are located next to the Athletic Field and includes outdoor and indoor exhibits. These include important historical artifacts from the founding of Fort Bliss to the present day, such as General Pershing's Dodge Command Car and a Patriot Missile.

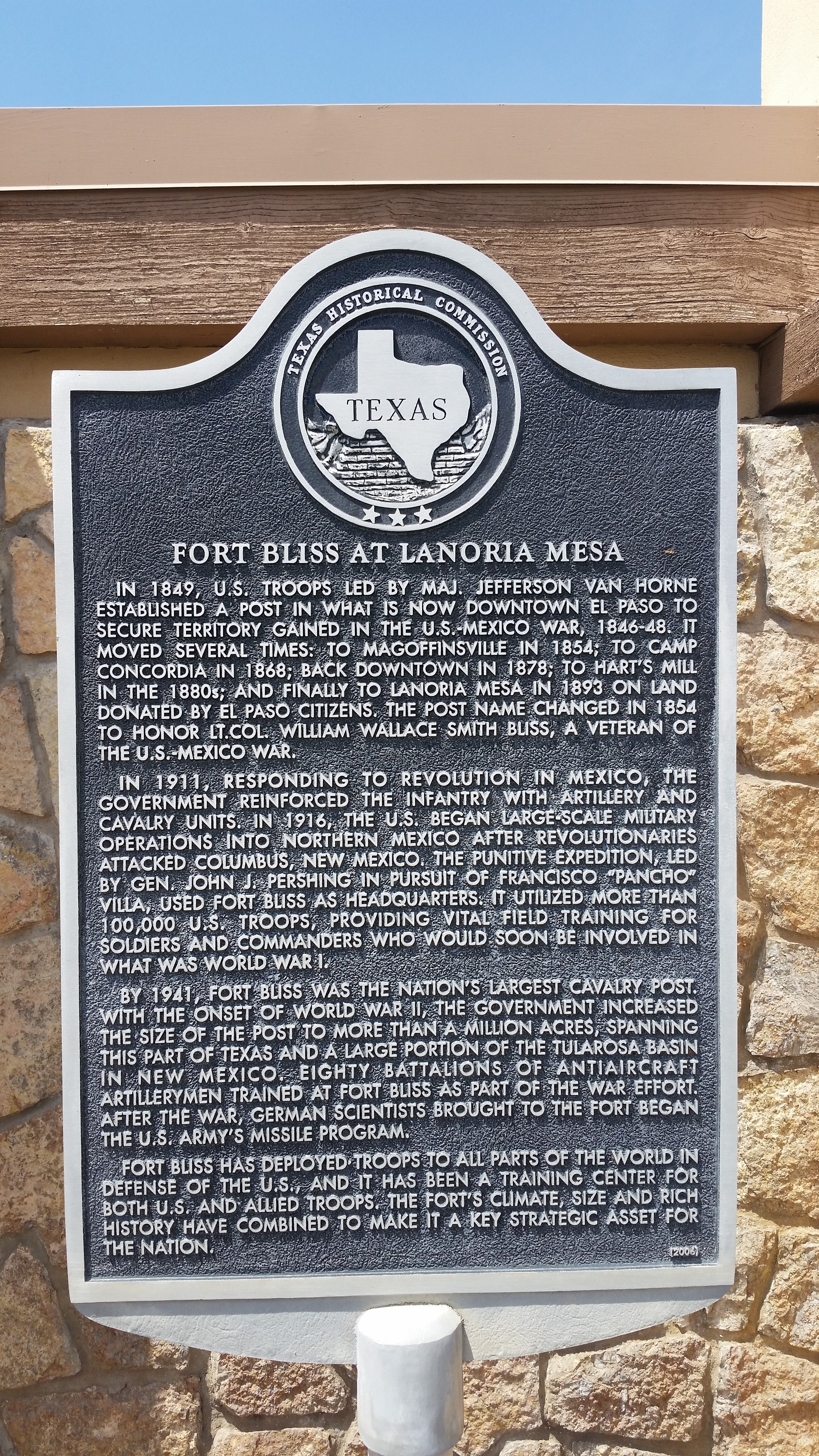
Buffalo Soldier Gate marker explaining the history of the Post opposite El Paso Del Norte from 1849 to the present

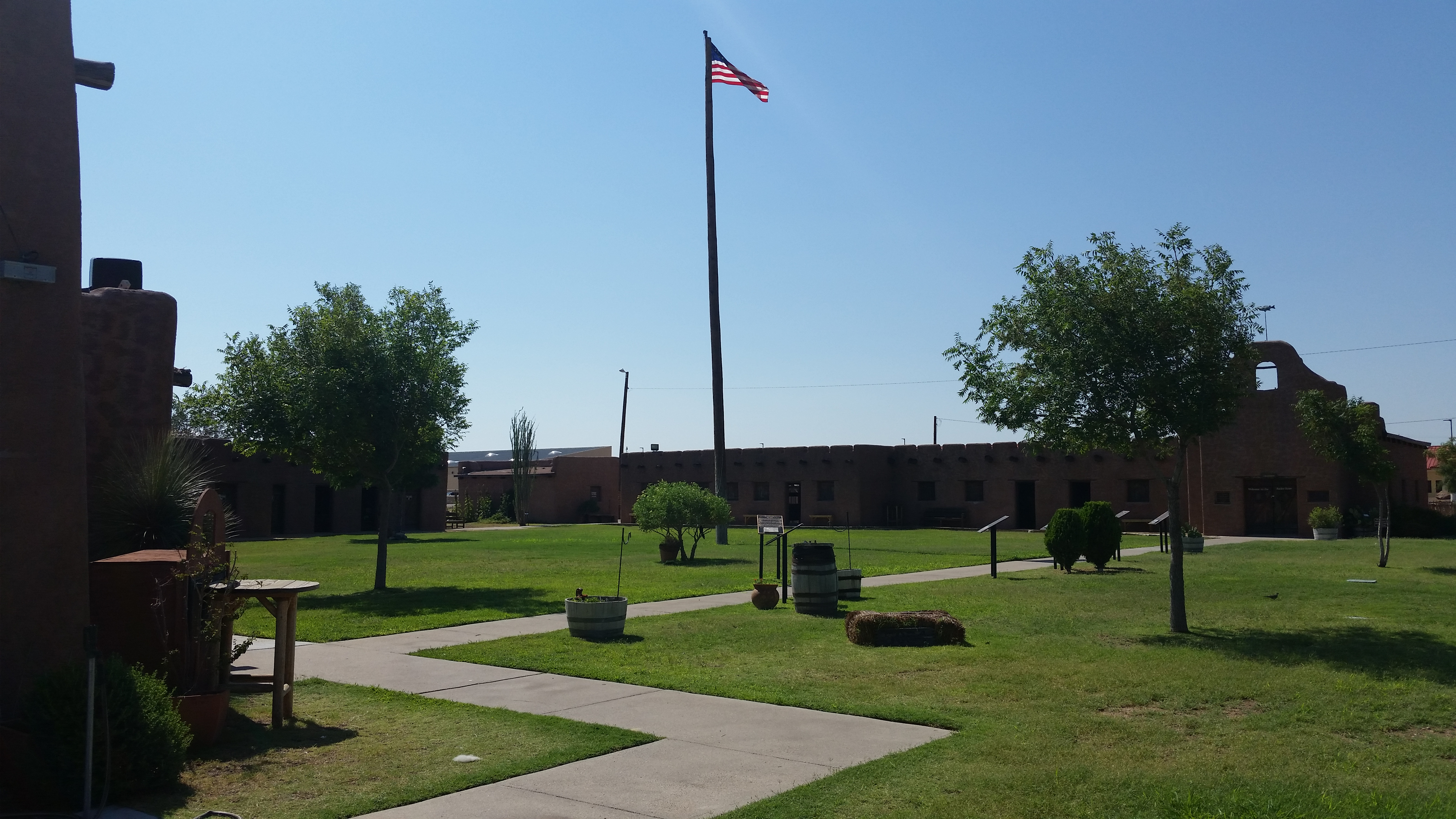
Replica Museum of the Magoffinsville-era fort

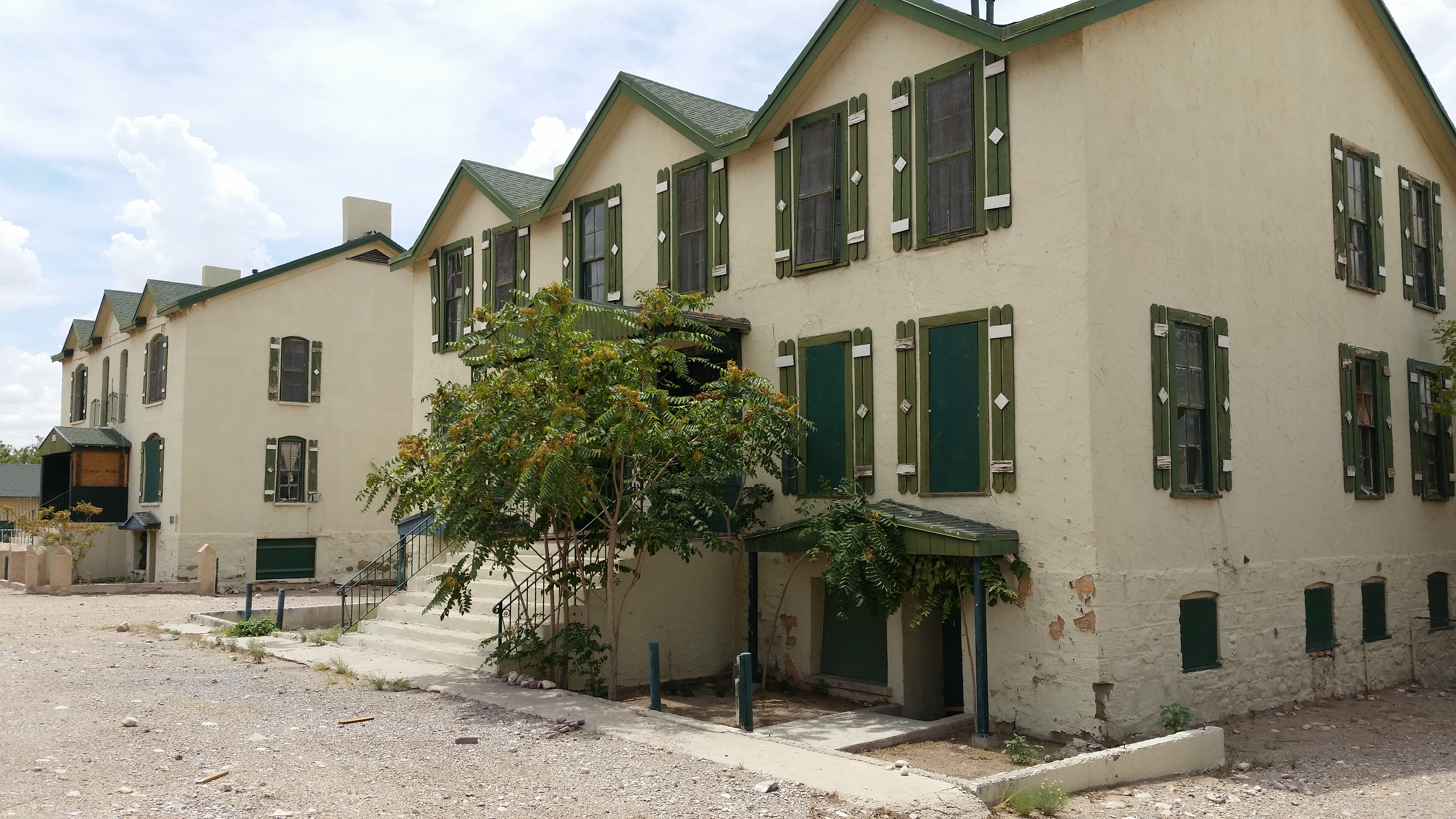
Former Fort Bliss buildings at Hart's Mill location

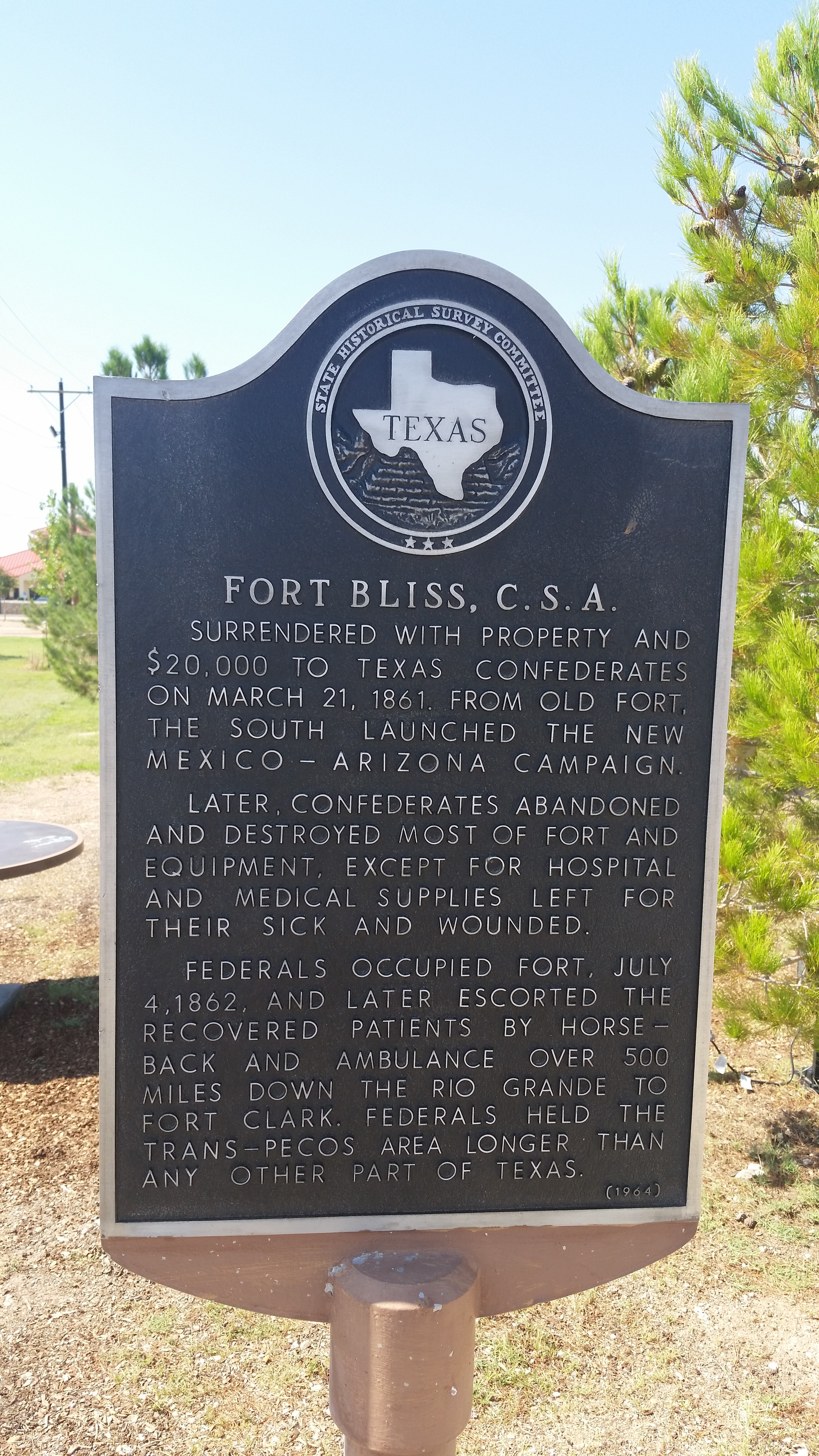
Replica Museum marker explaining the fort's Civil War history

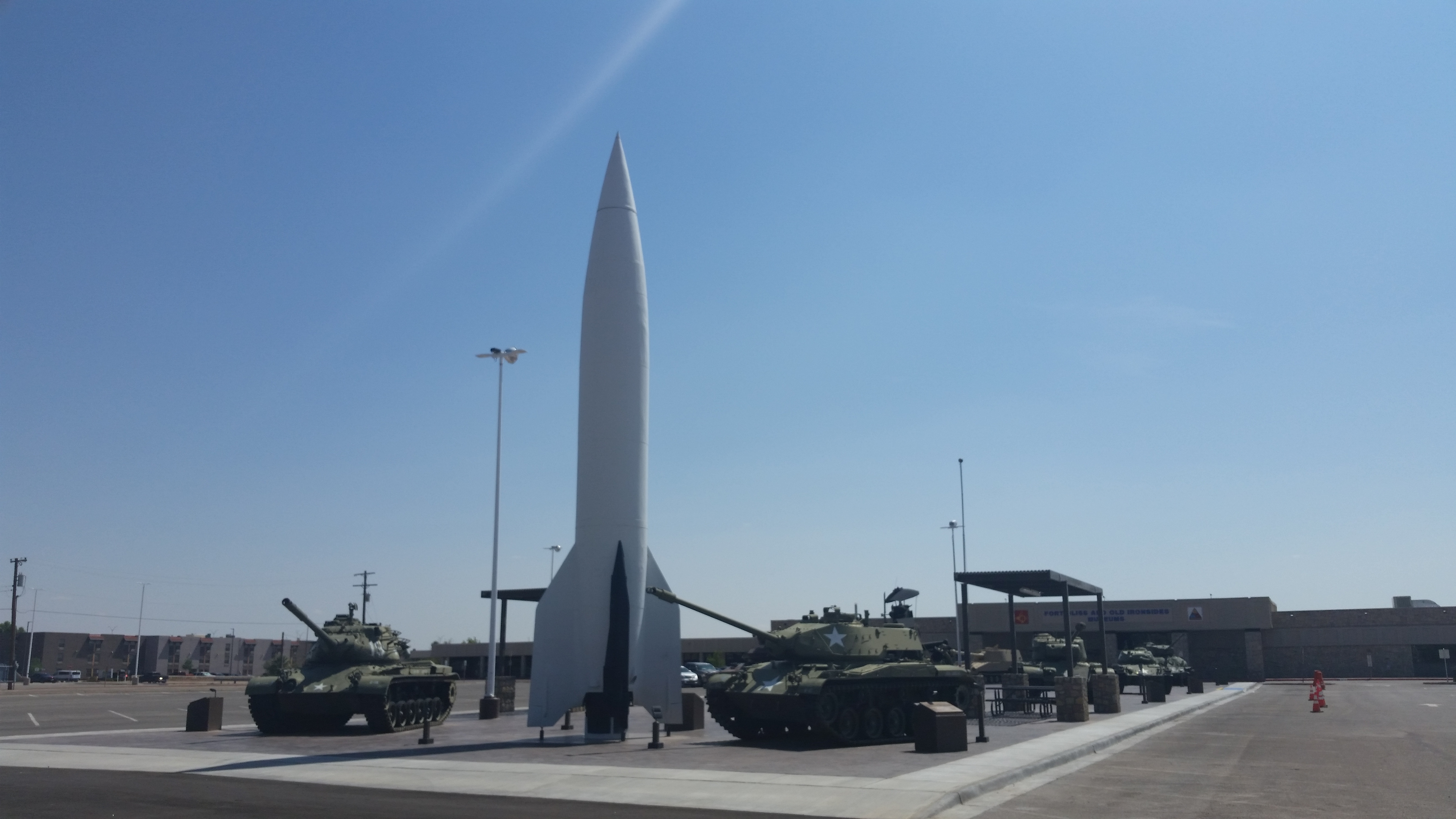
The 2016 outdoor display includes a V-2 rocket.

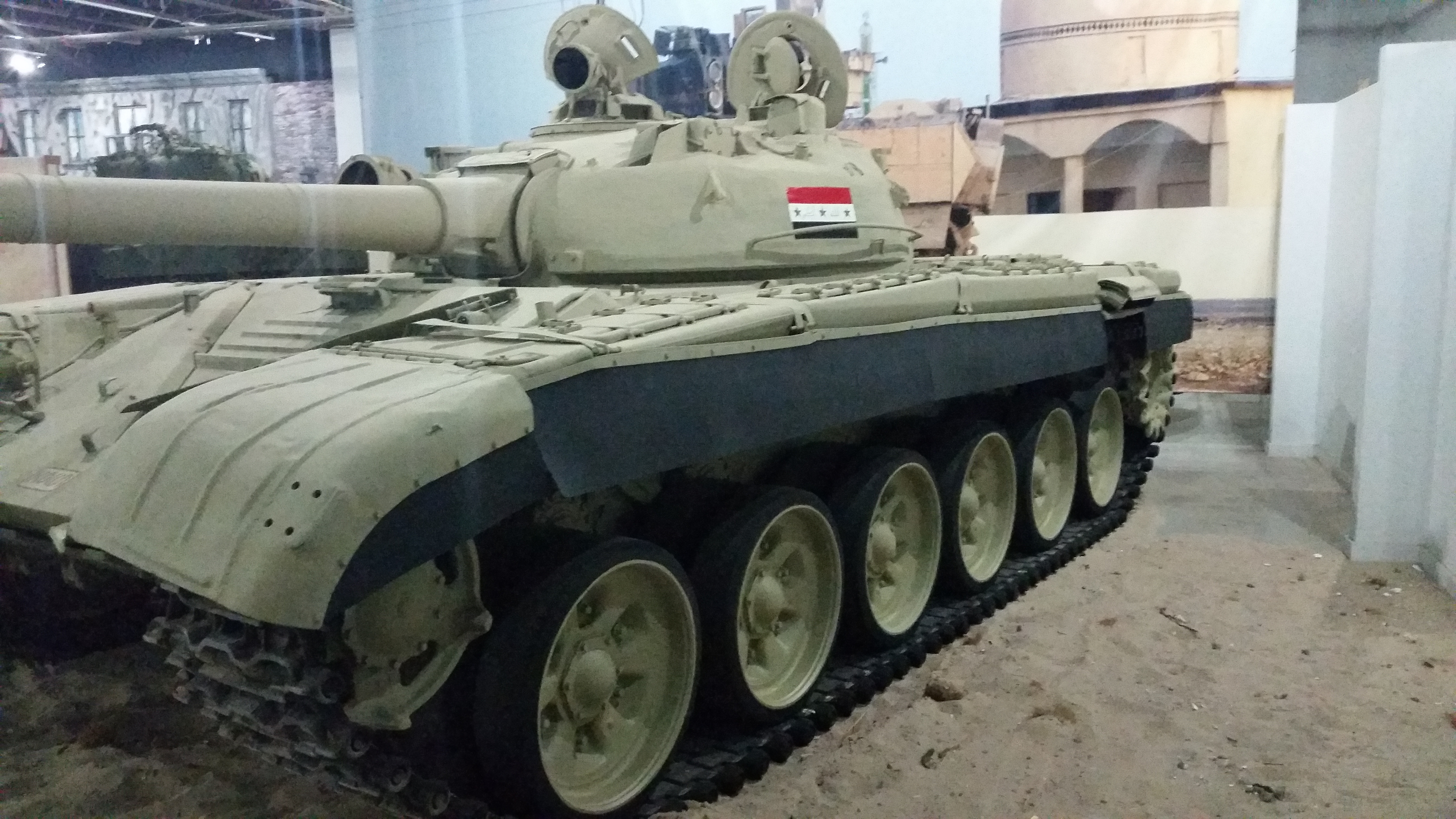
A Gulf War Iraqi T-72

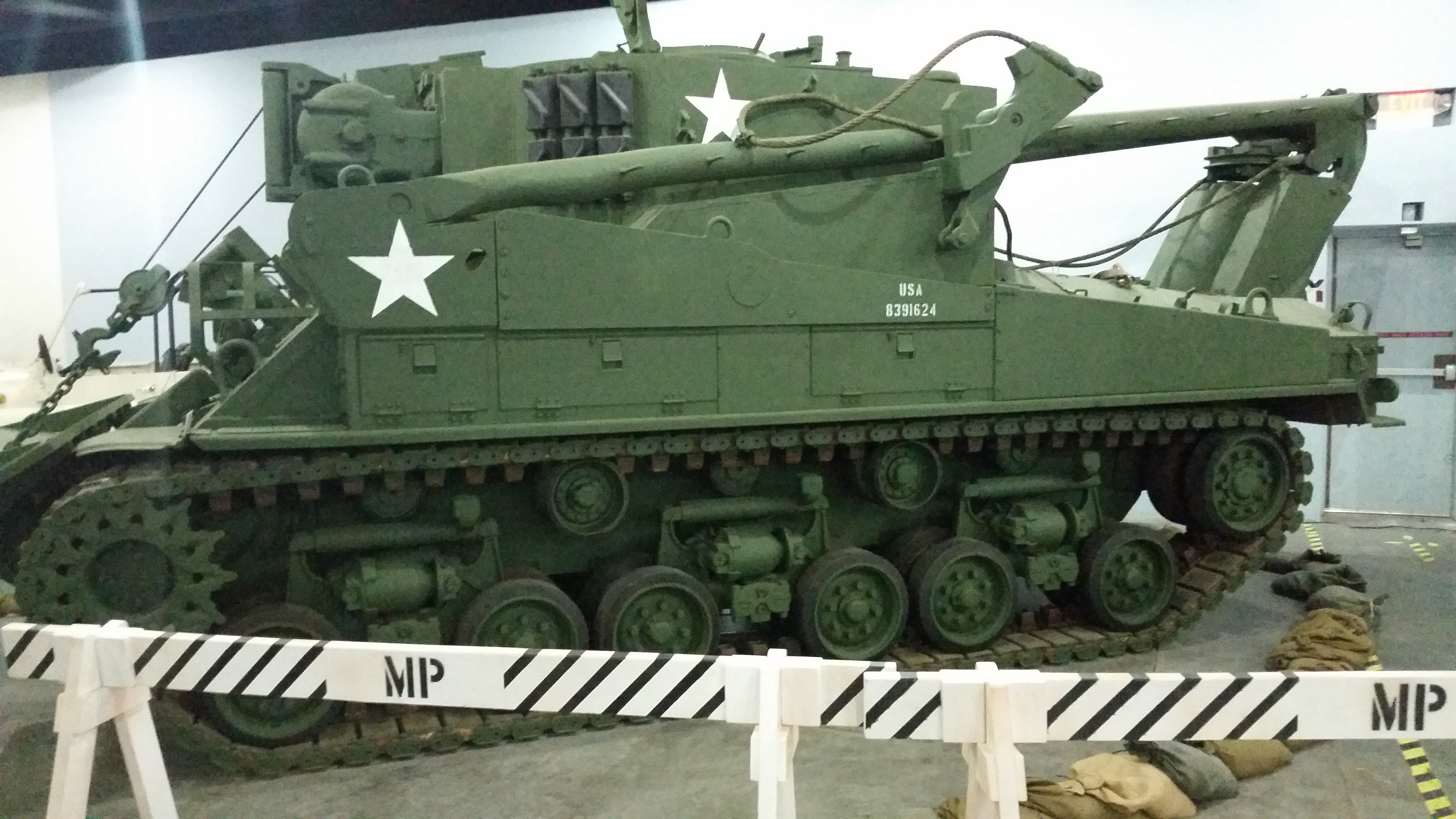
A M742 armored recovery vehicle

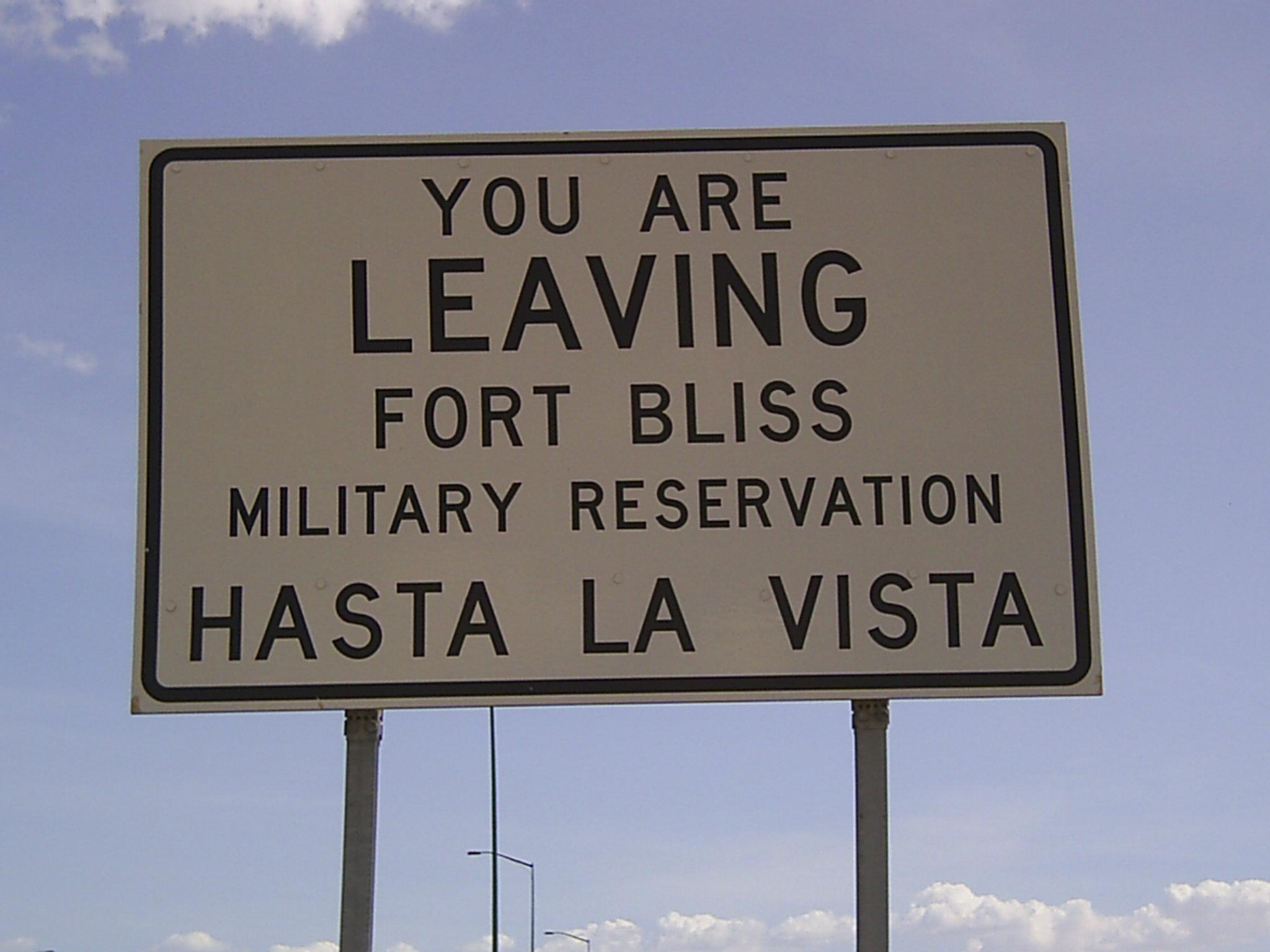
Leaving Fort Bliss

The Fort Bliss Main Post Historic District, a large historic district including 343 buildings deemed to be contributing, was listed on the National Register of Historic Places in 1998.

== See also ==
- 2015 Fort Bliss shooting
- 24th Press Camp Headquarters
- Transformation of the United States Army#Divisions and Brigades
- El Paso metropolitan area
- List of World War II prisoner-of-war camps in the United States
