= 24th Theater Public Affairs Support Element =

US Army unit

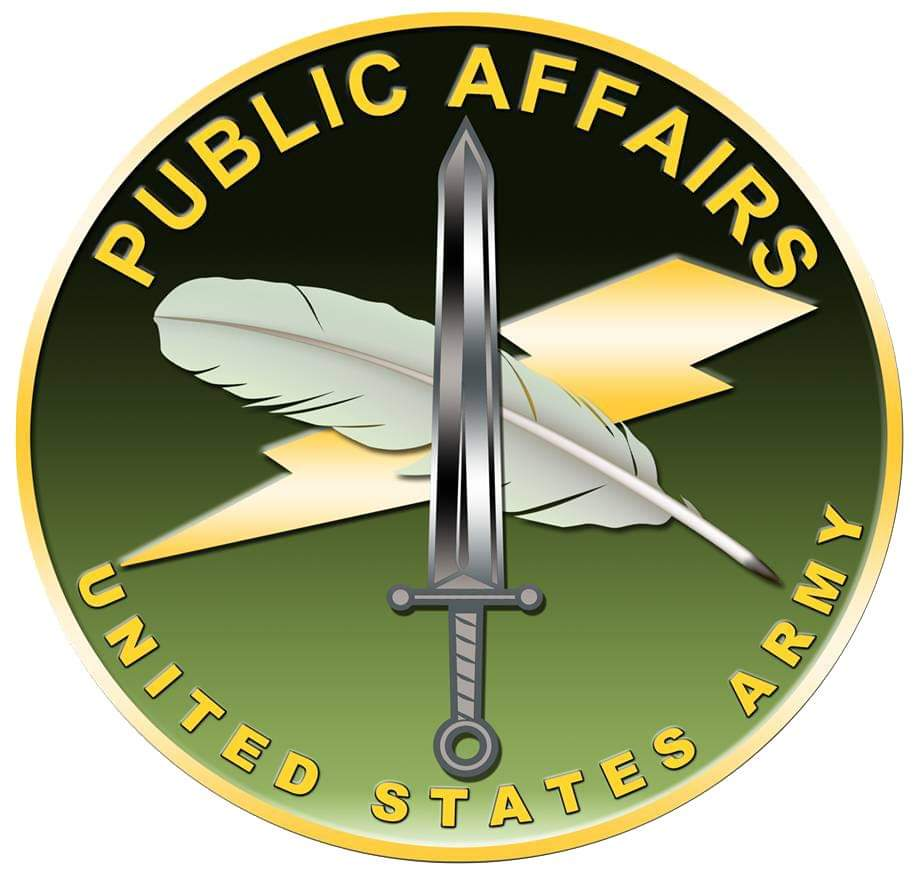
U.S. Army Public Affairs Logo

The 24th Theater Public Affairs Support Element, formerly known as the 24th Press Camp Headquarters (PCH), is an active-duty unit assigned to the United States Army Forces Command; And headquartered at Fort Bliss, Texas. The unit consists of approximately 30 public affairs and support personnel. The command team consists of a lieutenant colonel and a command sergeant major.

One of the primary missions is to operate a media operations center (MOC) in support of media personnel working in the theater of operations. A TPASE provides mission command, staff planning, and supervision of press operations. The TPASE is a highly adaptable unit and can supervise and coordinate operations performed by other public affairs units in support of Army, joint, interagency, intergovernmental, coalition, and multinational partners.

The unit has four teams: command section, media operations section, multimedia section and operations section. The unit is capable of performing a multitude of tasks to include accrediting and escorting up to 100 media personnel a day, producing daily press conferences, acquiring video and photographic imagery and writing news stories, managing social media, and providing commanders with real-time broadcast capabilities.

== History ==
=== Origins and Vietnam War service ===
The 24th Theater Public Affairs Support Element was originally constituted October 26, 1966, in the Regular Army as the 24th Public Information Detachment and officially activated November 3, 1966, at Fort Benjamin Harrison, Indiana.

The 24th PID served twice in Vietnam, from November 3, 1966, to October 15, 1968, and again from June 1, 1969, until June 30, 1970. During the unit’s service in Vietnam, it was awarded three Meritorious Unit Commendations and the Republic of Vietnam Cross of Gallantry with Palm.

=== Reactivation and modern role ===
On March 19, 2009, the U.S. Army designated the former 24th Public Information Detachment as the 24th Press Camp Headquarters and activated the unit at Fort Bliss, Texas, on October 16, 2010.

In October 2011, the 24th Press Camp Headquarters became the first active-duty press camp assigned to the chemical, biological, radiological, and nuclear defense support of civil authorities (CBRN-DSCA) response operations under Joint Task Force-Civil Support (JTF-CS). This one-year defense support of civil authorities (DSCA) mission required the unit to be on 24-hour prepare-to-deploy status to respond to any stateside CBRN incident. The unit again assumed the CBRN-DSCA mission in October 2013 through May 2015.

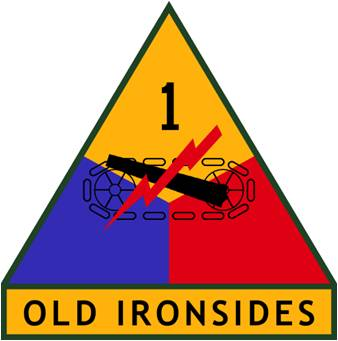
1st Armored Division insignia

Moved under command of the 1st Armored Division Artillery in August 2014, the 24th Theater Public Affairs Support Element also previously served as the headquarters for the 16th Mobile Public Affairs Detachment (MPAD).

The 24th Theater Public Affairs Support Element, alongside several 1st Armored Division elements, received the Meritorious Unit Commendation for its work with Afghan refugees in support of Operation Allies Welcome (OAW) at Doña Ana, New Mexico and Fort Bliss, Texas, in 2021. The award was presented in December 2024.

== Current operations and community engagement ==
The unit actively participates in community events, such as career day, Thanksgiving luncheons with local schools, to foster relationships between the military and civilian communities. In 2024, the TPASE earned the Outstanding Unit Award for its community partnership.

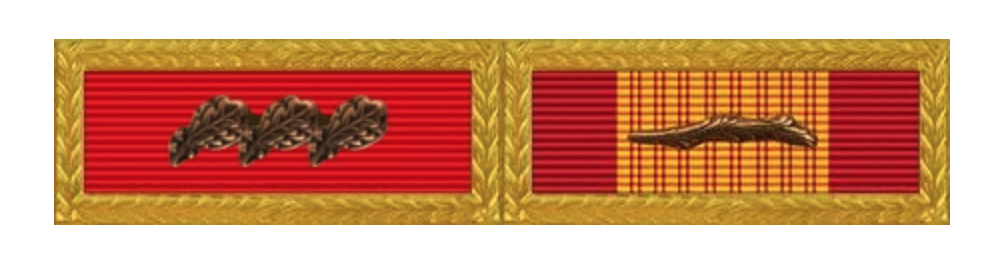
Unit Awards for the 24th TPASE (formerly PID, or PCH)

== Support ==
Soldiers from the 24th and 16th have supported missions including: 75th NATO Summit, Avenger Triad, Joint Task Force - Southern Border, Project Convergence, and Yama Sakura. Since 2005, the unit has deployed Soldiers to numerous countries including: Afghanistan, Colombia, Germany, Indonesia, Iraq, Japan, Kuwait, and Mexico.
