= 402nd Field Artillery Brigade (United States) =

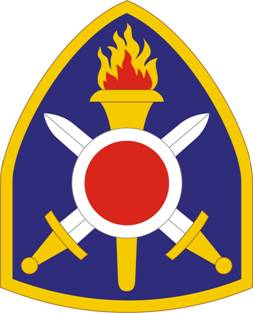
- 402nd FA Brigade shoulder sleeve insignia
- Active: 25 January 1943–26 October 1945 (402d Field Artillery Group); 16 October 1946–22 November 1950; 16 March 1985–16 October 1996 (402d Artillery Bge. Training); 1 December 2006 – 8 July 2015 (402d Artillery Bge. Training Support)
- Country: United States
- Branch: US Army
- Role: Training
- Size: Brigade
- Garrison/HQ: Fort Bliss, Texas
- Engagements: World War II; Northern France; Rhineland; Ardennes-Alsace; Central Europe
- Decorations: Army Superior Unit Award

Insignia
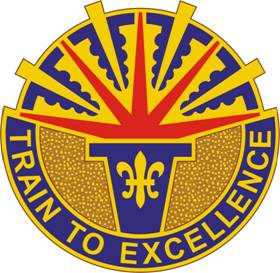
- Distinctive unit insignia

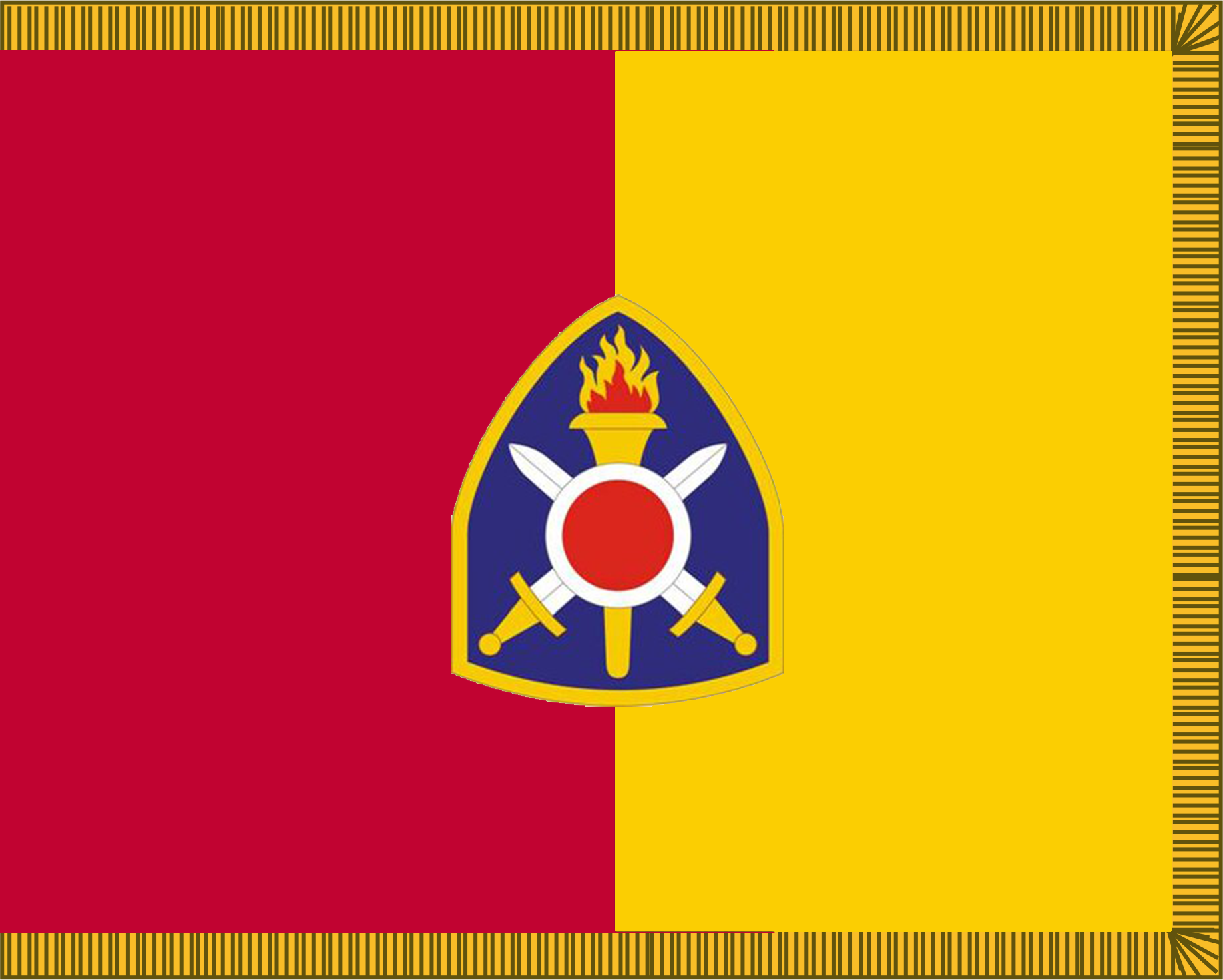
- 402nd Field Artillery Brigade Flag

The 402nd Field Artillery Brigade has been absorbed into the 5th Armored Brigade (United States). The 402nd was an AC/RC/NG unit based at Fort Bliss, Texas. The unit is responsible for training selected United States Army Reserve & Army National Guard units along the West coast. The unit was formerly designated as 3rd Brigade, 91st Infantry Division, and as the 402nd Brigade (Training). The Brigade is a subordinate unit of the First United States Army (First Army Division West). From 1985 to 1996, the Brigade conducted artillery training at Fort Sill, Oklahoma.

In 2006, as part of the Army's Transformation of the United States Army, the 3rd Brigade was redesignated as the 402nd Field Artillery Brigade. The 402nd Field Artillery Brigade was constituted 25 January 1943 in the United States Army as Headquarters and Headquarters Battery, 402nd Field Artillery Group and later activated on 15 March 1943 at Camp Butner, North Carolina. The unit participated in the following campaigns during World War II: Northern France, Rhineland, Ardennes-Alsace (Battle of the Bulge) and Central Europe. Inactivated 26 October 1945 at Camp Kilmer, New Jersey. Redesignated 16 March 1985 as Headquarters and Headquarters Battery, 402nd Brigade (Training) and activated at Lawton, Oklahoma, assigned to the 95th Training Division. It was organized with a command section, a training committee, and five subordinate battalions with 24 training batteries. The battalions were designed as unit of the 89th Field Artillery Regiment, with the 1st Battalion in Tulsa, Oklahoma; the 2nd Battalion in Amarillo, Texas; the 3rd Battalion in Denton, Texas, the 4th Battalion in the vicinity of Fort Worth, Texas; and the 5th Battalion in Wichita Falls, Texas.

On 25 January 1991, the 402nd Brigade (Training) was mobilized in support of Operations Desert Shield/Storm. Detached from the 95th Training Division and attached to the U.S. Army Field Artillery Training Center, Fort Sill, Oklahoma. Inactivated 16 October 1996 at Lawton, Oklahoma. On 1 December 2006 the Headquarters & Headquarters Battery and Headquarters, 402nd Brigade (Training) withdrew from the Army Reserve and allotted to the Regular Army and redesignated as Headquarters activated at Travis Air Force Base, California.

== Mission ==
The 402nd Field Artillery Brigade mission is to conduct post mobilization training for Army Reserve units and convoy/entry control point live fire training and detainee operations for U.S. Army Soldiers, Air Force Airmen, and Navy Sailors. The 402nd Field Artillery has trained in excess of 15,000 service members since being mobilized to Ft. Bliss, Texas, in 2004.

The Continental United States (CONUS) Replacement Center (CRC) is under the control of this brigade, now serving as the single deployment and redeployment point for all ranks and all services, for validating the training of all personnel who will be deploying on a non-unit basis.

== Subordinate units ==
- Headquarters and Headquarters Company, 402nd Field Artillery Brigade
- 3rd Battalion (Logistics Support), 356th Regiment
- 2nd Battalion (Combat Support/Combat Service Support), 360th Regiment
- 1st Battalion (Combat Support/Combat Service Support), 363rd Regiment
- 2nd Battalion (Combat Support/Combat Service Support), 363rd Regiment
- 3rd Battalion (Combat Support/Combat Service Support), 363rd Regiment
- CONUS Replacement Center "Vipers"

=== Campaign credit ===
Conflict	Streamer	Year(s)
World War II	Northern France	1944
World War II	Rhineland	1944–1945
World War II	Ardennes-Alsace	1944–1945
World War II	Central Europe	1945

== Decorations ==
Ribbon	Award	Year	Orders
	Army Superior Unit Award	2008-2011	Permanent Orders 332–07 announcing award of the Army Superior Unit award
