= 5th Armored Brigade (United States) =

- 5th Armored Brigade shoulder sleeve insignia (SSI)
- Active: 1942–45; 1951–56; 1975–99; 2006–present
- Country: United States
- Allegiance: United States Army
- Branch: Armor
- Role: Combined Arms Training Brigade
- Size: Brigade
- Part of: 85th Support Command
- Garrison/HQ: Fort Bliss
- Nickname: Dagger Brigade
- Motto: Sharpen the Edge!
- Decorations: Army Superior Unit Award

Commanders
- Commander: Douglas F. Serie
- Command Sergeant Major: CSM Deondre L. Long

Insignia
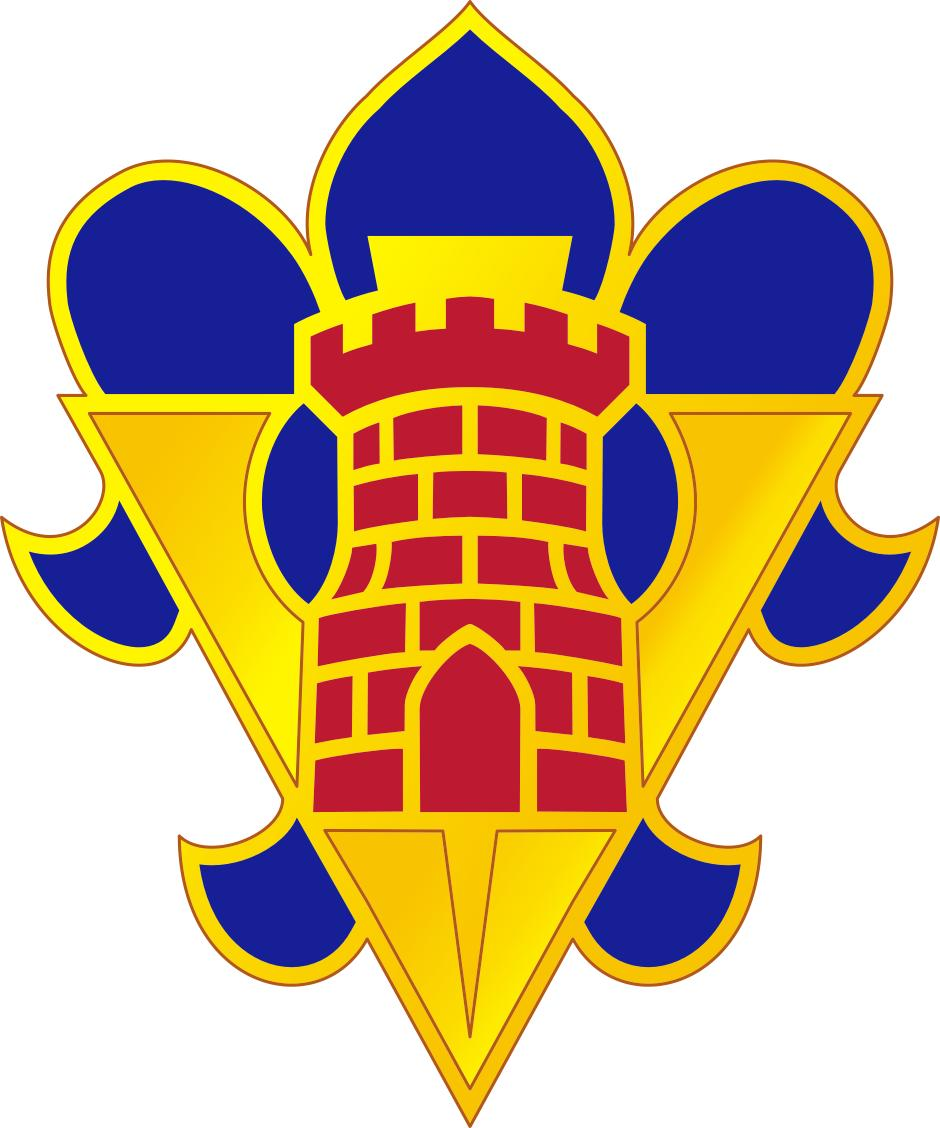
- Distinctive unit insignia

- Designated but not authorized SSI

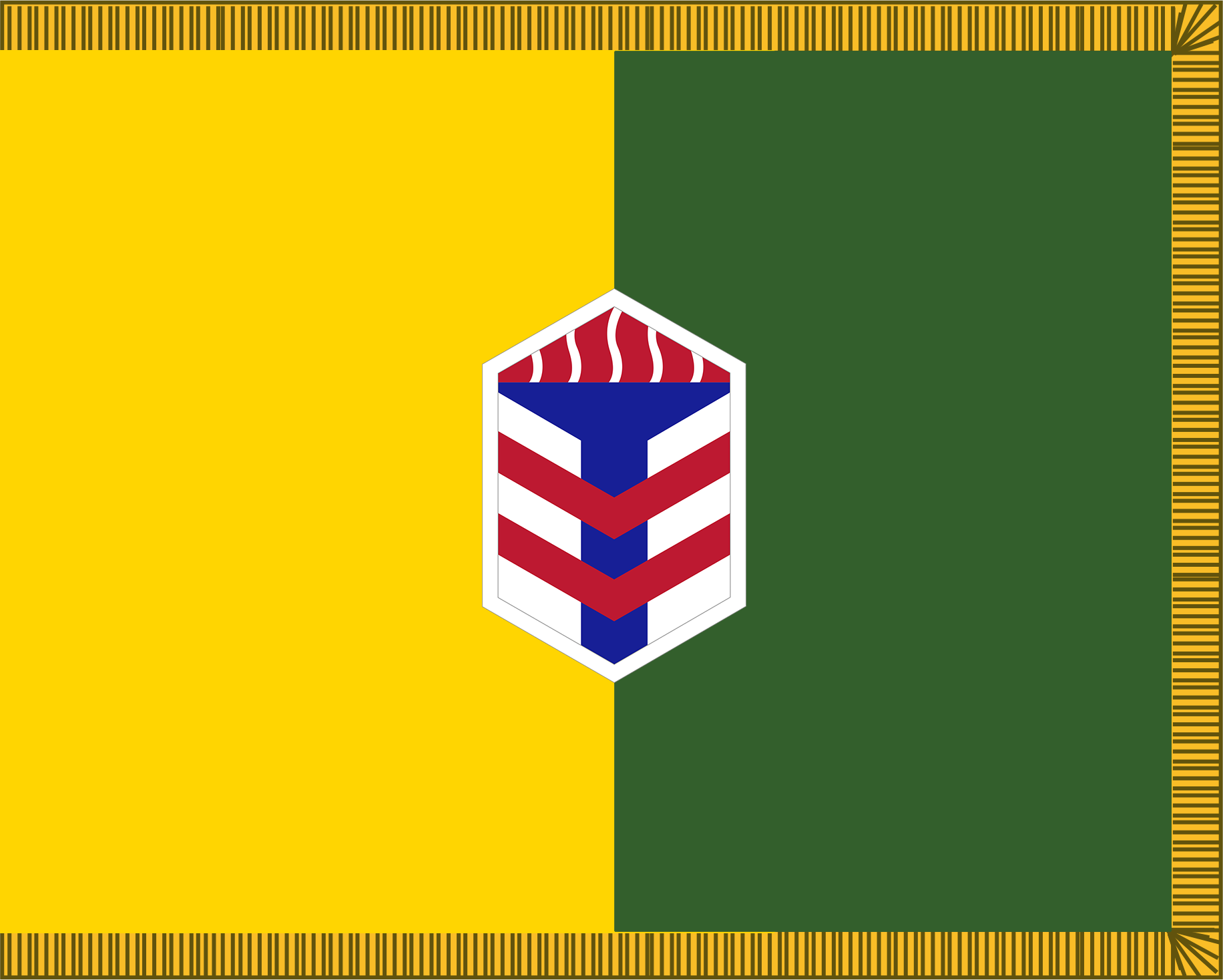
- 5th Armored Brigade Flag

The 5th Armored Brigade is an AC/RC (active component/reserve component) unit based at Fort Bliss, Texas. The unit is responsible for training selected United States Army Reserve (USAR) & Army National Guard units west of the Mississippi River before they deploy to conduct combat operations overseas. The unit was formerly designated as 2nd Brigade, 91st Division. In 2006, the brigade trained the Military Transition Teams at Fort Riley before the mission was assigned to the 1st Brigade, 1st Infantry Division. In 2007, the brigade was reassigned from Fort Carson, Colorado to Fort Bliss, Texas.

The brigade was redesignated and re-missioned several times:

- 5th Tank Destroyer Group 1942–1945 (one of 14 activated for World War II)
- 5th Armored Cavalry Regiment 1951–1954 (as a USAR unit in Lincoln, Nebraska)
- 5th Armored Group 1954–1956
- 5th Brigade (Training) 1975–1995, Lincoln, Nebraska
- In 1999 the 5th was merged with the 2d Brigade, 91st Division and carried the latter name and lineage until redesignated in 2006.
- In 2015, the 5th absorbed the 402nd Field Artillery Brigade, whose commander assumed command of the merged units.

== Organization ==
The 5th Armored Brigade is a Combined Arms Training Brigade (CATB) assigned to the 85th Support Command. Like all formations of the 85th Support Command, the brigade is not a combat formation, but instead trains Army Reserve and Army National Guard units preparing for deployment. As of January 2026, the brigade consists of a Headquarters and Headquarters Company, six active duty battalions, and five reserve battalions.

- 5th Armored Brigade, at Fort Bliss (TX)
  - Headquarters and Headquarters Company, at Fort Bliss (TX)
  - 1st Battalion, 289th Regiment (Training Support), at Ellington Field Joint Reserve Base (TX)
  - 2nd Battalion, 290th Regiment (Training Support), in Mustang (OK)
  - 2nd Battalion, 356th Regiment (Brigade Engineer Battalion), at Fort Bliss (TX)
  - 1st Battalion, 360th Regiment (Infantry), at Fort Bliss (TX)
  - 1st Battalion, 361st Regiment (Brigade Support Battalion), at Fort Bliss (TX)
  - 3rd Battalion, 361st Regiment (Training Support), in Denver (CO)
  - 2nd Battalion, 362nd Regiment (Field Artillery), at Fort Bliss (TX)
  - 3rd Battalion, 362nd Regiment (Infantry), at Fort Bliss (TX)
  - 2nd Battalion, 363rd Regiment (Training Support), in Mesa (AZ)
  - 1st Battalion, 382nd Regiment (Logistical Support), at Fort Bliss (TX)
  - 3rd Battalion, 410th Regiment (Brigade Engineer Battalion), at Fort Bliss (TX)

The brigade's four training support battalions and logistical support battalion are Army Reserve formations.

== Decorations ==
Ribbon	Award	Year	Orders
	Army Superior Unit Award	2008-2011	Permanent Orders 332-07 announcing award of the Army Superior Unit award
