= Mexican–American War campaigns =

The following are synopsis of the campaigns of the Mexican–American War (1846–1848).

== Introduction ==
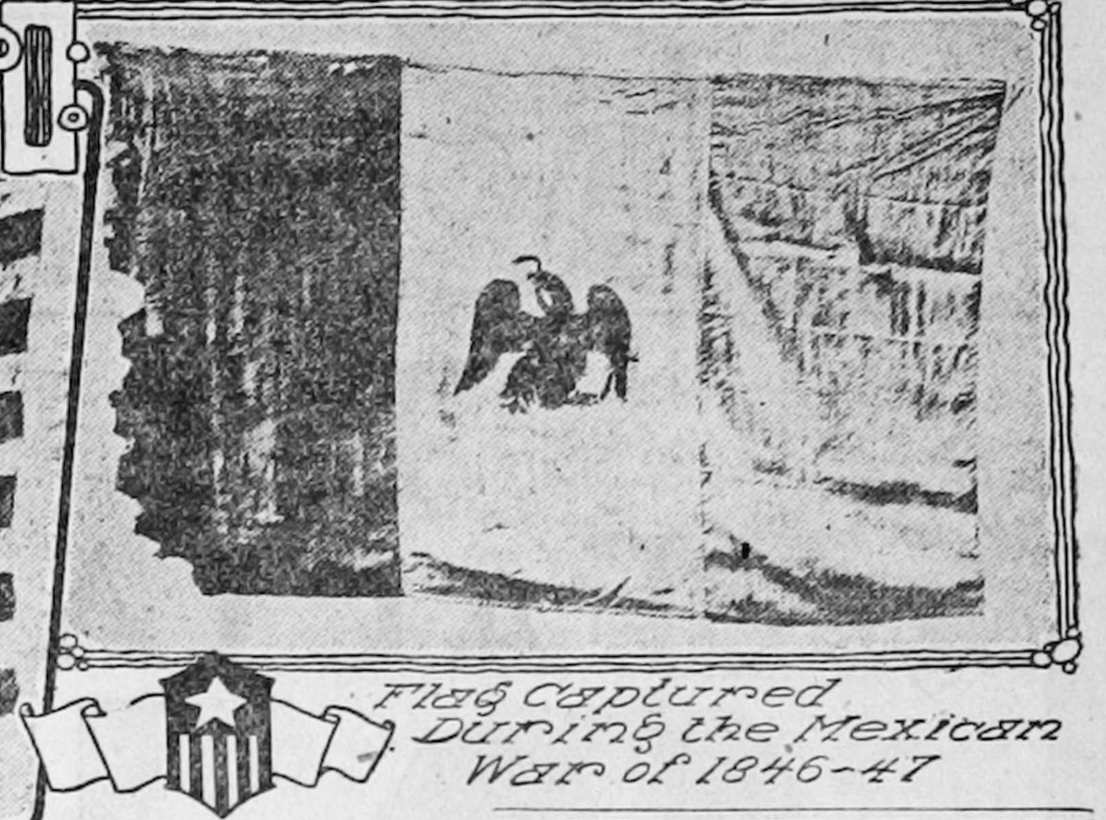
Photograph of the Mexican-American War Flag from 1846-47

The Mexican–American War (1846–48) was the U.S. Army's first experience waging an extended conflict in a foreign land. This brief war is often overlooked by casual students of history since it occurred so close to the American Civil War and is overshadowed by the latter's sheer size and scope. Yet, the War was instrumental in shaping the geographical boundaries of the United States. At the conclusion of this conflict, the U.S. had added some one million square miles of territory, including what today are the states of Texas, Arizona, New Mexico, and California, as well as portions of Colorado, Wyoming, Utah, and Nevada. Despite this, Mexican Americans were put into manual labor, excavating this new terrain to be usable during combat. The war would continue to cause conflict between fellow Americans, with Mexican American families commonly falling victim to institutional racism, and sparking debates for their civil rights. This newly acquired land also became a battleground between advocates for the expansion of slavery and those who fought to prevent its spread. These sectional and political differences ripped the fabric of the union of states and eventually contributed to the start of the American Civil War, just 13 years later. In addition, the Mexican–American War was a proving ground for a generation of U.S. Army leaders who, as junior officers in Mexico, learned the trade of war and latter applied those lessons to the Civil War.

The Mexican–American War lasted some 26 months from its first engagement through the withdrawal of American occupation troops. Fighting took place over thousands of miles, from northern Mexico to Mexico City, and across New Mexico, California, Baja California and the west coast of Mexico.

== Texas Campaign ==
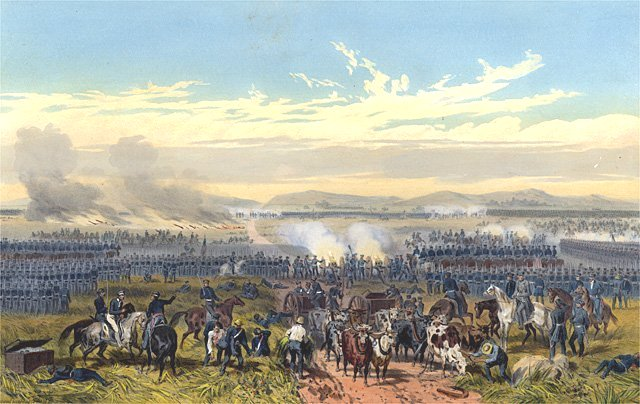
Battle of Palo Alto during the Mexican-American War, painting by Carl Nebel. Published in the 1851 book "The War Between the United States and Mexico, Illustrated".

=== Palo Alto, May 8, 1846 ===
Conditions had been steadily worsening along the Rio Grande. The United States claimed the Rio Grande as the international border while the Mexican Government claimed the Nueces was the proper border. Early in 1846, General Zachary Taylor built a fort on the Rio Grande opposite the Mexican town of Matamoros. In April, the Mexicans countered by sending a force of about 1600 cavalrymen across the Rio Grande where, on April 25, they overwhelmed a force of 60 dragoons under U.S. Captain S. B. Thornton. Mexican forces at Matamoros steadily grew stronger in April. By the end of the month, General Taylor had become concerned about his lines of communication with his lightly held main base at Point Isabel, near the mouth of the Rio Grande. Therefore, on May 1, Taylor moved the bulk of his army to Point Isabel, leaving a small detachment of artillery and infantry under Maj. Jacob Brown at the fort opposite Matamoros. The Mexicans soon placed this fort (later named Fort Brown) under heavy attack. On May 7, Taylor moved to the rescue with about 2,300 men. On the morning of May 8, when little more than halfway to the fort, the Americans came face to face with the enemy, a force numbering perhaps as many as 6,000 men, commanded by General Mariano Arista. Its right flank rested on an elevation known as Palo Alto (after which the engagement was named). Taylor moved unhesitatingly into battle, using his artillery to cover the deployment of the infantry. The engagement continued until nightfall, when the Mexicans withdrew. Effective use of artillery fire was largely responsible for the American victory. American losses were 9 killed and 47 wounded. The Mexicans suffered more than 700 casualties, including about 320 deaths.

=== Resaca de la Palma, May 9, 1846 ===
The next morning, Taylor, continuing his advance, found the Mexicans a few miles down the road, where they had taken up a strong defensive position in a dry river bed known as the Resaca de la Palma. In this second successive day of battle, the infantry conducted most of the action, although the dragoons played an important part in knocking out the enemy artillery. Eventually the infantry turned the enemy's left flank, and the Mexican line broke and fled. The rout became a race for the Rio Grande which the Mexicans won, but many were drowned while attempting to cross the river. Taylor's losses were 33 killed and 89 wounded. Arista's official report listed 160 Mexicans killed, 228 wounded, and 159 missing, but Americas estimated that the Mexicans had suffered well over a thousand casualties. Taylor had to wait until May 18 for boats to move his army across the Rio Grande. When the Americans finally moved into Matamoros, they found that the Mexican force had disappeared into the interior. The next objective was Monterey, but the direct overland route from Matamoros lacked water and forage; Taylor therefore waited until August for the arrival of steamboats, with which he moved his army 130 miles (210 km) upriver to Camargo. Meanwhile, thousands of volunteers had poured into Matamoros, but disease and various security and logistic factors limited Taylor to a force of little more than 6,000 men for the Monterey campaign.

== California Campaign 1846-1847 ==
The California Campaign (1846–1847) of the Mexican–American War, in Mexican Alta California. The 1848 treaty, and the California Gold Rush, brought California statehood in 1850

== Northern Mexican Theater ==
=== Monterrey, September 21, 1846 ===
Taylor's forces left Camargo at the end of August and launched an attack on Monterrey on September 21, 1846. The city was defended by a force of from 7,300 to 9,000 Mexican troops under the command of Gen. Pedro de Ampudia. After three days of hard fighting the Americans drove the enemy from the streets to the central plaza. On September 24, Ampudia offered to surrender the city on the condition that his troops be allowed to withdraw unimpeded and that an eight-week armistice go into effect. Taylor, believing that his mission was simply to hold northern Mexico, accepted the terms and the Mexican troops evacuated the city the following day. Ampudia reported that his army had suffered 367 casualties in the three-day fight. Taylor reported his losses as being 120 killed and 368 wounded. Both reports were probably underestimates. Taylor was severely criticized in Washington for agreeing to the Mexican terms, and the Administration promptly repudiated the armistice, which had almost expired by the time the news reached Monterrey

Meanwhile, in keeping with the strategic plan, the other two prongs of advance into northern Mexico had been put in motion. On June 5, 1846, Brig. Gen. John E. Wool had left San Antonio with his "Army of the Center", a force of some 2,000 men. His original objective was Chihuahua, but en route it was changed to Parras. Wool, encountering no opposition, arrived at Parras on December 5; his force then became part of Taylor's command. Col. Alexander William Doniphan in command of the 850 men of the 1st Regiment of Missouri mounted volunteers advancing from Santa Fe, New Mexico won on Christmas Day 1846 the Battle of El Brazito (outside modern-day El Paso, Texas) and the Battle of the Sacramento, enabling the capture of the city of Chihuahua

The third prong, Col. (later Maj. Gen.) Stephen W. Kearny's "Army of the West", a force of about 1,660 men, left Fort Leavenworth, Kansas early in June 1846 and captured Santa Fe, New Mexico unopposed on August 18. After leaving about 800 men of the 2nd Regiment of Missouri mounted volunteers to secure Santa Fe, Kearny left for California on September 25 with about 300 mostly mule mounted men of the 1st Dragoons. En route he met a party, led by Kit Carson, bringing dispatches from the west coast that the navy's Pacific Squadron's sailors and marines under Commodore John D. Sloat and Commodore Robert Stockton, with the help of volunteers in the "California Battalion" under Capt. John C. Fremont, had won peaceful possession of California in July, although some opposition remained. Kearny sent back 200 of his men and pushed on with the rest, arriving at San Diego on December 12 after having fought a sharp engagement with dampened powder on December 6 with a larger force of Californians at the Battle of San Pasqual where he lost 19 men killed—the most in all California skirmishes. At San Diego, Kearny joined Commodore Robert F. Stockton, who had replaced Sloat, and their combined force of some 600 men (volunteer militia, sailors, marines and Dragoons) after same minor skirmishing, re-occupied Los Angeles, California on January 10, 1847, with no casualties. Three days later, the last remaining Californian opposition capitulated to the very generous terms in the Treaty of Cahuenga to the volunteer force of about 450 men commanded by Fremont.

Meanwhile, in mid-November 1846, Taylor had sent one of his divisions to occupy the city of Saltillo. Another detachment occupied Victoria, a provincial capital between Monterey and the port of Tampico, the latter having been occupied by an American naval force under Comdr. David Conner on November 15, 1846. Thus, by the end of 1846, a very large part of northern Mexico had come under American control. A plan was adopted late in 1846 to strike at Mexico City by way of Vera Cruz. In preparation for this expedition Maj. Gen. Winfield Scott, Commanding General of the Army, detached about 8,000 men from Taylor's command early in 1847, ordering the troops to Gulf ports to wait sea transportation. Taylor was left with some 4,800 men, practically all volunteers, most or whom he concentrated in a camp south of Saltillo.

=== Buena Vista, February 22–23, 1847 ===
General Santa Anna, Presidente of Mexico, had meanwhile taken the field personally and assembled an army at San Luis Potosi. Learning of the weakness of the American forces near Saltillo, Santa Anna moved with about 15,000 men to the attack in February 1847 across about 200 miles (320 km) of desert. Taylor hastily redeployed his force at Buena Vista, where the terrain offered better possibilities for defense. Santa Anna used French tactics in the Battle of Buena Vista, attempting to overwhelm American positions with dense columns of men. Massed volleys of infantry fire and artillery proved effective against the attacking columns, and, after two days of the most severe fighting of the war, Santa Anna, declared victory and withdrew his dispirited army to San Luis Potosi, having lost from 1,500 to 2,000 men killed and wounded. The Americans, outnumbered 3:1 for most of the fight were too exhausted to pursue, had lost 264 killed, 450 wounded, and 26 missing. Many more of Santa Anna's troops died in their retreat back across the desert.

== Pacific Coast Campaign 1846-1848 ==
The Pacific Coast Campaign of the United States naval operations against targets along Mexico's Pacific Coast during the Mexican-American War ran from 26 December 1846 through 31 March 1848.

The main objective of the Pacific Coast Campaign was to capture the Baja California Peninsula, and block off the west coast of Mexico. Mazatlán was a main focus point, being that it was the main location for imported supplies.

== Southeastern Campaign, 1846-48 ==
=== First Battle of Tabasco ===
Commodore Matthew C. Perry led a detachment of seven vessels along the northern coast of Tabasco state. Perry arrived at the Tabasco River (now known as the Grijalva River) on October 22, 1846, and seized the town Port of Frontera along with two of their ships. Leaving a small garrison, he advanced with his troops towards the town of San Juan Bautista (Villahermosa today). Perry arrived in the city of San Juan Bautista on October 25, seizing five Mexican vessels. Colonel Juan Bautista Traconis, Tabasco Departmental commander at that time, set up barricades inside the buildings. Perry realized that the bombing of the city would be the only option to drive out the Mexican Army, and to avoid damage to the merchants of the city, withdrew its forces preparing them for the next day.

On the morning of October 26, as Perry's fleet prepared to start the attack on the city, the Mexican forces began firing at the American fleet. The U.S. bombing began to yield the square, so that the fire continued until evening. Before taking the square, Perry decided to leave and return to the port of Frontera, where he established a naval blockade to prevent supplies of food and military supplies from reaching the state capital.

=== Second Battle of Tabasco ===
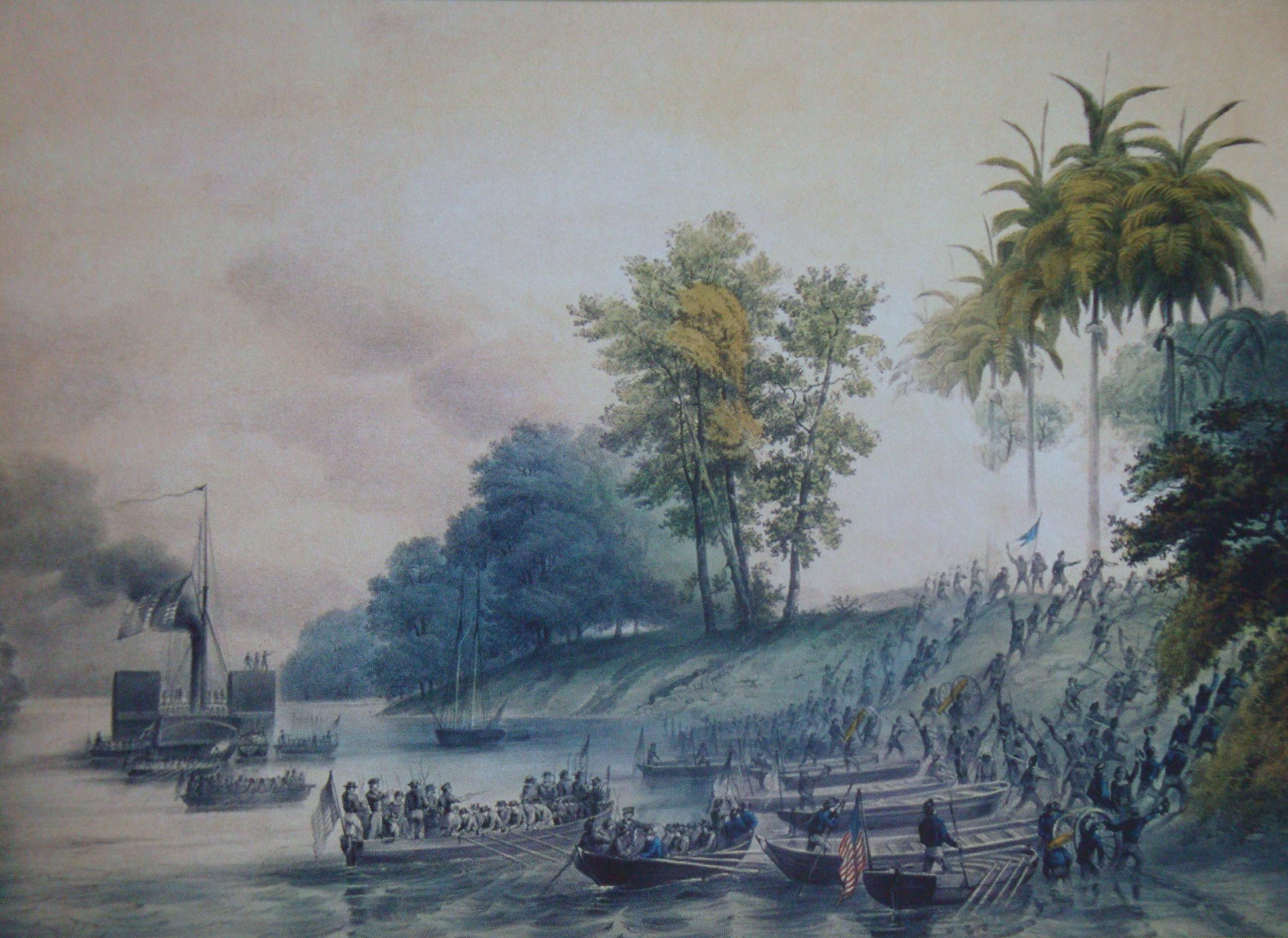
Second Battle of Tabasco

On June 13, 1847, Commodore Perry assembled the Mosquito Fleet and began moving towards the Grijalva River, towing 47 boats that carried a landing force of 1,173. On June 15, 12 miles (19 km) below San Juan Bautista, the fleet ran through an ambush with little difficulty. Again at an "S" curve in the river known as the "Devil's Bend", Perry encountered Mexican fire from a river fortification known as the Colmena redoubt, but the fleet's heavy naval guns quickly dispersed the Mexican force.

On June 16, Perry arrived at San Juan Bautista and commenced bombing the city. The attack included two ships that sailed past the fort and began shelling it from the rear. David D. Porter led 60 sailors ashore and seized the fort, raising the American flag over the works. Perry and the landing force arrived and took control of the city around 14:00.

== Mexico City Campaign ==
=== Veracruz, March 9–29, 1847 ===
Scott's army, numbering 13,660 men, rendezvoused at Lobos Island late in February 1847 and, on March 2, sailed for Veracruz, convoyed by a naval force under Commodore Matthew C. Perry. Landing operations near Veracruz began on March 9. The landing would be done all in one trip, thanks to a new design of surfboats that allowed Quartermasters to land on shorelines more efficiently and swiftly. This first major amphibious landing by the U.S. Army was unopposed, the Mexican commandant general, Juan Morales, having decided to keep his force of only 4,300 men behind the city's walls. In order to save lives, Scott chose to take Veracruz by siege rather than by assault. The city capitulated on March 27, 1847, after undergoing a demoralizing and deadly bombardment. The Americans lost 19 killed and 63 wounded. The Mexican military suffered only about 80 casualties

=== Cerro Gordo, April 17, 1847 ===
Scott began his advance toward Mexico City on April 8, 1847. The first resistance encountered was near the hamlet of Cerro Gordo where Santa Anna had strongly entrenched an army of about 12,000 men in mountain passes through which the road ran to Jalapa. Scott quickly won the battle with a flanking movement that cut off the enemy escape route, and the Mexicans surrendered in droves. From 1,000 to 1,200 casualties were suffered by the Mexicans, and Scott eventually released on parole the 3,000 who had been taken, prisoners. Santa Anna and the remnants of his army fled into the mountains. American losses were 64 killed and 353 wounded. Scott quickly pushed on to Jalapa, but was forced to wait there for supplies and reinforcements. After some weeks, he advanced cautiously to Pueblo. Wounds and sickness put 3,200 men in the hospital, and the departure for home of about 3,700 volunteers (seven regiments) whose enlistments had expired left Scott with only 5,820 effective enlisted men at the end of May 1847. Scott stayed at Puebla until the beginning of August, awaiting reinforcement and the outcome of peace negotiations which were being conducted by Nicholas P. Trist, a State Department official who had accompanied the expedition. Scott boldly struck out for Mexico City on August 7, the negotiations having failed, abandoning his line of communications to the coast. By this time, reinforcements had brought his army to a strength of nearly 10,000 men. Santa Anna had disposed his army in and around Mexico City, strongly fortifying the many natural obstacles that lay in the way of the Americans.

=== Contreras, August 18–20, 1847 ===
Scott first encountered stiff resistance at Contreras where the Mexicans were finally put to flight after suffering an estimated 700 casualties and the loss of 800 prisoners.

=== Churubusco, August 20, 1847 ===
Santa Anna promptly made another stand on Churubusco where he suffered a disastrous defeat in which his total losses for the day—killed, wounded, and especially deserters—were probably as high as 10,000. Scott estimated the Mexican losses at 4,297 killed and wounded, and he took 2,637 prisoners. Of 8,497 Americans engaged in the almost continuous battles of Contreras and Churubusco, 131 were killed, 865 wounded, and about 40 missing. Scott proposed an armistice to discuss peace terms. Santa Anna quickly agreed; but after two weeks of fruitless negotiations, it became apparent that the Mexicans were using the armistice merely for a breathing spell. On September 6, Scott broke off discussions and prepared to assault the capital. To do so, it was necessary to take the citadel of Chapultepec, a massive stone fortress on top of a hill about a mile outside the city proper. Defending Mexico City were from 18,000 to 20,000 troops, and the Mexicans were confident of victory, since it was known that Scott had barely 8,000 men and was far from his base of supply

=== Molino del Rey, September 8, 1847 ===
On September 8, 1847, the Americans launched an assault on Molino del Rey, the most important outwork of Chapultepec. It was taken after a bloody fight, in which the Mexicans suffered an estimated 2,000 casualties and lost 700 as prisoners, while perhaps as many as 2,000 deserted. The small American force had sustained comparatively serious losses—124 killed and 582 wounded—but they doggedly continued their attack on Chapultepec, which finally fell on September 13, 1847

=== Results ===
American losses were 138 killed and 673 wounded during the siege of the Fortress of Chapultepec. Mexican losses in killed, wounded, and captured totaled about 1,800. The fall of the citadel brought Mexican resistance practically to an end. Authorities in Mexico City sent out a white flag on September 14, 1847. Santa Anna abdicated the Presidency, and the last remnant of his army, about 1,500 volunteers, was completely defeated a few days later while attempting to capture an American supply train. On February 2, 1848, the Treaty of Guadalupe Hidalgo was signed, ratified in the U.S. Senate on March 10, 1848, by the Mexican Congress in May, and, on August 1, 1848, the last American soldier departed for home.

An overview map of the American campaign, Mexican campaign, and Scott's campaign.

All the casualties among American soldiers in the Mexican–American War amounted to 1,192 killed in action, 529 died of wounds, 362 suffered accidental death, and 11,155 soldiers died from disease. Disease claimed a toll seven times greater than that of Mexican weapons. Yellow fever epidemics, La Vomito, exacted a terrible toll. In addition, diarrhea, dysentery and typhoid claimed lives amid the poor sanitation common to the army camps of this period. The casualties caused by disease in the Mexican Army have never been estimated but were probably equal or greater. Using ratio of 35% killed/total casualties, combined Mexican official reports and US estimates: Northern Campaign (Palo Alto – Buena Vista); about 1,031 Mexican killed. Valley Campaign (Cerro Gordo – Mexico City); about 2,854 Mexican killed. These figures do not include people who later died of wounds, or losses in the West.

== Bibliography ==
- Carney, Stephen A. (November 21, 2023). The Occupation of Mexico, May 1846-July 1848. The U.S. Army Campaigns of the Mexican War. United States Army Center of Military History. ISBN 978-0-16-075744-0. CMH PUB 73-3. Archived from the original on April 13, 2010.
- Morison, Samuel Eliot. "Old Bruin": Commodore Matthew C. Perry, 1794-1858: The American naval officer who helped found Liberia, Hunted Pirates in the West Indies, Practised Diplomacy With the Sultan of Turkey and the King of the Two Sicilies; Commanded the Gulf Squadron in the Mexican War, Promoted the Steam Navy and the Shell Gun, and Conducted the Naval Expedition Which Opened Japan (1967) online free to borrow pp 193–251. covers the major naval campaigns.
