= 5th Division =

5th Division may refer to:

== Infantry divisions ==
- 5th Division (Australia)
- 5th Infantry Division (Belgium)
- 5th Division (People's Republic of China)
- 5th Reserve Division (People's Republic of China)
- 5th Division (Colombia)
- Finnish 5th Division (Continuation War)
- Finnish 5th Division (Winter War)
- 5th Motorized Division (France)
- 5th North African Infantry Division, France
- 5th Division (German Empire)
- 5th Division (Reichswehr)
- 5th Jäger Division (Wehrmacht)
- 5th Luftwaffe Field Division
- 5th Parachute Division (Germany)
- 5th Bavarian Reserve Division, German Empire
- 5th Ersatz Division (German Empire)
- 5th Landwehr Division (German Empire)
- 5th Reserve Division (German Empire)
- 5th Guards Infantry Division (German Empire)
- 5th Royal Bavarian Division, German Empire
- 5th Mountain Division (Wehrmacht)
- 5th Infantry Division (Greece)
- 5th Division (Imperial Japanese Army)
- 5th (Mhow) Division, British Indian Army
- 5th Infantry Division (India)
- 5th Nasr Division, Iran
- 5th Alpine Division Pusteria, Italy
- 5th CC.NN. Division "1 Febbraio", Italy
- 5th Infantry Division Cosseria, Italy
- 5th Division (New Zealand)
- 5th Division (North Korea)
- 5th Division (Iraq)
- 5th Division (Norway), participated in the Norwegian Campaign
- 5th Infantry Division (Ottoman Empire)
- 5th Army Division (Peru)
- 5th Infantry Division (Philippines)
- 5th Infantry Division (Poland)
- 5th Kresowa Infantry Division, Poland
- 5th Rifle Division (Poland)
- 5th Infantry Division (Russian Empire)
- 5th Siberian Rifle Division
- 5th Infantry Division (South Korea)
- 5th Division (South Vietnam)
- 5th Guards Airborne Division, Soviet Union
- 5th Guards Motor Rifle Division, Soviet Union
- 5th Guards Rifle Division, Soviet Union
- 5th Rifle Division (Soviet Union)
- 5th Division (Spain)
- 5th Mechanized Division (Syria)
- 5th Infantry Division (Thailand)
- 5th Airborne Division (United Kingdom)
- 5th Infantry Division (United Kingdom)
- 5th Infantry Division (United States)
- 5th Marine Division (United States)
- 5th Infantry Division (Vietnam)
- 5th Division (Yugoslav Partisans)

== Cavalry divisions ==
- 5th Light Cavalry Division, France
- 5th Cavalry Division (German Empire)
- 2nd Indian Cavalry Division, designated 5th Cavalry Division from November 1916 to March 1918 in France in World War I
- 5th Cavalry Division (India), served from July 1918 in Palestine in World War I
- 5th Guards Cavalry Division
- 5th Cavalry Division (Russian Empire)

== Armored divisions ==
- 5th Canadian Division
- 5th Armored Division (France)
- 5th SS Panzer Division Wiking, Germany
- 5th Armored Division (United States)
- 5th Armoured Division (Syria)
- 5th Panzer Division (Bundeswehr)
- 5th Light Division, Wehrmacht
- 5th Panzer Division (Wehrmacht)
- 5th Guards Tank Division

== Artillery divisions ==
- 5th Antiaircraft Missile Division, People's Republic of China
- 5th Antiaircraft Artillery Division of Air Force, People's Republic of China
- 5th Artillery Division, People's Republic of China
- 5th Flak Division, Germany
- 5th Anti-Aircraft Artillery Division, Soviet Union
- 5th Guards Anti-Aircraft Artillery Division, Soviet Union
- 5th Anti-Aircraft Division (United Kingdom)

== Aviation divisions ==
- 5th Aviation Division, People's Republic of China
- 5th Air Division (Germany)
- 5th Air Force Division, Germany
- 5th Fighter Division, Germany
- 5th Air Division, United States

== Naval divisions ==
- 5th Carrier Division, Imperial Japanese Navy
- Carrier Division 5, United States Navy

== Non-military uses ==
- Butterfield Overland Mail 5th Division
- Division 5 (Swedish football)
- Division 5 (Swedish women's football)
- (various places in Canada)

== See also ==
- Fifth Army (disambiguation)
- 5th Group (disambiguation)
- V Corps (disambiguation)
- 5th Brigade (disambiguation)
- 5th Regiment (disambiguation)
- 5th Squadron (disambiguation)
