= 5th Regiment =

5th Regiment or 5th Infantry Regiment may refer to:

== Infantry regiments ==
- 5th Aviation Regiment (Australia), a unit of the Australian Army
- 2/5th Armoured Regiment (Australia), a unit of the Australian Army
- 5th Foot Guards (German Empire), a unit of the Imperial German Army
- 5th Infantry Regiment (Greece), a unit of the Greek Army
- 5th Archipelago Regiment, a unit of the Greek Army
- 5/42 Evzone Regiment, a unit of the Greek Army
- 5th Guards Grenadiers, a unit of the Imperial German Army
- 5th Regiment of Foot, a unit of the British Army
- 5th Dragoon Guards, a unit of the British Army
- 5th Bengal European Regiment, a unit of the British East India Company
- 5th Marine Regiment (United States), a unit of the United States Marine Corps
- 5th Infantry Regiment (United States), a unit of the United States Army
- Fifth Regiment, a unit loyal to the Spanish republic at the beginning of the Spanish Civil War

=== American Revolutionary War regiments ===
- 5th Continental Regiment
- 5th Connecticut Regiment
- 5th Maryland Regiment
- 5th Massachusetts Regiment
- 5th New York Regiment
- 5th North Carolina Regiment
- 5th Pennsylvania Regiment
- 5th South Carolina Regiment
- 5th Virginia Regiment

=== American Civil War regiments ===
- 5th Iowa Volunteer Infantry Regiment
- 5th Michigan Volunteer Infantry Regiment
- 5th Minnesota Volunteer Infantry Regiment
- 5th New York Veteran Volunteer Infantry Regiment
- 5th United States Colored Infantry Regiment
- 5th West Virginia Volunteer Infantry Regiment
- 5th Wisconsin Volunteer Infantry Regiment
- 5th Missouri Infantry Regiment (disambiguation)

== Artillery regiments ==
- 5th Medium Regiment, Royal Canadian Artillery, a unit of the Canadian Army
- 5th Regiment Royal Artillery, a unit of the United Kingdom Army
- 5th (British Columbia) Field Regiment, Royal Canadian Artillery, a unit of the Canadian Army

== Cavalry regiments ==
- 5th Cavalry Regiment, a unit of the United States Army
- 5th Lithuanian Vanguard Regiment

=== American Civil War regiments ===
- 5th Regiment Illinois Volunteer Cavalry
- 5th Regiment Iowa Volunteer Cavalry
- 5th Michigan Volunteer Cavalry Regiment
- 5th West Virginia Volunteer Cavalry Regiment

== Other regiments ==
- 5th Air Reconnaissance Regiment, a unit of Yugoslav Air Force
- 5th Royal Tank Regiment, an armoured unit of the United Kingdom Army

== See also ==
- 5th Corps (disambiguation)
- 5th Army (disambiguation)
- 5th Division (disambiguation)
- 5th Brigade (disambiguation)
- 5th Group (disambiguation)
- 5th Squadron (disambiguation)
