= Fifth Army =

Fifth Army may refer to:

== Germany ==
- 5th Army (German Empire), a World War I field Army
- 5th Army (Wehrmacht), a World War II field army
- 5th Panzer Army

== Russia/USSR ==
- 5th Army (Russian Empire)
- 5th Army (RSFSR)
- 5th Army (Soviet Union)
- 5th Air Army
- 5th Air and Air Defence Forces Army
- 5th Guards Army
- 5th Guards Combined Arms Army, Soviet Union/Russia
- 5th Guards Tank Army
- 5th Shock Army
- 5th Tank Army

== Others ==
- 5th Army (Austria-Hungary)
- Fifth Army (Bulgaria)
- Fifth Army (Nationalist China), see 88th Division (National Revolutionary Army)
- 5th Army (France)
- 5th Army (Hungary)
- 5th Army (Italy)
- Fifth Area Army, Japan
- Fifth Army (Japan)
- Fifth Army (Ottoman Empire)
- Fifth Army (United Kingdom)
- Fifth United States Army
- 5th Army (Kingdom of Yugoslavia)
- Special Frontier Force of India, during the Indo-Pakistani War of 1971

== See also ==
- List of armies by number
- V Corps (disambiguation)
- 5th Division (disambiguation)
- 5th Brigade (disambiguation)
- 5th Regiment (disambiguation)
- 5th Squadron (disambiguation)
- 5th Group (disambiguation)
- 5th (disambiguation)
