= 5th Reserve Division =

5th Reserve Division may refer to:

- 5th Reserve Division (People's Republic of China)
- 5th Reserve Division (German Empire)
- 5th Bavarian Reserve Division, German Empire

== See also ==
- 5th Division (disambiguation)
