= 5th Armoured Brigade =

5th Armoured Brigade or 5th Armored Brigade may refer to:

- 5th Armoured Brigade (People's Republic of China)
- 5th Armored Brigade (South Korea)
- 5th Guards Armoured Brigade, United Kingdom
- 5th Armored Brigade (United States)

== See also ==
- 5th Brigade (disambiguation)
- 5th Tank Brigade (disambiguation)
