= V Corps =

5th Corps, Fifth Corps, or V Corps may refer to:

== France ==
- 5th Army Corps (France)
- V Cavalry Corps (Grande Armée), a cavalry unit of the Imperial French Army during the Napoleonic Wars
- V Corps (Grande Armée), a unit of the Imperial French Army during the Napoleonic Wars

== Germany ==
=== German Empire ===
- V Cavalry Corps (German Empire), Imperial German Army
- V Corps (German Empire), Imperial German Army
- V Reserve Corps, Imperial German Army

=== Nazi Germany ===
- V Army Corps (Wehrmacht)
- 5th Air Corps, Luftwaffe, Wehrmacht
- V Flak Corps, Luftwaffe, Wehrmacht
- V SS Mountain Corps, Waffen-SS

== Soviet Union and Russia ==
=== Russian Empire ===
- 5th Army Corps (Russian Empire)
- 5th Cavalry Corps (Russian Empire)
- 5th Siberian Army Corps

=== Russian Civil War ===
- 5th Pri-Amur Corps

=== Soviet Union ===
- 5th Cavalry Corps (Soviet Union)
- 5th Guards Cavalry Corps
- 5th Guards Independent Army Corps
- 5th Guards Mechanized Corps
- 5th Guards Tank Corps
- 5th Mechanized Corps
- 5th Rifle Corps

== United Kingdom ==
- V Corps (United Kingdom)

=== Artillery Volunteer Corps ===
- 5th (Fraserburgh) Aberdeenshire Artillery Volunteer Corps
- 5th (Ardgour) Argyllshire Artillery Volunteer Corps
- 5th (Kilmarnock) Ayrshire Artillery Volunteer Corps
- 5th (Cullen) Banffshire Artillery Volunteer Corps
- 5th (Castletown) Caithness Artillery Volunteer Corps
- 5th (Laird's Iron Works) Cheshire Artillery Volunteer Corps
- 5th (Par) Cornwall Artillery Volunteer Corps
- 5th (Harrington) Cumberland Artillery Volunteer Corps
- 5th (Exeter) Devonshire Artillery Volunteer Corps
- 5th (Charmouth) Dorsetshire Artillery Volunteer Corps
- 5th (Rainton) Durham Artillery Volunteer Corps
- 5th (Kirkcaldy) Fife Artillery Volunteer Corps
- 5th (Dundee) Forfarshire Artillery Volunteer Corps
- 5th (Cowie) Kincardineshire Artillery Volunteer Corps
- 5th (2nd Northern) Lanarkshire Artillery Volunteer Corps
- 5th (Blackburn) Lancashire Artillery Volunteer Corps
- 5th (Stronsay) Orkney Artillery Volunteer Corps
- 5th (Bowling) Yorkshire (West Riding) Artillery Volunteer Corps

=== Rifle Volunteer Corps ===
- 5th (Builth) Brecknockshire Rifle Volunteer Corps
- 5th (Pwllheli) Carnarvonshire Rifle Volunteer Corps
- 5th (Llanberis) Carnarvonshire Rifle Volunteer Corps
- 5th (London Welsh) City of London Rifle Volunteer Corps
- 5th (Gwersyllt) Denbighshire Rifle Volunteer Corps
- 5th (Upper Cullompton) Devonshire Rifle Volunteer Corps
- 5th Essex (Plaistow and Victoria Docks) Rifle Volunteer Corps
- 5th (Flint) Flintshire Rifle Volunteer Corps
- 5th (Stroud) Gloucestershire Rifle Volunteer Corps
- 5th (Ventnor) Isle of Wight Rifle Volunteer Corps
- 5th (Blythswood Rifles) Lanarkshire Rifle Volunteer Corps
- 5th (1st Eastern) Lanarkshire Rifle Volunteer Corps
- 5th (Liverpool Volunteer Rifle Brigade) Lancashire Rifle Volunteer Corps
- 5th (3rd Leicester Town Rifles) Leicestershire Rifle Volunteer Corps
- 5th (Uphall) Linlithgowshire Rifle Volunteer Corps
- 5th (West Middlesex) Middlesex Rifle Volunteer Corps
- 5th (Llanidloes) Montgomeryshire Rifle Volunteer Corps
- 5th (Northampton) Northamptonshire Rifle Volunteer Corps
- 5th (East Grinstead) Sussex Rifle Volunteer Corps
- 5th (Bridlington) Yorkshire (East Riding) Rifle Volunteer Corps
- 5th (Bradford) Yorkshire West Riding Rifle Volunteer Corps

== United States ==
- V Corps (United States)
- V Amphibious Corps
- V Corps (Union Army), a unit in the American Civil War
- Fifth Army Corps (Spanish–American War), a unit of the U.S. Army

== Other countries ==
- V Army Corps (Argentina)
- 5th Army Corps (Armenia)
- 5th Army Corps (Azerbaijan)
- V Corps (Bosnia and Herzegovina)
- 5th Corps (People's Republic of China)
- V Corps (Finland)
- V Army Corps (Greece)
- V Corps (Hungary)
- V Army Corps (Italy)
- V Corps (North Korea)
- V Corps (Ottoman Empire)
- V Corps (Pakistan)
- V Corps, part of Ground Operations Command, South Korea
- 5th Assault Corps (Syria)
- 5th Corps (Syrian rebel group)
- 5th Corps (Turkey)
- 5th Corps of Air Force and Air Defense, Yugoslavia
- 5th Corps (Yugoslav Partisans)

== Other uses ==
- Fifth Corps (game), a 1980 board wargame

== See also ==
- List of military corps by number
- 5th Army (disambiguation)
- 5th Brigade (disambiguation)
- 5th Division (disambiguation)
- 5th Regiment (disambiguation)
- 5th Squadron (disambiguation)
- 5th (disambiguation)
- V (disambiguation)
