= 5th Group =

5th Group may refer to:

- 5th Group CIS, a unit of the Belgian Army
- 5th Special Forces Group (United States), a unit of the United States Army
- 5th Group (Observation), later 5th Group (Composite) and currently the 5th Operations Group of the United States Air Force.

== See also ==
- 5th Division (disambiguation)
- 5th Brigade (disambiguation)
- 5th Regiment (disambiguation)
- 5th Squadron (disambiguation)
