= 5th Panzer Division =

5th Panzer Division may refer to:

- 5th Panzer Division (Wehrmacht)
- 5th Panzer Division (Bundeswehr)
- 5th SS Panzer Division Wiking

== See also ==
- 5th Light Division, renamed the 21st Panzer Division
- 5th Division (disambiguation)
