= 72nd Field Artillery Brigade =

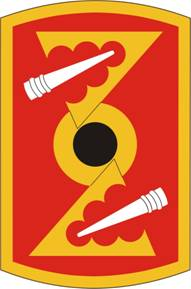
- Shoulder sleeve insignia
- Active: 1917–19; 1930–46; 1954–92; 2006–2015
- Country: United States
- Branch: Army
- Type: Field Artillery Branch
- Size: Brigade
- Garrison/HQ: Joint Base McGuire-Dix-Lakehurst
- Battle honours: World War I World War II

Commanders
- Commander: COL John Lange
- Command Sergeant Major: CSM Stephen W. Bower

Insignia
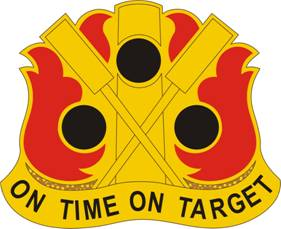
- Distinctive unit insignia

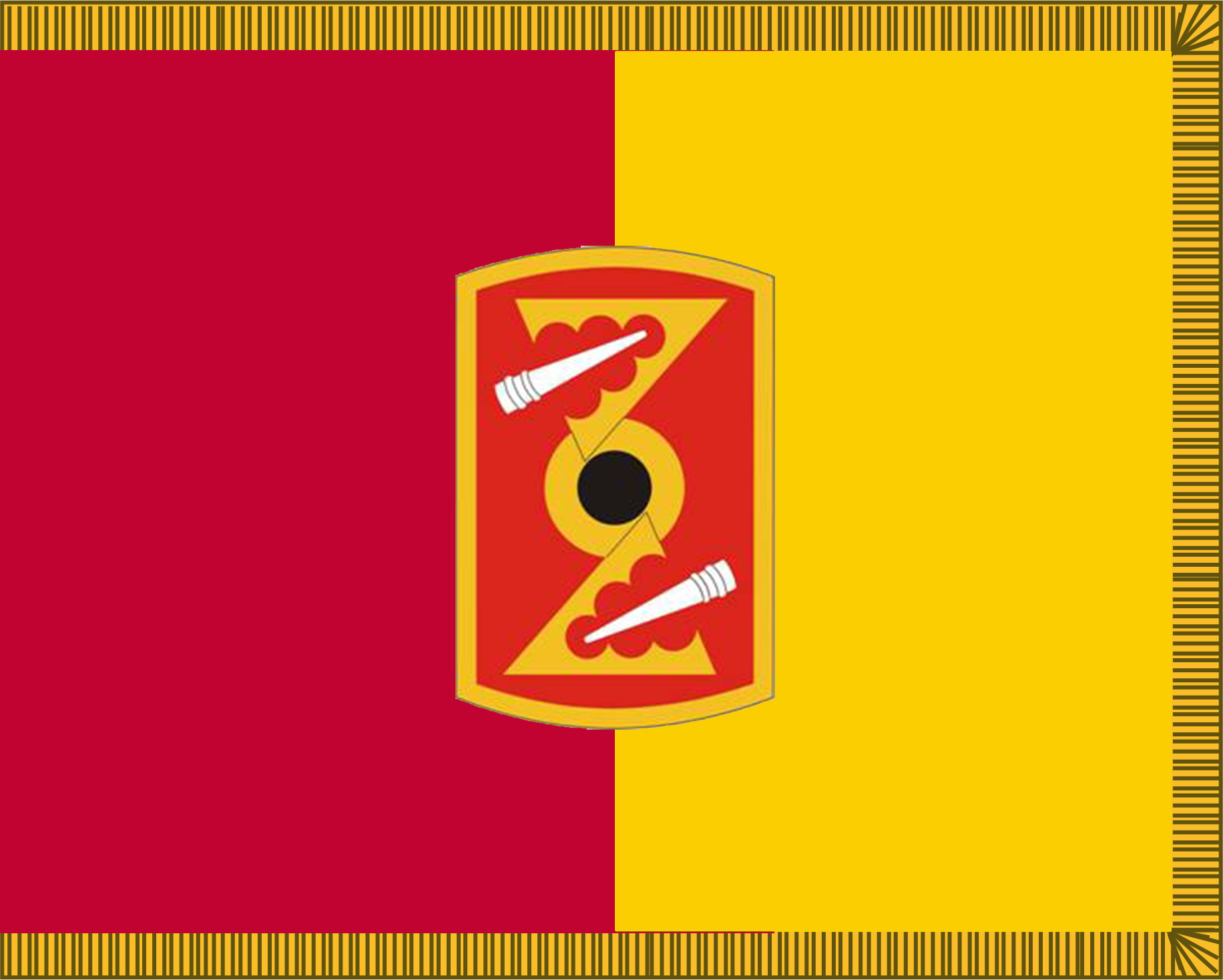
- 72nd Field Artillery Brigade Flag

The 72nd Field Artillery Brigade was an AC/RC unit based at Joint Base McGuire-Dix-Lakehurst, New Jersey. The unit is responsible for training selected United States Army Reserve and National Guard units along the East coast. The brigade was a subordinate unit of First Army Division East, First United States Army.

== History ==
=== World War I ===
The 349th Field Artillery Regiment was organized in November 1917 at Camp Dix, New Jersey, and assigned to the 92nd Division. It arrived at the port of New York on 3 March 1919 on the USS Great Northern and was demobilized on 17 March at Camp Dix.

=== Interwar period ===
==== 349th Field Artillery ====
The 349th Field Artillery Regiment was constituted in the Organized Reserve on 12 July 1929 as a 75 mm gun regiment and allotted to the Sixth Corps Area. It was designated for assignment to the 92nd Division as a "colored" unit upon the reorganization of that division. The constitution of the 349th was rescinded on 13 September 1929. It was reconstituted in the Organized Reserve on 4 September 1930, assigned to the General Headquarters Reserve, and allotted to the Eighth Corps Area. It was concurrently consolidated with the World War I-era 349th. The regiment was initiated in January 1931 with regimental HQ at El Paso, Texas, the 1st Battalion at El Paso, the 2nd Battalion at Abilene, Texas, and the 3rd Battalion at Amarillo, Texas.

The regiment conducted summer training most years with the 12th and 15th Field Artillery Regiments at Camp Bullis, Texas, and some years with the 77th Field Artillery Regiment at Fort D.A. Russell, Texas. It conducted the Citizens Military Training Camps at San Antonio, Texas in 1935 as an alternate form of summer training. All Reserve personnel were relieved on 1 August 1940, the regiment withdrawn from the Organized Reserve, and concurrently, allotted to the Regular Army and activated at Fort Sill, Oklahoma, as the Field Artillery School support regiment. It was reorganized on 15 August 1940 as 155-mm gun regiment, relieved from the Field Artillery School on 15 December, and assigned to the 18th Field Artillery Brigade.

==== 72nd Field Artillery Brigade ====
In 1940, the National Guard formed additional field artillery units, and activated six field artillery brigades (the 71st–76th). The 72nd Field Artillery Brigade was constituted in the National Guard on 18 September 1940 and allotted to Michigan. The Headquarters Battery was organized on 27 September 1940 and federally recognized at Lansing, while the Headquarters was organized on 18 October 1940 and federally recognized at Lansing. It was attached on 30 December 1940 to the Second Army, inducted into federal service on 7 April 1941, assigned to the V Corps, and moved to Fort Leonard Wood, Missouri, where it arrived on 2 June 1941.

Assigned to the brigade were the 119th, 177th, and 182nd Field Artillery Regiments. The 119th Field Artillery was a 75 mm gun regiment that had been relieved from the 32nd Division (replaced by the 126th Field Artillery Regiment, which had been converted from elements of the 105th Cavalry Regiment). The 177th Field Artillery was a 155 mm howitzer regiment that had been converted from elements of the 106th Cavalry Regiment and the Michigan portion of the 107th Quartermaster Regiment, the latter of which was subsequently reorganized in Wisconsin by converting elements of the 105th Cavalry. The 182nd Field Artillery was a 155 mm howitzer regiment.

Between June and August 1941, the brigade formed the provisional 72nd Antitank Battalion using assets from the antitank batteries and platoons of the regiments. Activated 5 August 1941, the battalion participated in the Second Army (United States) Maneuvers along with 2nd Battalion, 119th Field Artillery, as part of VII Army Corps.

=== Cold War ===
From 1 June 1958 until 15 May 1992, the brigade served as part of VII Corps Artillery in Germany.

=== Global War on Terror ===
The brigade was reactivated on 1 December 2006 by reflagging the 5th Brigade, 78th Division. As an AC/RC unit subordinate to First Army Division East, the brigade plans, coordinates, and enables post-mobilization, pre-deployment training in support of specified U.S. Army Reserve, Army National Guard, Navy, Air Force and Coast Guard units. On order, 72nd Field Artillery Brigade provides pre-mobilization training assistance within its capabilities for Army Reserve and Army National Guard units.

== Lineage and honors ==
=== Lineage ===
- Constituted 24 October 1917 in the National Army as the 349th Field Artillery and assigned to the 92d Division
- Organized 2 November 1917 at Camp Dix, New Jersey
- Demobilized 17 March 1919 at Camp Dix, New Jersey
- Reconstituted 4 September 1930 in the Organized Reserves as the 349th Field Artillery
- Withdrawn 1 August 1940 from the Organized Reserves, allotted to the Regular Army, and activated at Fort Sill, Oklahoma
- Headquarters and Headquarters Battery reorganized and redesignated 1 March 1943 as Headquarters and Headquarters Battery, 349th Field Artillery Group (remainder of regiment – hereafter separate lineages)
- Headquarters and Headquarters Battery, 349th Field Artillery Group, inactivated 26 May 1946 in Germany
- Redesignated 5 February 1947 as Headquarters and Headquarters Battery, 72d Field Artillery Group
- Activated 17 December 1954 in Germany
- Redesignated 1 June 1958 as Headquarters and Headquarters Battery, 72d Artillery Group
- Redesignated 15 March 1972 as Headquarters and Headquarters Battery, 72d Field Artillery Group
- Redesignated 1 September 1980 as Headquarters and Headquarters Battery, 72d Field Artillery Brigade
- Inactivated 15 May 1992 in Germany
- Headquarters activated 1 December 2006 at Fort George G. Meade, Maryland

=== Campaign participation credit ===
- World War I: Lorraine, 1918
- World War II: Rhineland; Central Europe

== Heraldry ==
=== Shoulder Sleeve Insignia ===
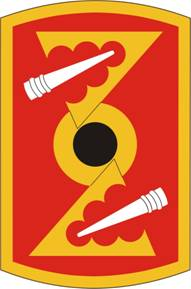

Description/Blazon: Centered on a red rectangular device arched at the top and bottom and edged with a 1/8 inch (.32 cm) yellow border, the overall dimensions 2 inches (5.08 cm) in width and 3 inches (7.62 cm) in height, a black disc within a yellow ring surmounted above and below by two yellow pheons with white shafts, the topmost pointed to upper right, the lower one pointed to lower left.

Symbolism: Scarlet and yellow are the colors associated with Field Artillery. The cannonball or black disc centered on the yellow one connotes accuracy of fire. The pheons (arrowheads) are symbolic of fire power and their configuration with the yellow disc forms an allusion to the unit's numerical designation, 72.

Background: The shoulder sleeve insignia was approved effective 16 September 1980. (TIOH Drawing Number A-1-657)

=== Distinctive unit insignia ===
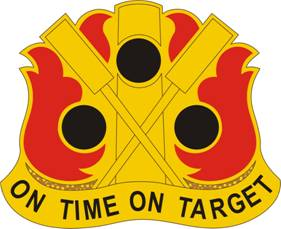

Description/Blazon: A gold color metal and enamel device 1 3/16 inches (3.02 cm) in width overall consisting of two gold ramrods in saltire between three black gunstones and red flames in front of a vertical gold cannon barrel, all above a gold scroll bearing the inscription "ON TIME ON TARGET" in black letters.

Symbolism: Scarlet is the color used for Field Artillery. The cannon and ramrods symbolize the basic mission of Field Artillery. The three gunstones and flames allude to the organization's three battle honors earned during World War I and World War II in Lorraine, Rhineland and Central Europe.

Background: The distinctive unit insignia was originally approved for the 72d Artillery Group on 16 August 1968. It was redesignated for the 72d Field Artillery Group on 7 April 1972. The insignia was redesignated effective 16 September 1980 for the 72d Field Artillery Brigade.
