= 5th Guards Brigade =

5th Guards Brigade may refer to:

- 5th Guards Infantry Brigade, German Empire
- 5th Guards Tank Brigade, Russia
- 5th Separate Guards Motor Rifle Brigade, Russia
- 5th Guards Armoured Brigade, United Kingdom

== See also ==
- 5th Brigade (disambiguation)
