= Fifth Armored =

Fifth Armored may refer to:

- 5th Armored Division (United States), active from 1941 to 1945 and from 1950 to 1956
- 5th Armored Division (France), active from 1943 to 1992
- 5th Armored Brigade (United States), based at Fort Bliss, Texas

== See also ==
- 5th Brigade
