= 5th Mounted Brigade =

5th Mounted Brigade may refer to:

- Yeomanry Mounted Brigade which was numbered 5th Mounted Brigade while attached to 2nd Mounted Division
- 1st South Midland Mounted Brigade which was renumbered as 5th Mounted Brigade on 20 April 1916

== See also ==
- 5th Brigade (disambiguation)
- 5th Cavalry (disambiguation)
