= 5th Infantry Brigade =

5th Infantry Brigade may refer to:

- 5th Canadian Infantry Brigade
- 5th Guards Infantry Brigade, German Empire
- 5th Indian Infantry Brigade
- 5th Infantry Brigade (Lebanon)
- 5th Infantry Brigade (New Zealand)
- 5th Infantry Brigade (South Africa)
- 5th Infantry Brigade (United Kingdom)

== See also ==
- 5th Brigade (disambiguation)
