= 37th Infantry Presidential Guard Battalion =

37th Infantry Battalion "Guardia Presidencial" (Presidential Guard)
- Batallón de Infantería #37 "Guardia Presidencial" (BIGUP)
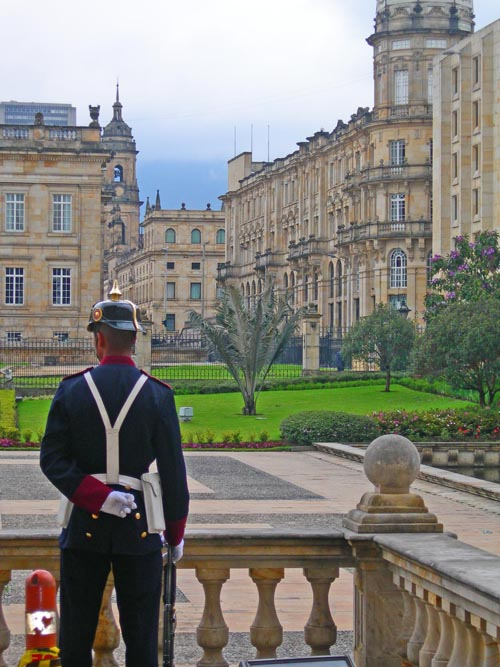
- A Soldier of the Caldas Engineers Company of the Presidential Guard.
- Active: 16 August 1928; 98 years ago
- Country: Colombia
- Branch: National Army of Colombia
- Type: Honor Guard; Infantry; Cavalry
- Role: Ceremonial Guard; Public Security
- Part of: 5th Division (Colombia)
- Garrison/HQ: Bogotá
- Nicknames: Batallón Guardia Presidencial; Nariño Palace Guard
- Motto: “En Defensa del Honor Hasta la Muerte” (“In defense of honor till death”)
- March: Himno del Batallón Guardia Presidencial (Hymn of the Presidential Guard Battalion)

Commanders
- Current commander: Lt. Col. Wilson German Hernandez Viveros

Insignia
- Shoulder Sleeve Insignia

The 37th Infantry Battalion "Guardia Presidencial" (Presidential Guard Battalion) (Spanish: Batallón de Infantería Guardia Presidencial, BIGUP) is the President of Colombia's honor guard service unit under the National Army of Colombia. It is composed of five companies, a historical company and one artillery battery plus a military band, a fanfare trumpet section and a Corps of Drums. It is stationed at the Casa de Nariño in Bogotá and carries the traditions of Simon Bolivar's infantry guards company raised in the midst of the Spanish American wars of independence in 1815.

== History ==
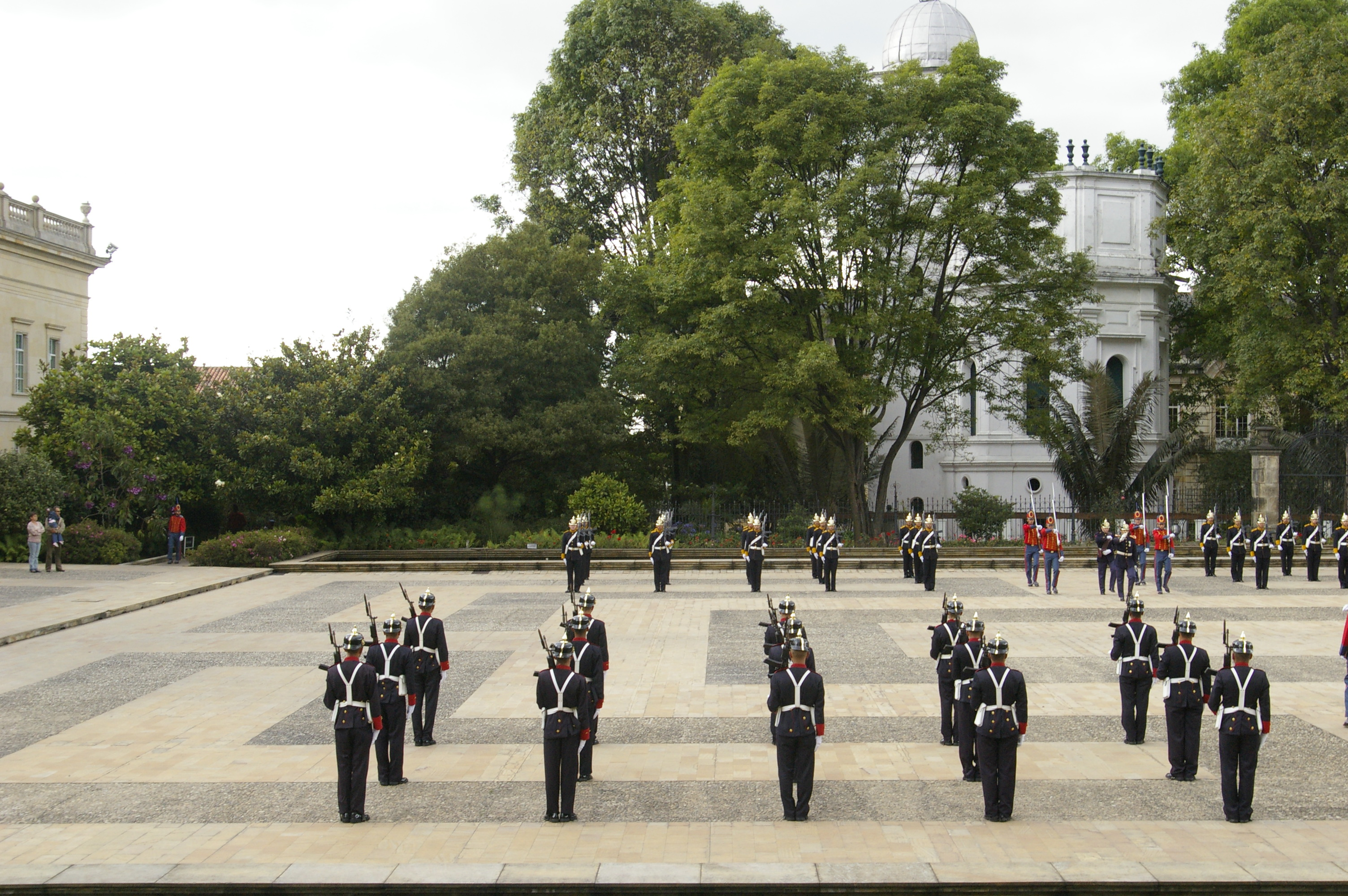
A formation of the Battalion at the entrance to the Weapons Court of the Nariño Palace

The origins of the Presidential Guard Battalion can be traced back to the honor guard of the Viceroy of New Granada during the colonial era. In 1751 then Viceroy of New Granada, José Alfonso Pizarro, ordered the creation of an honor guard for the viceroy, this guard was composed of two companies, an infantry company known as the Compañia de Infanteria de la Guardia del Virrey o Alabarderos (Infantry Company of the Viceroy’s Guard or Halberders) and a cavalry company known as the Compañía de Caballería de la Guardia del Virrey (Cavalry Company of the Viceroy’s Guard). The Viceroy’s guard had its quarters in a building diagonal to the main cathedral of Bogotá (then known as Santafé). The infantry company was dissolved in 1784 but reestablished in 1790.

=== War of Independence ===
On February 12, 1815, whilst in the city of Mompox, General Simón Bolívar acting as captain general (equivalent to the commander-in-chief of the army) of the army of New Granada, published a decree ordering the formation of the honor guard corps. This unit is what the 37th Presidential Guard Infantry Battalion traces its origins to.

According to the decree, this guard of honor would be made up of a company of Zapadores, one of Grenadiers, one of line riflemen, one of Hunters, an artillery picket and a cavalry squadron, heavily armed.

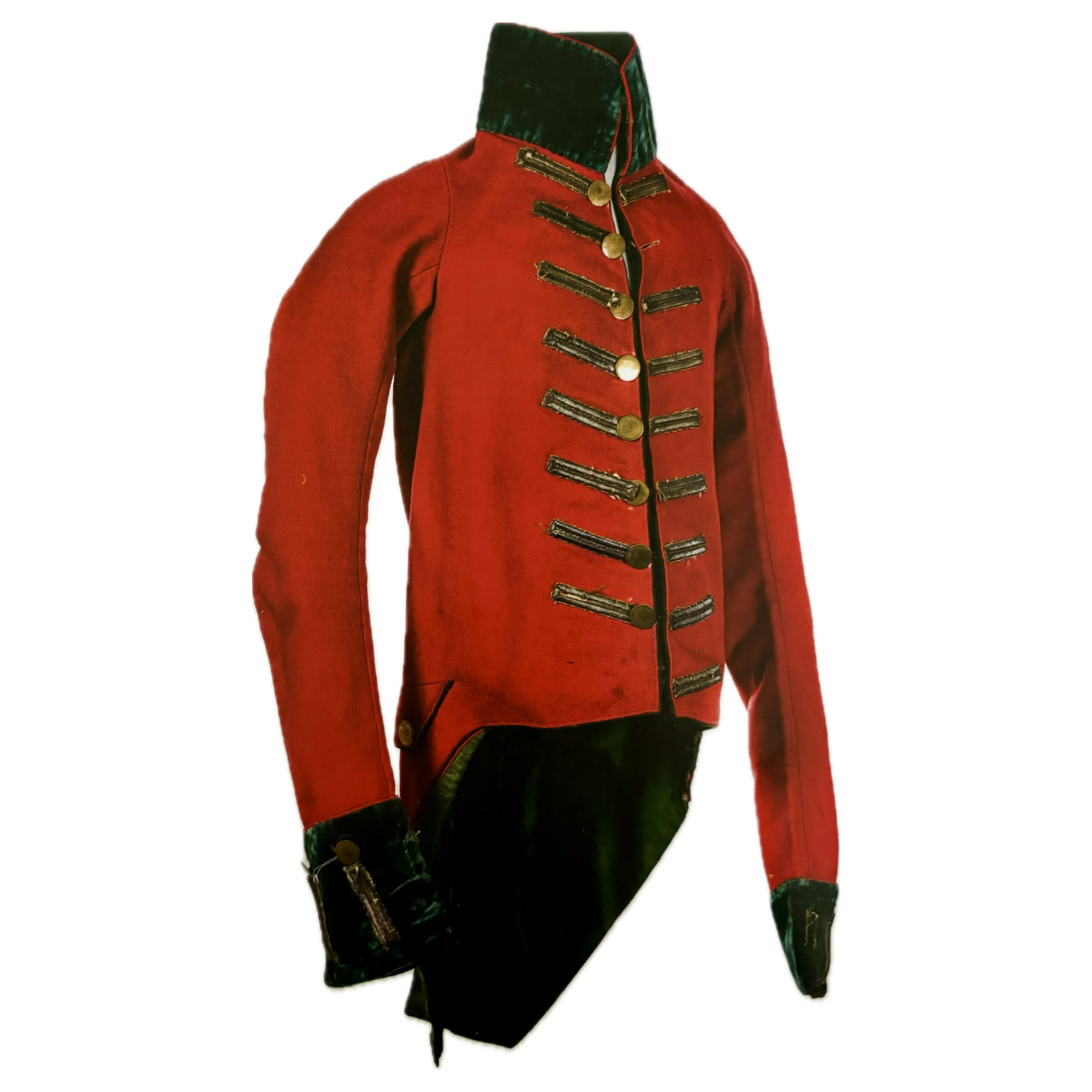
The jacket of a cadet of the Honor Guard battalion of the United Provinces of New Granada made circa 1815. Part of the collection of the Museum of Colombian Independence.

Bolivar ordered that the uniform of this unit be: red jacket, green turn-backs, collar, and cuffs with green or white pants, and black tie; the infantry will wear hunters' cap, gold caps and alamares of the same next to the flap and turns; the cavalry, hussar caps and silver capes.

The government of the United Provinces of New Granada also established a unit called the Honor Guard for the president of New Granada, its uniform was the same as the one established by Bolivar's decree. According to the chronicler José María Caballero, on July 20, 1815, the unit displayed its uniform for the first time, they wore green pants and red jackets with black bear caps. The caps had the inscription "Guard of Honor" on them.

=== Official creation ===
On December 7, 1927, President Miguel Abadía Méndez signed a decree officially founding the Presidential Guard. On August 16, 1928, the battalion was given its current name, with its first commander being Lieutenant Colonel Roberto Perea Sanclemente. Memorable actions of this battalion are remembered such as the protection given to the president during the violent acts of the Bogotazo (April 9, 1948) and during the Palace of Justice Siege on November 6, 1985. Resolution 3446 of August 17, 1955, created the medallion “Guardia Presidencial” and Decree 1880 of 1988 ruled the award merits for this prize given to the distinguished members of the battalion for their loyalty, service and good behavior.

== Functions ==
The battalion provides security to the Presidency of Colombia by meeting the requirements imposed on it by the Secretary of Security of the President of Colombia. The Fergusson Company is the chief ceremonial unit in the battalion, being in charge of providing an Honor Guard during military ceremonies such as parades, state visits, and funeral honors. On select days at the Casa de Nariño, the public can witness the flag lowering and raising ceremony in the afternoon performed by the battalion's personnel. The other 4 companies are solely responsible for the logistical security of the head of state. It reports to the 13th Brigade part of the 5th Division's and is periodically deployed in wartime and in situations of social unrest, but mostly in the security of the President of Colombia and his/her family.

=== Changing of the Guard ===
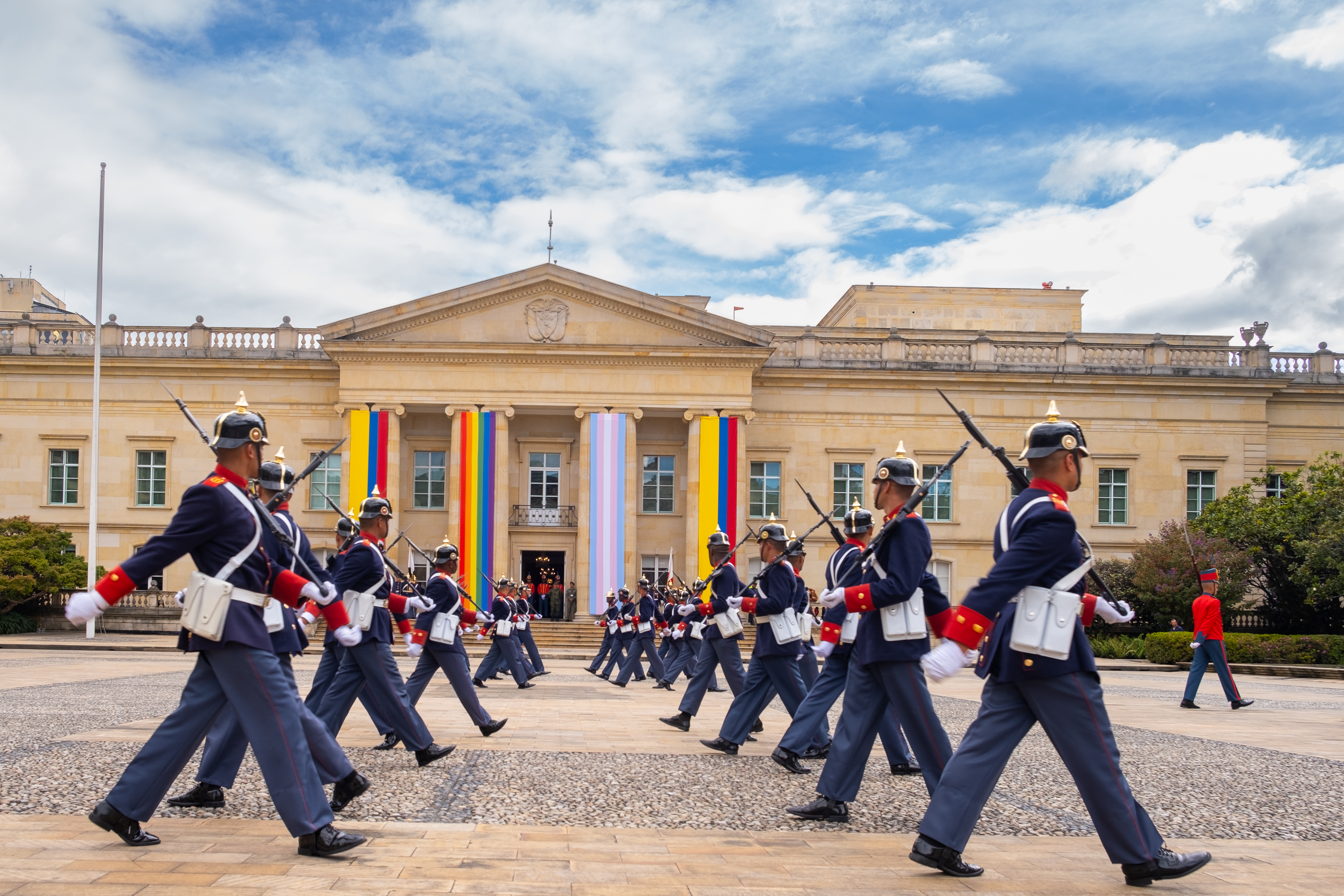
The changing of the guard ceremony

The Changing of the Guard (Cambio de guardia) is a 105 year old traditional military parade of the battalion that takes place on Wednesdays, Fridays and Sundays at 4 PM (COT) in the central square (Plaza de Armas) of the Casa de Nariño. It marks the changing of the security command at the palace. The changing of the guard involves the Fergusson Company and the battalion's military band and corps of drums.

== Composition ==
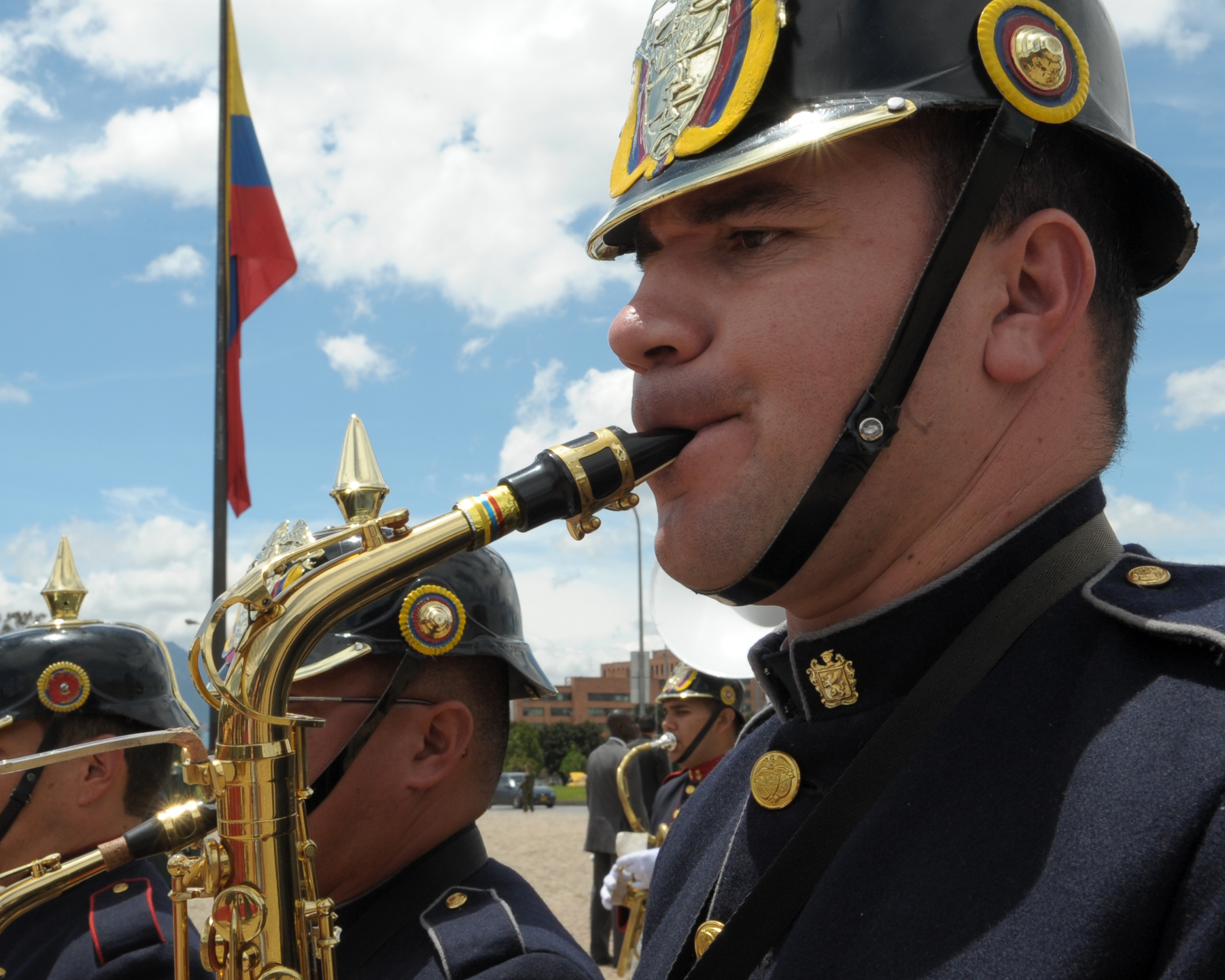
The Military band of the battalion at the Monument of Fallen Soldiers and Police in Bogotá. May 2009

The battalion is part of 13th Infantry Brigade of the Army's 5th Division, and is composed of 1,400 people: 29 officers, 116 NCOs, 1,189 soldiers and 66 civilian personnel. Today the Presidential Guard Battalion is currently subdivided into several companies:

- Battalion HHC
- Córdoba Infantry Company
- Rondon Cavalry Squadron
- Ricaurte Artillery Battery
- Caldas Engineering Company (named after Francisco José de Caldas)
- Fergusson Company
- BIGUP Battalion Presidential War Band and Corps of Drums
- Foot Guards Company of the Presidential Military Household
- Santander Training Company
- Nariño Training Company
- 3rd AFEUR Company (Special Forces)

Their headquarters are located in front of the building of the Ministry of Finance and Public Credit on the south side of the Casa de Nariño. Their motto is “En Defensa del Honor Hasta la Muerte” (“In defense of honor till death”).

=== Fergusson Company ===
Fergusson is the protocol company in charge of the weapons ceremonies (infantry). From this comes the military band, the Street of Honor (CH) and the Guard of Honor of the President (GH) that is in charge of military ceremonies: honors, parades, toilets, state visits, decorations, funeral honors and its flagship ceremony: the guard relay of the Presidential Palace. This takes place on Wednesdays, Fridays and Sundays at 3:00 p.m. at the Casa de Nariño.

=== Companies Córdoba (Infantry), Rondón (Cavalry), Ricaurte (Artillery), Caldas (Engineering) ===
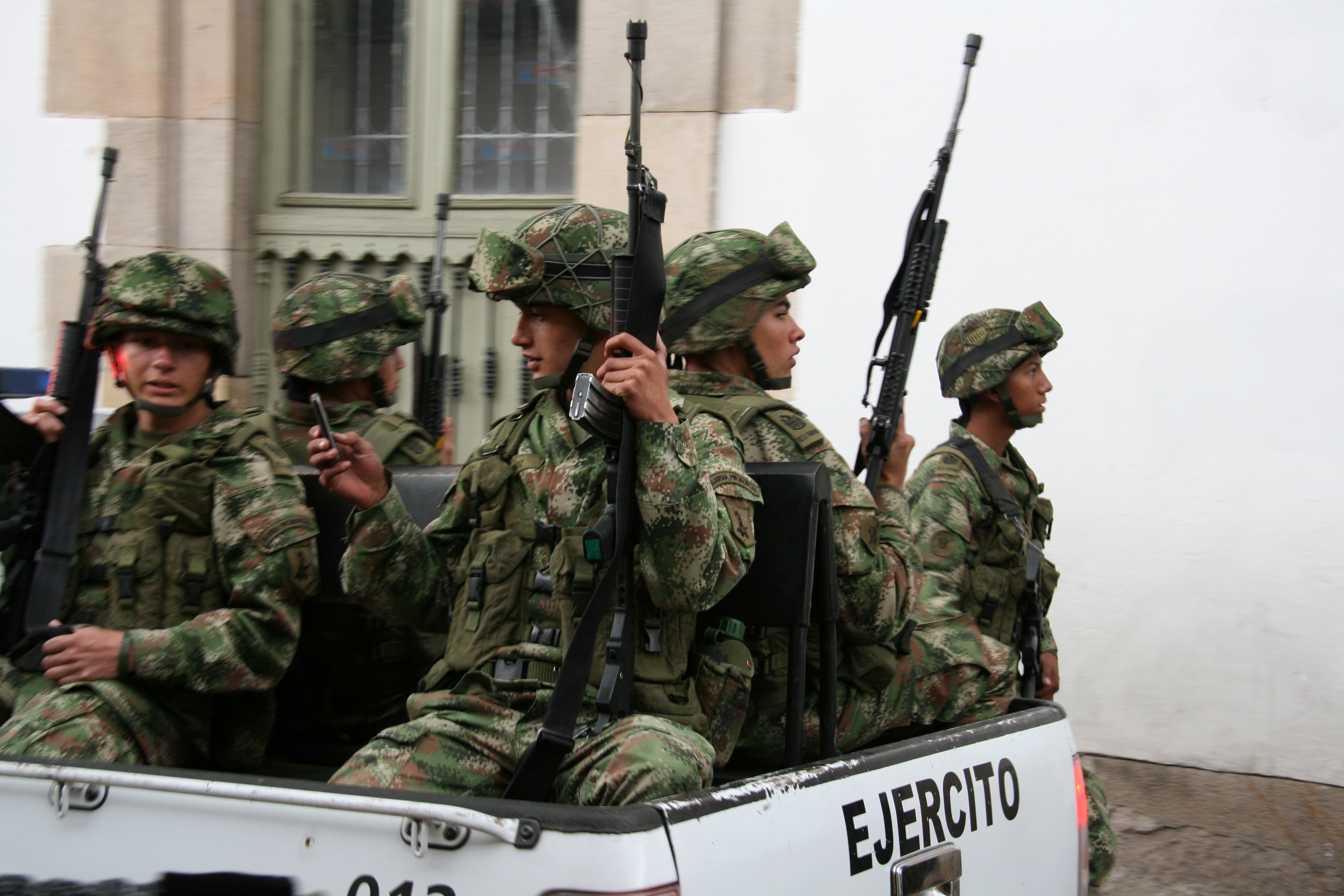
Presidential Guard on security duties in Zipaquira.

These four companies are in charge of the security of the palace, the president and his family.

== Uniform ==
The full dress uniform of the Presidential Guard Battalion, worn on ceremonial occasions and during guard duty, includes a Pickelhaube spiked helmet with the Colombian coat of arms on the front, along with a dark blue tunic with gold buttons and matching dark blue pants. The collar tabs, shoulder tabs, and cuffs are the color of the arm to which the soldier belongs. They wear white straps for their ammunition pouches as well as a white belt with a gold buckle featuring the national coat of arms. The drum major wears the same uniform, except that their tunic is white and their straps are black.

During ceremonies the troops of the presidential guard battalion carry the standard-issue service rifle of the Colombian Army.

The honor guard of the president wears early 19th-century style uniforms, that are Inspired by the uniform used by General Simón Bolívar's Honor Guard in 1824; that guard wore a red hussar jacket with yellow laces, a black Shako and green pants. The one used by the presidential guard battalion model, has their cuffs, shoulder tabs and collar in cobalt blue while still utilizing the same red hussar jacket with yellow laces, the black shako was replaced by a red and blue bicolor shako with a tricolor cockade (yellow, blue and red) and the green pants were changed to cobalt blue with red stripes. The honor guard is armed with replica 19th-century muskets with bayonets. The honor guard first used this uniform in 1969 con occasion of the 150th anniversary of the Battle of Boyacá, as a means to pay tribute to the army's actions during the war of independence.

Apart from these ceremonial uniforms, the presidential guard also wear the standard-issue service and camouflage uniforms of the Colombian Army.

== List of Commanders ==
- Lieutenant Colonel Luis Fernando Londoño Villamizar (2008 - 2013)
- Lieutenant Colonel Antonio Jose Dangond (2013 - 2015)
- Lieutenant Colonel Jose Domingo Rubio Saavedra

(1994 - 1996)

== Gallery ==
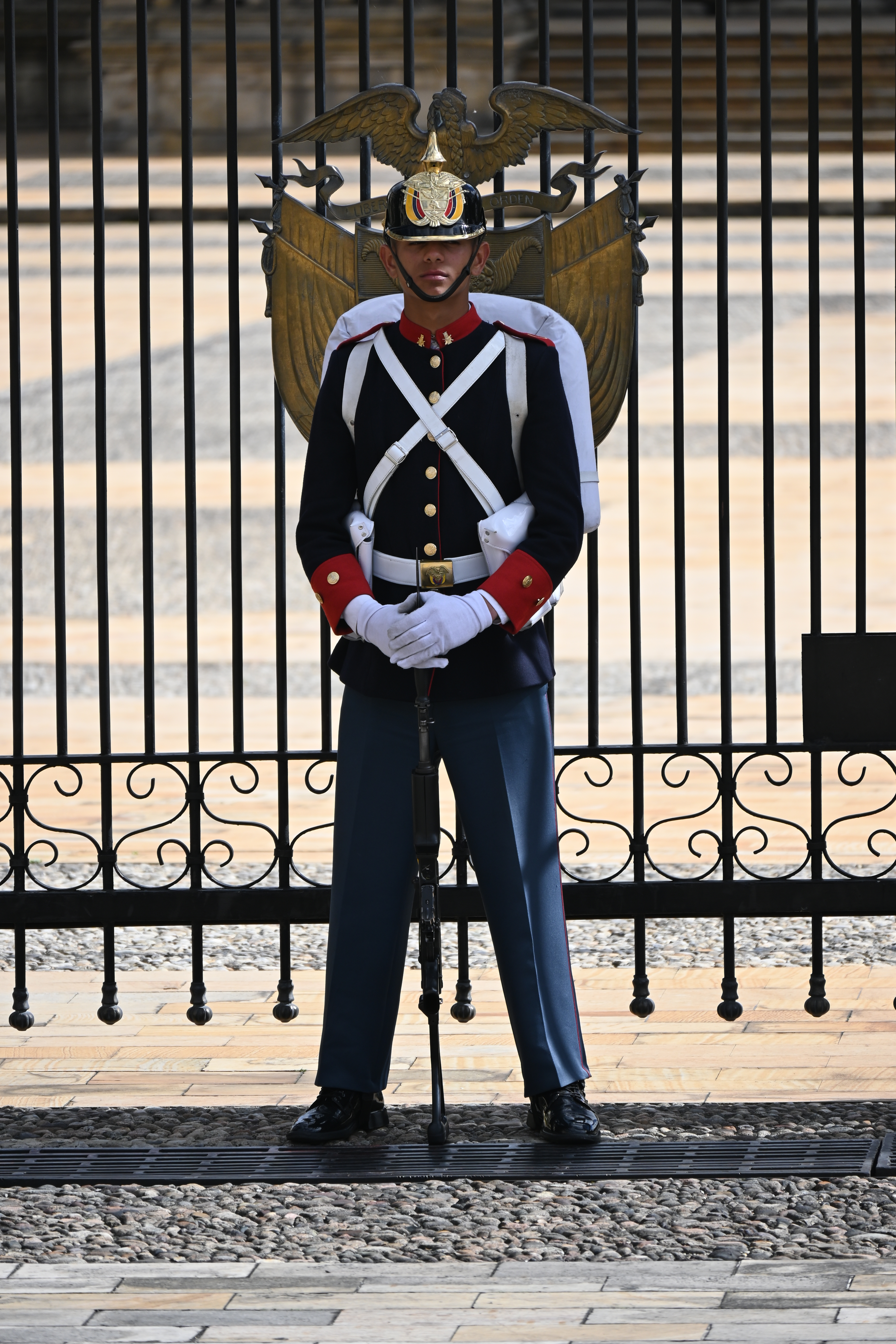
A Soldier of the Córdoba infantry company on guard duty, August 2024.

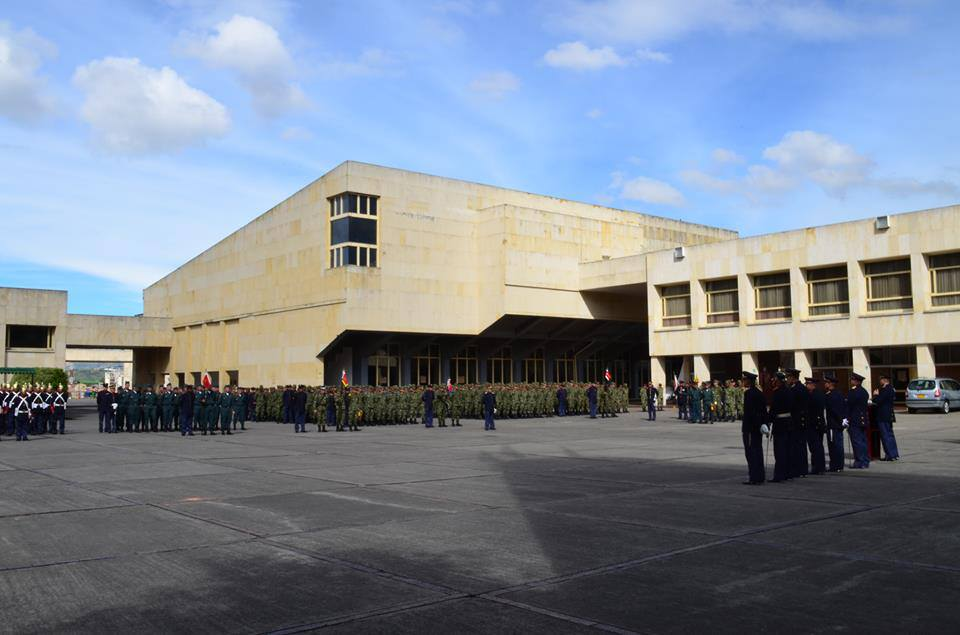
The entire assembled Fergusson Company outside of their barracks.

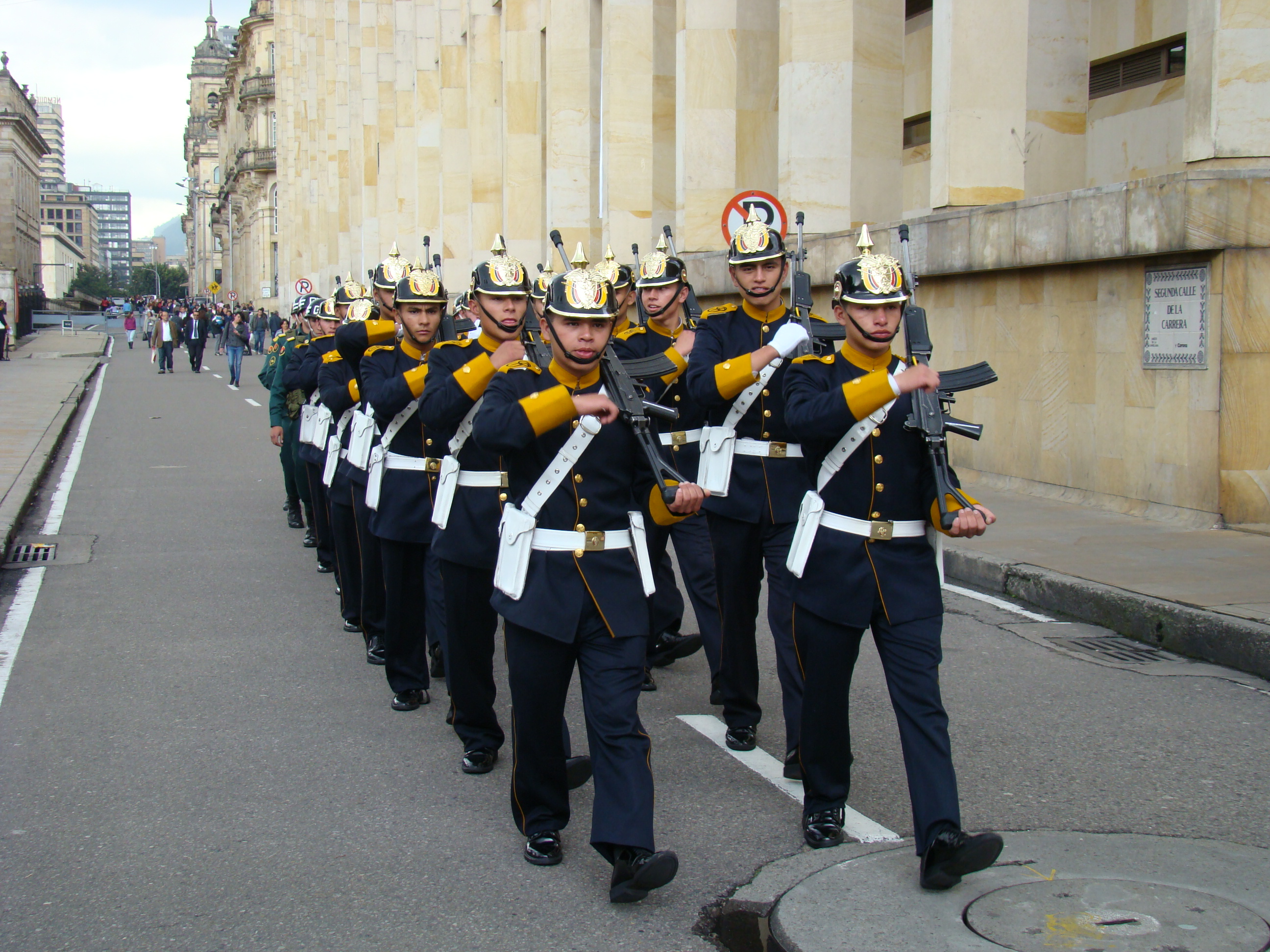
Soldiers of the Rondón Company during the changing of the guard at the Casa de Nariño.

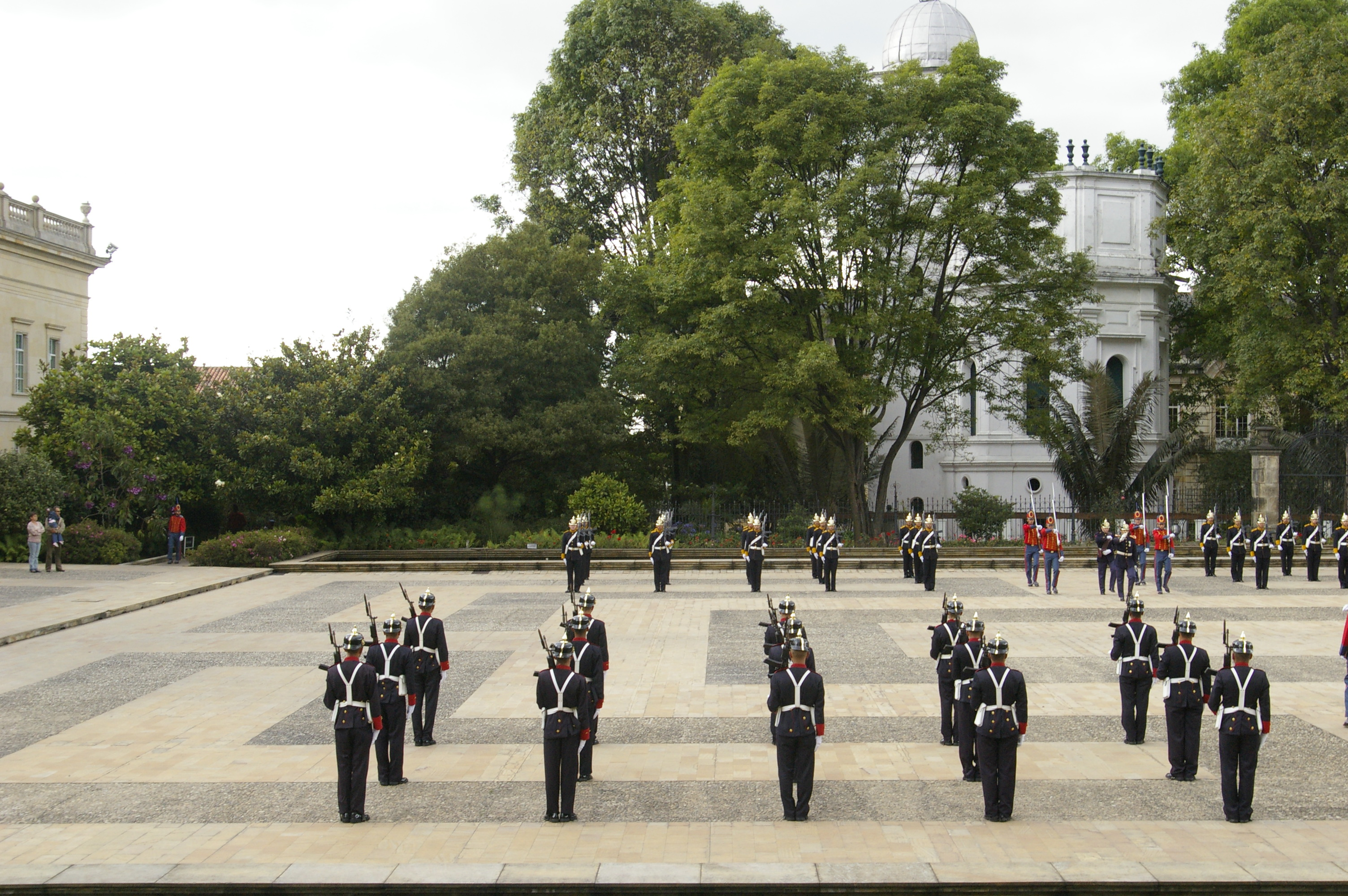
A drill unit in the forecourt of the palace.

== See also ==
- Guard of honour
- National Army of Colombia
- 5th Division (Colombia)
- Casa de Nariño

== External Media ==
- An Honours Ceremony Performed By the Battalion
- Cómo vive una ceremonia un soldado del Batallón Guardia Presidencial
