= 5th Missouri Infantry Regiment =

5th Missouri Infantry Regiment may refer to:

- 5th Missouri Infantry Regiment (Confederate), a Confederate regiment during the American Civil War
- 5th Missouri Infantry Regiment (Union, 3 months), a Union regiment that existed in 1861
- 5th Missouri Infantry Regiment (Union, 3 years), a Union regiment that existed in 1862

== See also ==
- 5th Missouri Cavalry Regiment (disambiguation)
