= 1st Air Defense Force Corps =

1st Air Defense Force Corps (1955-57)
- Chinese: 防空第1军
- Active: 1955.7-1957.7 (inactive)
- Country: (China)
- Type: Air Defense Troops
- Part of: People's Liberation Army Air Defense Force
- Garrison/HQ: Fuzhou, Fujian

The 1st Air Defense Corps (Chinese: 防空第1军) was activated on July 12, 1955, from Headquarters, 12th Public Security Division in Fuzhou, Fujian province. The corps was mainly tasked with the defense of major cities and facilities in the Fujian province when the Republic of China Air Force had held control of air superiority. The corps commander was Major General Fang Shengpu. (Note: 方升普)

In August 1958, along with the formal activation of People's Liberation Army Air Defense Force, the corps was redesignated as 1st Air Defense Force Corps (Chinese: 防空军第1军).

The corps was a part of the People's Liberation Army Air Defense Force, then a major branch of the People's Liberation Army.

The corps was composed of:

- 103rd Anti-Aircraft Artillery Division
  - 516th Anti-Aircraft Artillery Regiment
  - 542nd Anti-Aircraft Artillery Regiment
  - 522nd Anti-Aircraft Artillery Regiment
  - 402nd Anti-Aircraft Searchlight Regiment
- 105th Anti-Aircraft Artillery Division
  - 503rd Anti-Aircraft Artillery Regiment
  - 521st Anti-Aircraft Artillery Regiment
  - 527th Anti-Aircraft Artillery Regiment
  - 223rd Anti-Aircraft Radar Regiment
  - 1st Independent Anti-Aircraft Artillery Battalion of City Defense
- 225th Anti-Aircraft Intelligence Regiment
- 401st Anti-Aircraft Searchlight Regiment

From July 1, 1956, the 107th Anti-Aircraft Artillery Division was attached to the corps.

In July 1957, during the combination of the People's Liberation Army Air Force and the People's Liberation Army Air Defense Force, the corps was redesignated as 1st Air Force Corps.
