= 5th Antiaircraft Missile Division =

5th Anti-Aircraft Missile Division (1979–85) 15th Anti-Aircraft Missile Brigade (1985–93) 5th Anti-Aircraft Missile Division (1993–2017)
- Active: 1979.3.24 –
- Country: People's Republic of China
- Branch: People's Liberation Army Air Force
- Type: Division
- Role: Air defense
- Garrison/HQ: Langfang, Hebei province

The 5th Anti-Aircraft Missile Division of the Air Force (Chinese: 空军地空导弹第5师) (2nd formation) was activated on July 1, 1979, in Langfang, Beijing. The division was composed of the 16th, 26th and 27th Anti-aircraft Missile Regiments, being responsible for the anti-air defense of the southern vicinity of Beijing.

On November 5, 1985, the division was reduced to the 15th Anti-Aircraft Missile Brigade of the Air Force (Chinese: 空军地空导弹第15旅).

On December 26, 1993, the brigade was re-expanded to the 5th Anti-Aircraft Missile Division of the Air Force (Chinese: 空军地空导弹第5师).

== Composition (2010) ==
5th Anti-Aircraft Missile Division – Langfang, Hebei

- 3rd Anti-Aircraft Missile Regiment – Laishui County, Hebei
  - 51st Anti-Aircraft Missile Battalion (HQ-2) – 39°52′33.7″N 114°44′52.0″E
  - 92nd Anti-Aircraft Missile Battalion (HQ-2)
  - 93rd Anti-Aircraft Missile Battalion (HQ-2)
  - 96th Anti-Aircraft Missile Battalion (HQ-2) – 39°22′01.6″N 115°33′05.1″E
  - 97th Anti-Aircraft Missile Battalion (HQ-2) – 39°58′50.1″N 115°42′41.4″E
- 10th Anti-Aircraft Missile Regiment – Huolu, Hebei
  - 36th Anti-Aircraft Missile Battalion (HQ-7) – 37°59′50.3″N 114°55′25.6″E
  - 37th Anti-Aircraft Missile Battalion (HQ-7) – 38°17′11.2″N 114°08′54.8″E
  - 70th Anti-Aircraft Missile Battalion (HQ-7) – 38°21′46.1″N 114°40′16.1″E
  - 95th Anti-Aircraft Missile Battalion (HQ-7)
- 13th Anti-Aircraft Missile Regiment – Tongzhou District, Beijing
  - 3rd Anti-Aircraft Missile Battalion (S-300P) – 39°33′47.1″N 116°24′54.8″E
  - 33rd Anti-Aircraft Missile Battalion (S-300P) – 39°48′24.0″N 117°02′41.2″E
  - 56th Anti-Aircraft Missile Battalion (S-300P) – 39°22′44.7″N 116°07′50.9″E
  - 81st Anti-Aircraft Missile Battalion (S-300P) – 39°34′36.4″N 116°45′38.5″E
