= Hermann von Strantz =

Prussian officer and General of Infantry

- Born: 13 February 1853; Nakel an der Netze, Kingdom of Prussia
- Died: 3 November 1936 (aged 83); Dessau, Nazi Germany
- Military career
- Allegiance: Prussia; German Empire
- Branch: Imperial German Army
- Service years: 1870–1919
- Rank: General of Infantry
- Commands: 2nd Foot Guards Regiment; 2nd Guards Infantry Brigade; 25th Division; V Corps; Armee-Abteilung Strantz; 50th (3rd Lower Silesian) Infantry Regiment
- Conflicts: Franco-Prussian War; World War I
- Awards: Pour le Mérite

Hermann Christian Wilhelm von Strantz (13 February 1853 in Nakel an der Netze – 3 November 1936 in Dessau) was a Prussian officer, and later General of Infantry during World War I. He was a recipient of Pour le Mérite.

== World War I ==
In 1914, von Strantz was commanding V Corps with headquarters in Posen. In peacetime the Corps was assigned to the VIII Army Inspectorate but on mobilisation V Corps was assigned to the 5th Army forming part of centre of the forces for the Schlieffen Plan offensive in August 1914 on the Western Front.

Armee-Abteilung Strantz (named for von Strantz while he was in command, but later renamed to Armee-Abteilung C) was formed on 18 September 1914 from the left (southern) wing of the 5th Army. It initially commanded V Corps and III Bavarian Corps, controlling half a dozen divisions. Strantz remained as commander of V Corps concurrently but was deputised in this post by a Divisional Commander.

Strantz remained as commander of the Armee-Abteilung until 2 February 1917 when he retired from active service (German: zur Disposition gestellt).

== Awards ==
- Iron Cross II Class (1870)
- Iron Cross I Class (1914)
- Pour le Mérite (22 August 1915)
- Order of the Crown
- Order of the Zähringer Lion
- Bavarian Military Merit Order
- Order of the Red Eagle
- Belgian Order of Leopold
- Order of Albert the Bear
- Legion of Honour

== Bibliography ==
- Cron, Hermann (2002). Imperial German Army 1914-18: Organisation, Structure, Orders-of-Battle [first published: 1937]. Helion & Co. ISBN 1-874622-70-1.
- Ellis, John; Cox, Michael (1993). The World War I Databook. Aurum Press Ltd. ISBN 1-85410-766-6.
- [Feldzeitung] Zwischen Maas und Mosel. Armee-Abteilung von Strantz, hrsg. vom Oberkommando der Armee-Abteilung von Strantz, Siegburg ca. 1914-1917
- Holm Kirsten, Das sowjetische Speziallager Nr. 4 Landsberg/Warthe, hrsg. von der Stiftung Gedenkstätten Buchenwald und Mittelbau-Dora, Göttingen 2005 ISBN 389244952X
- Hans Friedrich von Ehrenkrook, Genealogisches Handbuch der adeligen Häuser. Adelige Häuser A Band IV. (= Genealogisches Handbuch des Adels, Band 22 der Gesamtreihe), Glücksburg 1960.
- Hanns Möller: Die Geschichte der Ritter des Ordens „pour le merite“ im Weltkrieg 1914-1918 - Abschnitt: General der Infanterie von Strantz; Deutsches Wehrkundearchiv 2007, DW-34001-00

Military offices
Preceded by General der Infanterie Günther von Kirchbach	Commander, V Corps; 3 April 1911 – 2 February 1917	Succeeded by General der Infanterie Eduard von Below
Preceded by Formed	Commander, Armee-Abteilung Strantz; 18 September 1914 – 4 February 1917	Succeeded by General der Infanterie Max von Boehn
