= 5th Division (Colombia) =

The 5th Division (Spanish: Quinta División del Ejército Nacional de Colombia) is one of the eight main infantry divisions of the National Army of Colombia that specialized in combined arms, counterinsurgency, and jungle and mountain warfare. It based in the city of Bogotá consisting of five brigades the 1st Brigade based in Tunja, the 6th Brigade based in Ibagué, the 8th Brigade based in Neiva, the 9th Brigade based in Neiva and the 13th Brigade based in Bogotá and also the biggest Brigade in the Colombian Army.

== Units ==
=== 1st Brigade ===
- 1st Brigade HQ (Tunja)
  - 1st Mechanized Cavalry Squadron. "Gen. Plazas" (Bonza)
  - 1st Infantry Battalion "Gen. Bolivar" (Tunja)
  - 1st Mountain Infantry Battalion (El Espino)
  - 2nd Infantry Battalion "Gen. Sucre" (Chiqinquirá)
  - 1st Brigade Training Battalion (Samacá)
  - 1st Artillery Battalion "tarqui" (Sogamoso)
  - 6th Infantry Protection Battalion (Miraflores)
  - 1st Combat Service Support Battalion (Tunja)
  - Gaula Group "Boyacá" (Tunja)

=== 6th Brigade ===
- 6th Brigade HQ (Ibagué)
  - 6th Counterinsurgency Battalion (Ibagué)
  - 16th Infantry Battalion (Honda)
  - 17th Infantry Battalion (Chaparral)
  - 17th Infantry Battalion (Ibagué)
  - 31st Counterinsurgency Battalion (Rovira)
  - 34th Counterinsurgency Battalion (Natagaima)
  - 6th Brigade Training Battalion Battalion (Piedras)
  - 6th Combat Service Support Battalion (Ibagué)
  - Gaula Group "Tolima" (Ibagué)

=== 8th Mobile Brigade ===
- 8th Mobile Brigade HQ (Neiva)
  - 66th Counterinsurgency Battalion (Ibagué)
  - 67th Counterinsurgency Battalion (Honda)
  - 68th Counterinsurgency Battalion (Chaparral)
  - 69th Counterinsurgency Battalion (Ibagué)
  - 30th Combat Service Support Battalion (Ibagué)

=== 9th Brigade ===
- 9th Brigade HQ (Neiva)
  - 9th Counterinsurgency Battalion
  - 26th Infantry Battalion (Garzón)
  - 27th Infantry Battalion (Pitalito)
  - 28th Counterinsurgency Battalion
  - 9th Brigade Training Battalion (la Pradera)
  - 9th Artillery Battalion (Neiva)
  - 9th Combat Service Support Battalion (Neiva)
  - Gaula Group "Huila" (Neiva)

=== 13th Brigade ===
- 13th Brigade HQ (Bogotá)
  - 10th Cavalry Squadron (Bogotá)
  - 13th Mechanized Cavalry Squadron (Bogotá)
  - 13th Counterinsurgency Battalion
  - 28th Aeromobile Infantry Battalion "Colombia" (Tolemaida)
  - 37th Infantry Battalion "Presidential Guard" (Bogotá)
  - 38th Infantry Battalion (Bogotá)
  - 39th Infantry Battalion (Fusagasugá)
  - 13th Brigade Training Battalion (La Australia)
  - 13th Military Police Battalion (Bogotá)
  - 15th Military Police Battalion (Bogotá)
  - 13th Field Artillery Battalion (Bogotá)
  - 13th Engineer Battalion (Ubala)
  - 13th Combat Service Support Battalion (Bogotá)
  - 13th (Transport) Security Battalion (Bogotá)
  - Gaula Group "Cundinamarca" (Bogotá)
