= Rovira, Tolima =

Coordinates: 4°15′N 75°20′W

Rovira
- Municipality and town
- Flag Coat of arms

- Location of the municipality and town of Rovira in the Tolima Department of Colombia.
- Country: Colombia
- Department: Tolima Department

Government
  - mayor: David Yoani Vivas Barragan

Area
  - Total: 818 km^{2} (316 sq mi)
- Elevation: 949 m (3,114 ft)

Population (2017)
  - Total: 20,452
- Time zone: UTC-5 (Colombia Standard Time)

Rovira is a town and municipality in the Tolima department of Colombia. The population of the municipality was 21,822 as of the 1993 census.

== Climate ==
Climate data for Rovira (Riomanso), elevation 2,020 m (6,630 ft), (1981–2010)
Month	Jan	Feb	Mar	Apr	May	Jun	Jul	Aug	Sep	Oct	Nov	Dec	Year
Mean daily maximum °C (°F)	21.1 (70.0)	21.1 (70.0)	21.3 (70.3)	21.7 (71.1)	21.7 (71.1)	21.6 (70.9)	21.6 (70.9)	22.1 (71.8)	22.1 (71.8)	21.7 (71.1)	21.3 (70.3)	21.4 (70.5)	21.6 (70.9)
Daily mean °C (°F)	16.7 (62.1)	16.9 (62.4)	17.0 (62.6)	17.2 (63.0)	17.2 (63.0)	17.0 (62.6)	16.8 (62.2)	17.1 (62.8)	17.2 (63.0)	17.0 (62.6)	16.8 (62.2)	16.8 (62.2)	17.0 (62.6)
Mean daily minimum °C (°F)	12.3 (54.1)	12.6 (54.7)	12.8 (55.0)	13.0 (55.4)	12.9 (55.2)	12.6 (54.7)	12.2 (54.0)	12.3 (54.1)	12.6 (54.7)	12.6 (54.7)	12.5 (54.5)	12.1 (53.8)	12.5 (54.5)
Average precipitation mm (inches)	97.2 (3.83)	125.1 (4.93)	165.7 (6.52)	215.1 (8.47)	213.2 (8.39)	146.9 (5.78)	115.6 (4.55)	107.1 (4.22)	151.9 (5.98)	185.7 (7.31)	179.6 (7.07)	125.1 (4.93)	1,822.2 (71.74)
Average precipitation days	12	13	17	19	20	16	14	13	15	19	18	15	192
Average relative humidity (%)	89	89	90	90	89	88	87	87	86	88	90	89	88
Source: Instituto de Hidrologia Meteorologia y Estudios Ambientales
