= 5th Division (People's Republic of China) =

5th Army division (1968–85) Garrison Brigade of Lanzhou Military Region (1985–1992) 1st Independent Infantry Regiment of Xinjiang Military District（1992-）
- Active: 1968.1 - Present
- Country: People's Republic of China
- Branch: People's Liberation Army
- Type: Division
- Role: Infantry
- Size: Infantry
- Part of: Xinjiang Military District
- Engagements: Sino-Vietnamese War

The 5th Army Division（Chinese: 陆军第5师） formed in December 1967 by Jinan Military Region. Soon after its formation, in May 1968, the division was transferred to Urumqi, Xinjiang.

By then the division was composed of:

- 13th Infantry Regiment;
- 14th Infantry Regiment;
- 15th Infantry Regiment;
- 312th Artillery Regiment (renamed as Artillery Regiment, 5th Army Division from December 1969).

On August 20, 1980, the Central Military Commission posthumously awarded He Changfu(Chinese: 贺昌富), assistant squad leader from 1st Squad, 6th Company, 14th Infantry Regiment the honorary title of "model of loving the people".

In December 1985, the 5th Army Division was reduced and renamed as Garrison Brigade of Lanzhou Military Region（Chinese: 兰州军区守备旅）.

From September 1985 to October 1986, the brigade's Reconnaissance Company temporarily attached to 5th Reconnaissance Group and took part in combat reconnaissance missions in Laoshan area.

In September 1992 the brigade was further reduced to 1st Independent Infantry Regiment of Xinjiang Military District（Chinese: 新疆军区独立步兵第1团）.

== Hierarchical Superiors ==
- Liu Zhizhong, a former deputy commander of the Eastern Xinjiang Military District.
- Guo Xing, a former military commander in Northern Xinjiang Military District, who is the prototype of the famous character "Li Xiangyang" in the movie Plain Guerrilla.
