= 5th Guards Infantry Division =

5th Guards Infantry Division (5. Garde-Infanterie-Division)
- Active: 1917-1919
- Country: Germany
- Branch: Army
- Type: Infantry
- Size: Approx. 15,000
- Engagements: World War I: Second Battle of the Aisne, Cambrai, German spring offensive, Hundred Days Offensive

The 5th Guards Infantry Division (5. Garde-Infanterie-Division) was a division of the Royal Prussian Guards of the Imperial German Army. It was formed during World War I and dissolved with the demobilization of the German Army in 1919.

== Formation and organization ==
The 5.Garde-Infanterie-Division was formed on January 1, 1917, and began organizing itself over the next two months. It received the headquarters of the 2nd Guards Infantry Brigade (2. Garde-Infanterie-Brigade) along with the 3rd Foot Guards (3.Garde-Regiment zu Fuß) from the 1.Garde-Infanterie-Division, the 3rd Guards Grenadiers (Garde-Grenadier-Regiment Nr. 3) from the 2nd Guards Infantry Division, and the 20th Infantry Regiment (Infanterie-Regiment Graf Tauentzien von Wittenberg (3. Brandenburgisches) Nr. 20) from the 212th Infantry Division. For artillery, a field artillery brigade headquarters was formed, but converted in February 1917 to a Guards Artillery Commander (Garde-Artillerie-Kommandeur Nr. 5). The 4th Guards Field Artillery (Garde-Feldartillerie-Regiment Nr. 4) was transferred to the division from the 2nd Guards Infantry Division. An engineer battalion, Pionier-Bataillon Nr. 100, was formed by the Garde-Pionier-Bataillon. The 5th Guards Infantry Division's Order of Battle on June 5, 1917, was as follows:

- 2nd Guards Infantry Brigade
  - 3.Garde-Regiment zu Fuß
  - Garde-Grenadier-Regiment Nr.3
  - Infanterie-Regiment Graf Tauentzien von Wittenberg (3.Brandenburgisches) Nr.20
- 1.Esk./Garde-Ulanen-Regiment Nr.2
- Garde-Artillerie-Kommandeur Nr.5
  - Garde-Feldartillerie-Regiment Nr.4 (2 cannon battalions, 1 light field howitzer battalion; each battalion of 3 batteries with four guns)
- Pionier-Bataillon Nr.100
  - 4.Komp./Garde-Pionier-Bataillon
  - 1.Res.Komp./Garde-Pionier-Bataillon
  - Garde-Minenwerfer-Kompanie Nr.9
- Garde-Fernsprech-Abteilung Nr.5

== Combat chronicle ==
The division entered the line on the Western Front along the Aisne River in March 1917. In April and May, it participated in the Second Battle of the Aisne, also known as the Third Battle of Champagne. Afterwards, it returned to positional warfare along the Chemin des Dames.

The division spent the rest of 1917 in positional warfare in the trenchlines and in various smaller battles until November 1917, when it was embroiled in the tank battle in Cambrai. After the heavy fighting in late 1917, the division was transferred to the army reserve and began training as an assault division. Beginning in March 1918, it took a leading role in the German spring offensive, including the breakthrough at St.Quentin-La Fère, the fighting over the crossings of the Somme river and the Crozat canal, and the fighting around Montdidier and Noyon.

After the failure of the Spring Offensive, the division returned to the trenchlines. In May–June 1918, it fought in the battles of Soissons and Reims. Later in 1918, it participated in various defensive battles, including those against the Allied Hundred Days Offensive around the Argonne Forest.

Allied intelligence rated the division a first class division and one of the best in the German Army.

== Late-war organization ==
Given its late formation, the division underwent fewer structural changes than other divisions by late-war. The division's order of battle on April 27, 1918, was as follows:

- Stab/2.Garde-Inf.Brig.
  - 3.Garde-Regiment zu Fuß
  - Garde-Grenadier-Regiment Nr.3
  - Infanterie-Regiment Graf Tauentzien von Wittenberg (3.Brandenburgisches) Nr.20
  - Maschinengewehr-Scharfschützen-Abteilung Nr.75
- 1.Esk./Garde-Ulanen-Regiment Nr.2
- Garde-Artillerie-Kommandeur Nr.5
  - Garde-Feldartillerie-Regiment Nr.4
  - I.Batl./Garde-Res.Fußart.Regt.1
- Pionier-Bataillon Nr.100
  - 4.Komp./Garde-Pionier-Bataillon
  - 1.Res.Komp./Garde-Pionier-Bataillon
  - Garde-Minenwerfer-Kompanie Nr.9 (dissolved in September 1918 and divided among the infantry regiments of the division)
- Garde-Div.Nachr.Kdr.5.
