= 5th Lithuanian Vanguard Regiment =

18th-century Lithuanian cavalry regiment

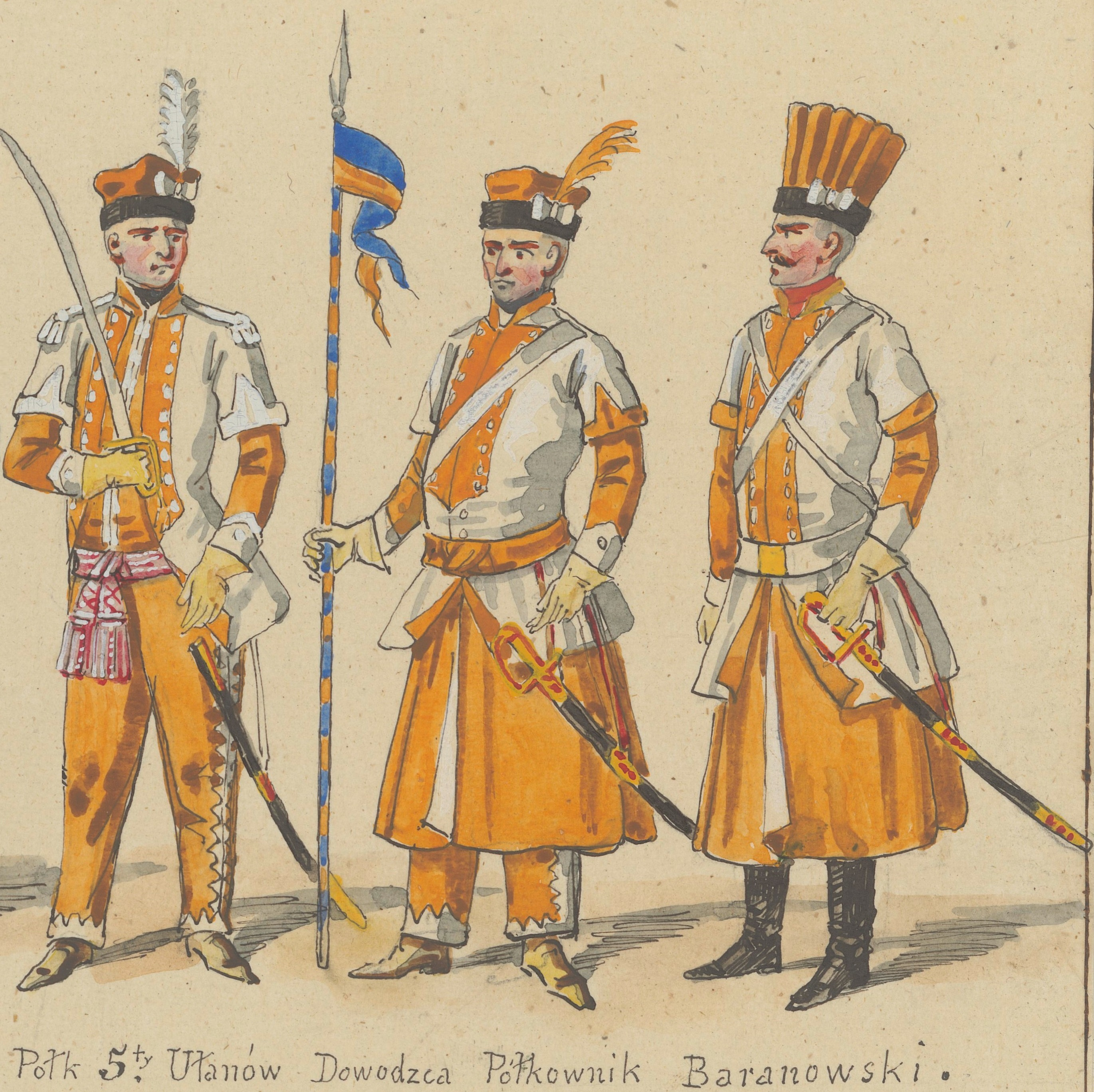
- Officer, Retainer and Companion of the regiment in 1775
- Active: 1733-1795
- Country: Grand Duchy of Lithuania (1733-1738); Electorate of Saxony (1739-1763); Grand Duchy of Lithuania (1764-1795)
- Type: Cavalry
- Garrison/HQ: Suchowola (1772-1789), Krynki (1789-1792 September), Veliuona (from 1792 October)
- Engagements: Kościuszko Uprising: Battle of Praga

The 5th Lithuanian Vanguard Regiment (Polish: 5 Pułk Litewski Przedniej Straży) was a military unit of the Grand Duchy of Lithuania. The full name was 5th Lithuanian Advance Guard Regiment of Stanisław Byszewski.

== History ==
=== Origins ===
Formed in 1733 by gathering all cavalry units of Józef Potocki, the Voivode of Kiev Potocki family, mostly composed of Tatars.

=== Electorate of Saxony ===
This regiment was leased to the Saxon army during the reign of Wettin dynasty and continuously fought in the War of Polish Succession (1734-1738), War of the Austrian Succession (1740-1748) and the Seven Years' War (1756-1763).

=== Grand Duchy of Lithuania ===
In 1764, it was summoned by the Sejm of 1764 to return to Lithuania.

==== Bar Confederation ====
The regiment fought against the Wettin dynasty's supporters.

==== 1772-1792 ====
The regiment was stationed in Suchowola (1772-1789), Krynki (1789-1792 September) and Veliuona (1792 October and onwards).

War in Defence of the Constitution

The regiment fought in the war.

==== Kościuszko Uprising ====
The regiment took part in the battle of Praga.

== Uniforms ==
In 1764–89, all officers and men had white cockades, with the officers and towarzycz also having white feathers on top of the cockades. The towarzycz had green belts and sashes, while the officers had gold-laces green waistcoats.

== Commanders ==
These were the polkovniks from 1764 to 1794:

- Hallaszewicz
- Aleksander Mustafa Korycki (-1764)

These were the polkovniks from 1764 to 1794:

- Aleksander Mustafa Korycki (1764-1774)
- Ignacy Poniatowski (1774-1780)
- Jan Gorycz (1780-1787)
- gen. mjr Stanisław Byszewski (1787-)
- Ludwik Lissowski (according to Gembarzewski, he was polkovnik, according to Machynia et al. he was podpolkovnik)
