= 5th Bengal European Regiment =

Regiment of the British East India Company

The 5th Bengal European Regiment was an infantry regiment of the British East India Company, created in 1858 and disbanded in 1860.

The regiment was raised in Bengal by the East India Company in 1858, for service in the Indian Mutiny; the "European" in the name indicated that it was manned by white soldiers, not Indian sepoys. The regiment was composed of officers drawn from two Indian units which had mutinied, the 5th Bengal Native Infantry and 6th Bengal Native Infantry.

As with all other "European" units of the Company, they were placed under the command of the Crown following the end of the Mutiny in 1858. The regiment was disbanded in 1860.
