= 5th Anti-Aircraft Artillery Division =

- Active: November 1942 – September 1945
- Country: Soviet Union
- Branch: Red Army
- Type: Anti-Aircraft Artillery
- Engagements: World War II
- Decorations: Order of the Red Banner; Order of Kutuzov, 2nd class
- Battle honours: Bratislava

The 5th Anti-Aircraft Artillery Division (Russian: 5-я зенитная артиллерийская дивизия) was an anti-aircraft artillery division of the Soviet Union's Red Army during World War II.

Formed in November 1942, the division served with the 7th Guards Army for most of the war. It fought in the Battle of Kursk, the Battle of the Dnieper, and the Siege of Budapest, ending the war in the Czechoslovakia. It was disbanded within months of the end of the war, and received the Order of the Red Banner, the Order of Kutuzov, and the honorific Bratislava for its actions in the Bratislava–Brno Offensive.

== World War II ==
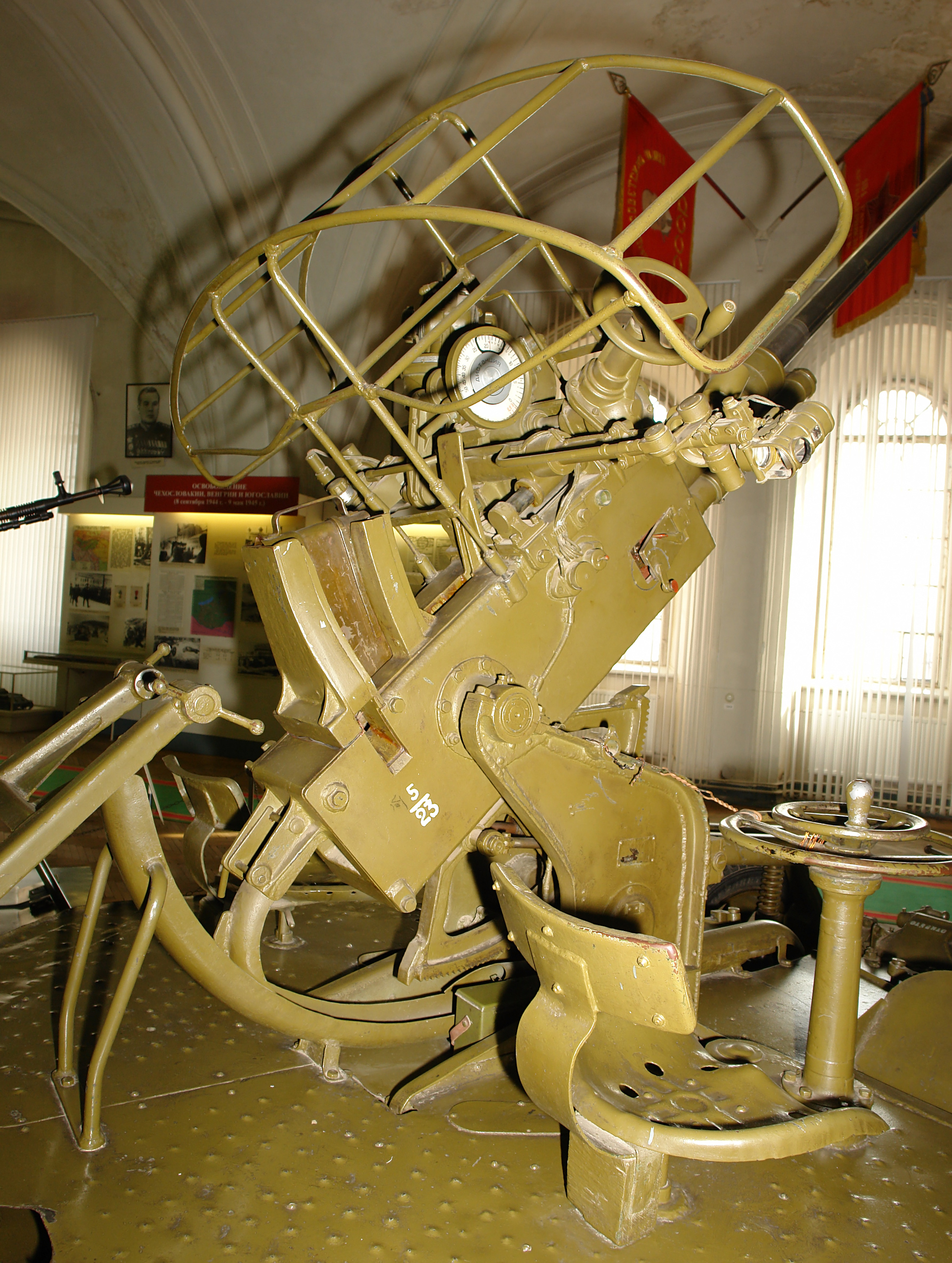
A 37 mm AA gun of the type used by the division during World War II

The 5th Anti-Aircraft Artillery Division of the Reserve of the Supreme High Command (RVGK) began forming in early November 1942 as part of the Voronezh Front under the command of Colonel Vulf Shevelev, assigned commander on 14 November. By 1 January 1943, the division included the 670th, 743rd, 1119th, and 1181st Anti-Aircraft Artillery Regiments. In March, the 670th Regiment was detached to the 21st Army. The entire division transferred to the 7th Guards Army in April; it served with the army for the rest of the war.

On 28 May, Colonel Mikhail Kudryashev was appointed division commander. Between 5 and 17 July the division covered the army's troops during the repulse of Operation Citadel, the defensive phase of the Battle of Kursk. Its 670th Regiment was credited with downing 33 German aircraft. The division transferred to the Steppe Front (redesignated the 2nd Ukrainian Front on 20 October) on 18 July. In the offensive phase of the battle in July and August, the division covered the troops of the 7th Guards Army's 24th and 25th Guards Rifle Corps during their advance towards Belgorod, the Belgorod-Kharkov Offensive. It was credited with downing fifteen German aircraft near Belgorod, and in ground combat destroyed a Tiger and four medium tanks. The division covered the crossing of the Donets and fought in the capture of Kharkov on the night of 23 August. In the capture of the latter city, 670th Regiment commander Major Pyotr Kandaurov was killed leading his unit against German tanks on the Moskovsky Prospekt, and posthumously made a Hero of the Soviet Union.

In the advance into Left-bank Ukraine, the division covered the 25th Guards Rifle Corps. It took part in the capture of Krasnohrad. Reaching the Dnieper southeast of Kremenchug, the 5th covered the crossing of the river and the capture and expansion of a bridgehead at Borodaivka on the right bank. 1181st Regiment commander Major Grigory Dernovsky, battery commander Senior Lieutenant Alexander Mikhailov, firing platoon commander Junior Lieutenant Pavel Morozov, and gun commander Senior Sergeant Alexander Zubarev received the title Hero of the Soviet Union for their actions in the fighting for the bridgehead. Morozov received the award posthumously. The 5th covered the corps during the Kirovograd Offensive in the fall, at Novoukrainka, Pervomaisk, Balta, Rîbnița, Bălți, and Botoșani during the spring Uman–Botoșani offensive, and Hârlău in the First Jassy–Kishinev offensive. Between November 1943 and July 1944, the division was credited with downing 151 enemy aircraft, destroying thirteen tanks and self-propelled guns, four halftracks, and ten pillboxes.

The division fought in the Jassy–Kishinev Offensive in August and was awarded the Order of the Red Banner on 15 September for "exemplary fulfillment of command tasks", capturing Roman, Bacău, Bârlad, and Huși, and its "valor and courage". Colonel Viktor Okorokov took command of the division in September after it was awarded the Order of the Red Banner for its actions. The division covered the crossing of the Tisza during the Battle of Debrecen. On 20 October, Colonel Matvey Gushin took command of the division, part of the 7th Guards Army. In the Budapest Offensive, the 5th covered the troops of the army in the breakthrough of Axis defenses at Abony, the advance northeast of Budapest, the crossing of the Danube, and the encirclement of Axis troops in Budapest. The division was awarded the Order of Kutuzov, 2nd class, on 6 January 1945 in recognition of its performance in the breakthrough of the Axis defenses and the crossing of the Danube. The division then fought in the Siege of Budapest until February 1945. 743rd Regiment battery commander Senior Lieutenant Eduard Ayanyan was awarded the title Hero of the Soviet Union for his leadership of his battery in cooperation with infantry units in the Budapest street fighting. 1119th Regiment gun commander Yefreytor Vasily Chernoshein was made a Hero of the Soviet Union for helping to repulse a counterattack with direct fire from his gun on 9 January in the City Park area. The 5th fought in the Bratislava–Brno Offensive in March and April. For helping to capture Bratislava on 4 April, the division received the city's name as an honorific. The 5th ended the war in Czechoslovakia.

== Postwar ==
After the end of the war, the division was disbanded in September, still under Gushin's command.
