= 5th Missouri Cavalry Regiment =

5th Missouri Cavalry Regiment may refer to the following units in the American Civil War:

- 5th Missouri Cavalry Regiment (Union)
- 5th Missouri Cavalry Regiment (Confederate), a Confederate unit from Missouri
