= HQ-2J =

Chinese surface-to-air missile

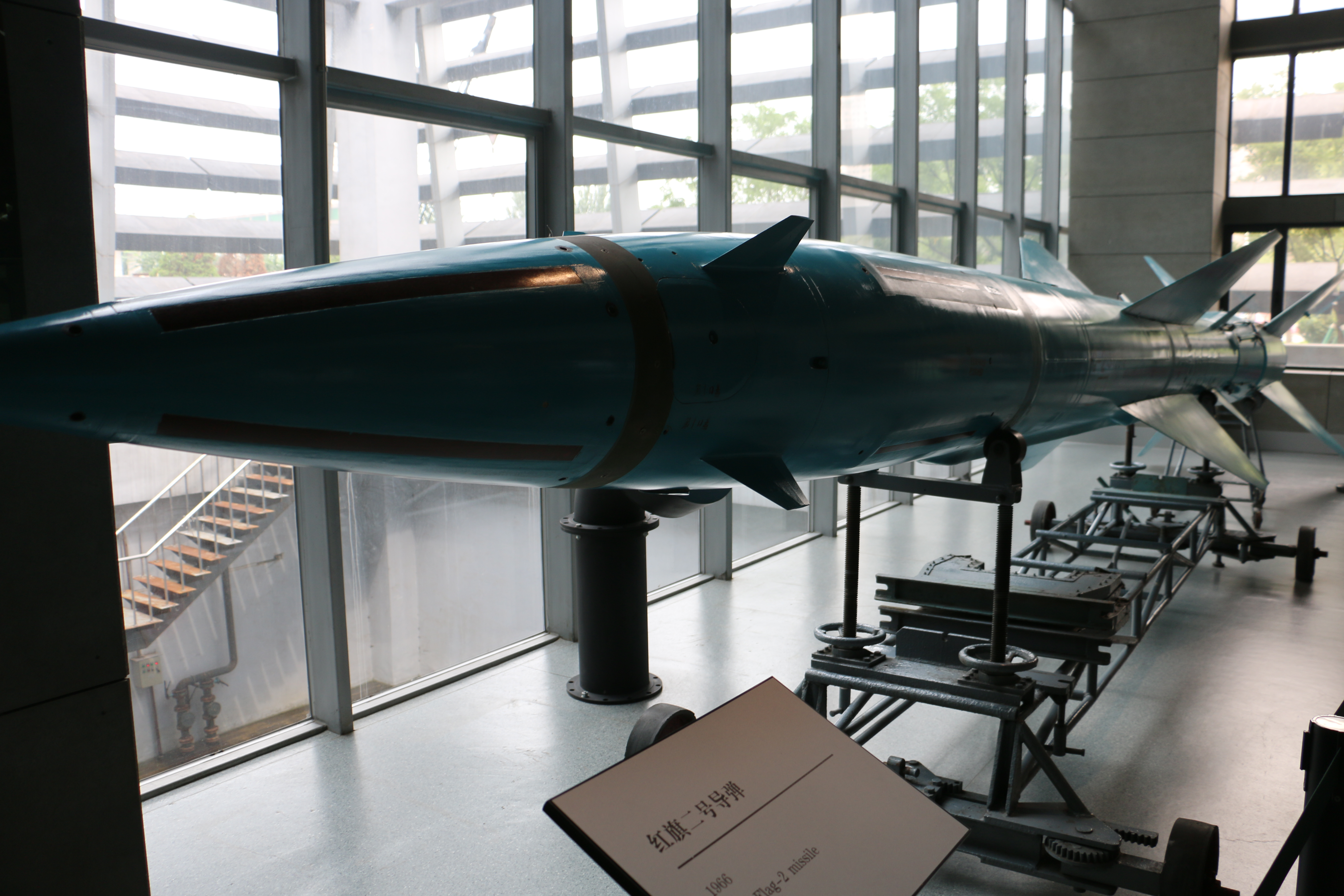
HQ-2 Missile in China Industrial Museum

HQ-2J or Hongqi-2 (红旗二号导弹) are anti-aircraft missiles mounted on the Type 77 transporter launcher. It is an upgraded version of the HQ-2 system. The HQ-1/HQ-2 are developed from the Soviet S-75 Dvina SA-2 system. The HQ-2 has been China's primary air defence system for over forty years but since 2016 it is being replaced by the HQ-22 system.

The HQ-2J was developed by China National Precision Machinery Import and Export Corporation (CPMIEC) for the PLA Army.

Iran's Sayyad-1 is a HQ-2 variant.
