= 5th Landwehr Division =

5th Landwehr Division (5. Landwehr-Division)
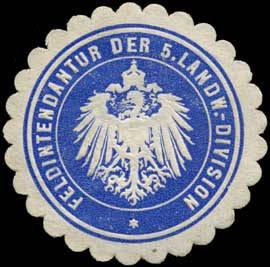
- Seal mark
- Active: October 1914 – 1919
- Country: German Empire
- Branch: Imperial German Army
- Type: Landwehr
- Size: Approx. 15,000
- Garrison/HQ: Metz
- Nickname: Waldow Division
- Engagements: World War I: Battle of Verdun; Battle of Saint-Mihiel

The 5th Landwehr Division (5. Landwehr-Division) was a unit of the Imperial German Army in World War I. The division was formed in October 1914 as the Waldow Division (Division Waldow), named after its commander. It was made up primarily of Landwehr soldiers from the garrison of Metz. It became the 5th Landwehr Division in January 1915. The division was disbanded in 1919 during the demobilization of the German Army after World War I.

== Combat chronicle ==
The Waldow Division/5th Landwehr Division served on the Western Front. It generally occupied the line between the Meuse and Moselle Rivers and around Verdun. From February to July 1916, it participated in the Battle of Verdun. In September 1918, it fought the Americans and French in the Battle of Saint-Mihiel. Allied intelligence rated the division as fourth class; it was considered primarily a sector holding division and not an offensive formation.

== Order of battle on formation ==
The Waldow Division/5th Landwehr Division was formed as a square division. The order of battle of the division on October 25, 1914, was as follows:

- 14.Landwehr-Infanterie-Brigade
  - Landwehr-Infanterie-Regiment Nr. 17
  - Landwehr-Infanterie-Regiment Nr. 36
  - Landwehr-Infanterie-Regiment Nr. 66
  - Reserve-Festungs-MG-Abteilung Nr. 1
  - Reserve-Festungs-MG-Abteilung Nr. 3
  - Festungs-MG-Abteilung Nr. 14
- 30.Landwehr-Infanterie-Brigade
  - Landwehr-Infanterie-Regiment Nr. 25
  - Landwehr-Infanterie-Regiment Nr. 65
  - Reserve-Festungs-MG-Abteilung Nr. 6
  - Festungs-MG-Trupp Nr. 10
  - Festungs-MG-Trupp Nr. 12
- 1/2 Eskadron/Reserve-Husaren-Regiment Nr. 2
- Landwehr-Fußartillerie-Bataillon Nr. 8
- Ersatz-Bataillon/Kgl. Bayerisches 2. Fußartillerie-Regiment
- 1. mobil Landwehr-Pionier-Kompanie/XVI. Armeekorps
- 1. mobil Landwehr-Pionier-Kompanie/XI. Armeekorps

== Late-war order of battle ==
The division underwent a number of organizational changes over the course of the war. It was triangularized in April 1917. A signals command was formed and combat engineer support was expanded to a full battalion. The order of battle on January 4, 1918, was as follows:

- 30.Landwehr-Infanterie-Brigade
  - Landwehr-Infanterie-Regiment Nr. 25
  - Landwehr-Infanterie-Regiment Nr. 36
  - Landwehr-Infanterie-Regiment Nr. 65
- 2.Eskadron/Ulanen-Regiment Hennigs von Treffenfeld (Altmärkisches) Nr. 16
- Landwehr-Feldartillerie-Regiment Nr. 256
- Stab Pionier-Bataillon Nr. 405
  - 1.Landwehr-Pionier-Kompanie/XI. Armeekorps
  - 1.Landwehr-Pionier-Kompanie/XVI. Armeekorps
  - Minenwerfer-Kompanie Nr. 305
- Divisions-Nachrichten-Kommandeur 505
