= 5th Antiaircraft Artillery Division of Air Force =

105th Anti-Aircraft Artillery Division of Air Defense Force (1955-57) 105th Anti-Aircraft Artillery Division of Air Force (1957-64) 5th Anti-Aircraft Artillery Division of Air Force (1964-85) 5th Composite Air Defense Brigade of Air Force (1985-93)
- Active: 1959.5.12 - 1993.12
- Country: People's Republic of China
- Branch: People's Liberation Army Air Force
- Type: Division
- Role: Air Defense
- Garrison/HQ: Baotou, Inner Mongolia

The Air Defense Department of Fujian Military District (Chinese: 福建军区防空处) was activated in July 1950. According to the order issued by the General Staff Department on March 10, 1955, the 105th Anti-Aircraft Artillery Division of Air Defense Force (Chinese: 防空军高射炮兵第105师) was activated in Fuzhou, Fujian province on April 30, 1955.

The division was then a part of the People's Liberation Army Air Defense Force. On October 13, 1955, the division was transferred under the 1st Air Defense Force Corps' control.

The division was then composed of:

- 503rd Anti-Aircraft Artillery Regiment
- 521st Anti-Aircraft Artillery Regiment
- 527th Anti-Aircraft Artillery Regiment
- 223rd Anti-Aircraft Radar Regiment
- 1st Independent Anti-Aircraft Artillery Battalion of City Defense

In June 1957, the division was transferred to the People's Liberation Army Air Force. In September, following the merge of the Air Force and the Air Defense Force, the division was formally redesignated as the 105th Anti-Aircraft Artillery Division of Air Force(Chinese: 空军高射炮兵第105师).

In July 1958, the division was transferred to the Air Force of Fuzhou Military Region's control.

On March 1, 1964, the division was redesignated as the 5th Anti-Aircraft Artillery Division of Air Force(Chinese: 空军高射炮兵第5师). The 503rd, 521st, and 527th regiments were redesignated as the 13th, 14th, and 15th Anti-Aircraft Artillery Regiments, respectively.

On December 5, 1966, the division moved to Guangxi. On May 20, 1967, the 5th Anti-Aircraft Artillery Division, along with the 1st Naval Anti-Aircraft Artillery Regiment, 3 AAA battalions from the 38th Army Corps, and the 2nd Battalion of 2nd Searchlight Regiment of Air Force, entered North Vietnam as the 35th Column of the Chinese Logistics Forces, to participate in air-defense missions in the vicinity of Lang Son and Kép. From May 1967 to January 1968, the division allegedly destroyed 139 US aircraft and damaged another 121, and captured 26 US pilots. The division suffered 42 KIA and 269 wounded.

From January 5 to 20, 1968, the division returned from North Vietnam and redeployed to Fujian. The division was then under the 8th Air Force Corps' control.

In August 1969, the division moved to Beijing and transferred to Beijing Military Region's control.

On March 31, 1970, the division moved to Zhangjiakou, Hebei province.

On April 28, 1976, the division moved to Baotou, Inner Mongolia.

In September 1985, the division combined with the 7th Surface-to-Air Missile Regiment and reorganized into the 5th Composite Air Defense Brigade of Air Force(Chinese: 空军防空混成第5旅)

In December 1993 the brigade was disbanded.
