= 5th Cavalry =

5th Cavalry, 5th Cavalry Corps, V Cavalry Corps, 5th Cavalry Division, 5th Cavalry Brigade or 5th Cavalry Regiment may refer to:

== Corps ==
- 5th Cavalry Corps (Soviet Union)
- 5th Cavalry Corps (Russian Empire)
- V Cavalry Corps (Grande Armée)
- V Cavalry Corps (German Empire)
- 5th Guards Cavalry Corps, Soviet Union

== Divisions ==
- 5th Light Cavalry Division (France)
- 5th Cavalry Division (German Empire)
- 2nd Indian Cavalry Division, which was designated the 5th Cavalry Division from November 1916 to March 1918 in France
- 5th Cavalry Division (India)
- 5th Guards Cavalry Division, of the Soviet Army
- 5th Cavalry Division (Russian Empire)

== Brigades ==
- 5th (Mhow) Cavalry Brigade, of the Indian Army
- 5th (Secunderabad) Cavalry Brigade, of the Indian Army from September 1920 to 1923
- 5th Cavalry Brigade (United Kingdom)

== Regiments ==
- 5th Cavalry (India), a former regiment of the Indian Army
- 5th Bengal Light Cavalry, a former regiment of the East India Company
- 5th Bengal European Cavalry, a former regiment of the East India Company
- 5th Cavalry Regiment (United States)
- 5th Armored Cavalry Regiment, of the United States Army
- 5th Arkansas Cavalry Regiment, a Confederate regiment of the American Civil War
- 5th Georgia Cavalry, a Confederate regiment of the American Civil War
- 5th Michigan Volunteer Cavalry Regiment, a Union regiment of the American Civil War
- 5th Mississippi Cavalry Regiment, a Confederate regiment of the American Civil War
- 5th Missouri Cavalry Regiment (Union), a Union regiment of the American Civil War
- 5th Ohio Cavalry, a Union regiment of the American Civil War
- 5th United States Colored Cavalry Regiment, a Union regiment of the American Civil War
- 5th Virginia Cavalry, a Confederate regiment of the American Civil War
