= 5th Reserve Division (People's Republic of China) =

5th Reserve Division (1955–58)
- Active: 1955.8-1958.3
- Country: People's Republic of China
- Branch: People's Liberation Army
- Type: Division
- Role: Reserve Infantry
- Part of: Chengdu Military Region
- Garrison/HQ: Nanchong, Sichuan

5th Reserve Division (Chinese: 预备第5师) was formed in August 1955 in Chengdu Military Region. On February 15, 1956, the division moved to Nanchong, Sichuan.

As of its activation the division was composed of:

- 13th Reserve Regiment;
- 14th Reserve Regiment;
- 15th Reserve Regiment;
- Artillery Regiment;
- Anti-Aircraft Artillery Regiment;
- Sergeant Training Regiment.

The division was fully manned and equipped. During its short-lived existence the division was focused on the training of officers and sergeants.

In March 1958 the division was demobilized, moving to Heilongjiang for agricultural missions.
