= 5th Armored Brigade (South Korea) =

Armored brigade of South Korea

- 제5기갑여단
- Active: 1 December 1990 – present
- Country: South Korea
- Branch: Republic of Korea Army
- Type: Armored
- Role: Mobile force
- Size: 2,000 personnel (as of 2018)
- Part of: V Corps
- Garrison/HQ: Yangju, Gyeonggi Province
- Nickname(s): 철풍 (Cheolpung / Iron Storm)
- Equipment: K1, K200 KIFV, K30 Biho

Commanders
- Current commander: Brig. Gen. Oh Seong-dae

The 5th Armored Brigade (Korean: 제5기갑여단) is a military formation of the Republic of Korea Army. The brigade is subordinated to the V Corps.

== Organization ==
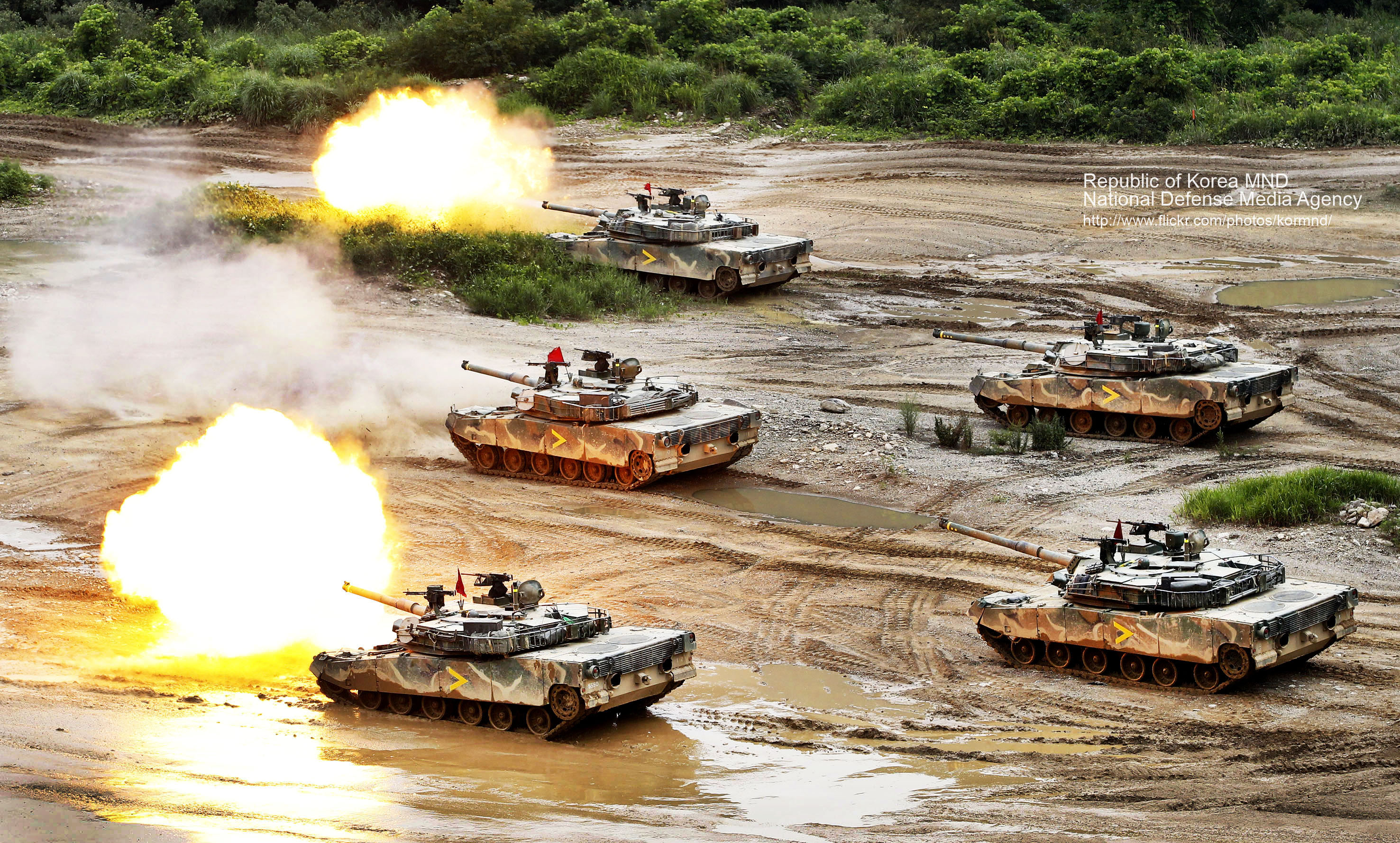
K1 tanks equipped with CPS-A1 commander's sight from the 55th tank battalion of the 5th armored brigade at the Darakdae shooting range in Yeoncheon County, Gyeonggi Province

In 2020, K1E1 tank battalions of the brigade was equipped with maneuvering and combat shooting training system.

- Headquarters:
  - Headquarters Company
  - Air Defense Artillery Battery (K30 Biho)
  - Armored Engineer Company
  - Chemical Company
  - Armored Reconnaissance Company
  - Signal Company
  - Combat Support Battalion
  - Intelligence Company
- 38th Armored Battalion (K1E1)
- 39th Armored Battalion (K1E1)
- 55th Armored Battalion (K1E1)
- 113th Mechanized Infantry Battalion (K200)
- 126th Mechanized Infantry Battalion (K200)
- 665th Artillery Battalion (K55A1)
