= 5th Brigade, 78th Division =

- Country: United States
- Branch: United States Army
- Type: Artillery
- Size: Brigade
- Garrison/HQ: Joint Base McGuire–Dix–Lakehurst

The 5th Brigade, 78th Division was an AC/RC unit based at Joint Base McGuire–Dix–Lakehurst, New Jersey. The unit was responsible for training selected United States Army Reserve and National Guard units along the East coast. The brigade was a subordinate unit of First Army Division East, First United States Army when it was inactivated in 2006.

== History ==
The 5th Brigade, 78th Division was constituted 5 August 1917, in the National Army as the 303rd Supply Train and assigned to the 78th Division. The Division organized December 1917 – May 1918 at Camp Dix, New Jersey. It consisted of three regiments – the 309th, 311th, and 312th.

In France, during the summer and fall of 1918, the 78th Division was the "point of the wedge" for the final offensive, which knocked out Germany. The 5th Brigade was in three major campaigns during World War I – Meuse-Argonne, Saint-Mihiel and Lorraine. The unit was demobilized 5 June 1919, at Camp Dix, New Jersey. The brigade was reconstituted 3 July 1936, in the Organized Reserves; concurrently consolidated with the 78th Division Quartermaster Train.

The brigade was reorganized and redesignated on 1 July 1936 as the 403rd Quartermaster Regiment, an element of the 78th Division (later redesignated as the 78th Infantry Division). On 20 February 1942, the unit was redesignated as the 403rd Quartermaster Battalion.

In World War II, the 5th Brigade, was ordered into active military service 15 August 1942, and reorganized at Camp Butner, North Carolina. After two years as part of the 78th Training Division, the 5th Brigade embarked for the European theatre. The brigade participated in three campaigns – Rhineland, Ardennes-Alsace, and Central Europe. Again, the Brigade was inactivated on 22 May 1946, in Germany. On 21 February 1947, the brigade activated at Newark, New Jersey. (Organized Reserves redesignated 25 March 1948, as the Organized Reserve Corps; redesignated 9 July 1952, as the Army Reserve). The brigade reorganized and redesignated 16 October 1978, as Headquarters, 78th Training Command, an element of the 78th Division (Training). On 17 October 1984, the brigade was inactivated at Edison, New Jersey. The brigade was redesignated 1 October 1993, as Headquarters, 5th Brigade, 78th Division (Exercise), and activated at Baltimore, Maryland.

In 2006, as part of the Army's Transformation Plan, the 5/78th was reflagged as the 72nd Field Artillery Brigade.

The unit has participated in training exercises with the 174th Infantry Brigade at Joint Base McGuire–Dix–Lakehurst, New Jersey since 2007.

== Lineage and honors ==
=== Lineage ===
- Constituted 5 August 1917 in the National Army as the 303d Supply Train and assigned to the 78th Division
- Organized in December 1917 – May 1918 at Camp Dix, New Jersey
- Demobilized 5 June 1919 at Camp Dix, New Jersey
- Reconstituted 3 July 1926 in the Organized Reserves; concurrently consolidated with the 78th Division Quartermaster Train (organized in November 1921 in the Organized Reserves as the 78th Division Train, Quartermaster Corps, with headquarters at Newark, New Jersey; redesignated 23 March 1925 as the 78th Division Quartermaster Train) and consolidated unit designated as the 78th Division Quartermaster Train
- Reorganized and redesignated 1 July 1936 as the 403d Quartermaster Regiment, an element of the 78th Division (later redesignated as the 78th Infantry Division)
- Reorganized and redesignated 20 February 1942 as the 403d Quartermaster Battalion
- Ordered into active military service 15 August 1942 and reorganized at Camp Butner, North Carolina
- Reorganized and redesignated (less Ordnance Maintenance Platoon, Headquarters Company) 27 September 1942 as the 78th Quartermaster Company, an element of the 78th Infantry Division (Ordnance Maintenance Platoon, Headquarters Company—hereafter separate lineage)
- Inactivated 22 May 1946 in Germany
- Activated 21 February 1947 at Newark, New Jersey

(Organized Reserves redesignated 25 March 1948 as the Organized Reserve Corps; redesignated 9 July 1952 as the Army Reserve)

- Inactivated 18 March 1954 at Newark, New Jersey
- Disbanded 1 May 1959
- Reconstituted 24 November 1967 in the Army Reserve as the 78th Committee Group, an element of the 78th Division (Training)
- Activated 31 January 1968 at Camp Kilmer, New Jersey
- Reorganized and redesignated 1 August 1971 as Headquarters, 78th Committee Group, an element of the 78th Division (Training)
- Reorganized and redesignated 16 October 1978 as Headquarters, 78th Training Command, an element of the 78th Division (Training)
- Inactivated 17 October 1984 at Edison, New Jersey
- Redesignated 1 October 1993 as Headquarters, 5th Brigade, 78th Division (Exercise), and activated at Baltimore, Maryland
- Reorganized and redesignated 17 October 1999 as Headquarters, 5th Brigade, 78th Division (Training Support) and allotted to the Regular Army at Fort Meade, Maryland
- Inactivated

=== Campaign participation credit ===
- World War I: St. Mihiel; Meuse-Argonne; Lorraine 1918
- World War II: Rhineland; Ardennes-Alsace; Central Europe

=== Decorations ===
- Meritorious Unit Commendation (Army) for EUROPEAN THEATER

== Organization ==
The unit is composed of:

- Headquarters & Headquarters Battery, 72nd Field Artillery Brigade (Joint Base McGuire–Dix–Lakehurst, New Jersey)
- 2d Battalion, 315th Regiment (Field Artillery) (Joint Base McGuire–Dix–Lakehurst, New Jersey)
- 3rd Battalion, 314th Regiment (Field Artillery) (Joint Base McGuire–Dix–Lakehurst, New Jersey)
- 2d Battalion, 313th Regiment (Fort Drum, New York)
- 3rd Battalion, 313th Regiment (Logistics Support Battalion)(Fort Devens, Massachusetts)
- 1st Battalion, 313th Regiment (Logistics Support Battalion) (Fort Bragg, North Carolina)
- 1st Battalion, 322nd Regiment (Logistics Support Battalion)(Fort A.P. Hill, Virginia)

Fort A.P. Hill

For further information see The Brigade, A History by John J. McGrath from the Combat Studies Institute Press, Fort Leavenworth, Kansas.
