= 5 Squadron =

5 Squadron or 5th Squadron may refer to:

Aviation squadrons:

- No. 5 Squadron RAAF, a unit of the Royal Australian Air Force
- No. 5 Squadron RCAF, a unit of the Royal Canadian Air Force
- No. 5 Squadron IAF, a unit of the Indian Air Force
- No. 5 Squadron RJAF, a unit of the Royal Jordanian Air Force
- No. 5 Squadron RNZAF, a unit of the Royal New Zealand Air Force
- No. 5 Squadron PAF, a unit of the Pakistan Air Force
- No. 5 Squadron SLAF, a unit of the Sri Lanka Air Force
- 5 Squadron SAAF, a unit of the South African Air Force
- No. 5 Squadron RAF, a unit of the United Kingdom Royal Air Force
- 5th Special Operations Squadron, a unit of the United States Air Force
- 5th Space Operations Squadron, a unit of the United States Air Force
- 5th Space Launch Squadron, a unit of the United States Air Force
- Marine Air Control Squadron 5, a unit of the United States Marine Corps
- VF-5 (Fighter Squadron 5), a unit of the United States Navy
- VP-5 (Patrol Squadron 5), a unit of the United States Navy

Naval squadrons:

- 5th Battle Squadron, a formation of the United Kingdom Royal Navy
- 5th Destroyer Squadron, a formation of the United Kingdom Royal Navy

Ground combat squadrons:

- 2/5th Commando Squadron (Australia), a unit of the Australian Army

== See also ==
- Squadron No. 5, a 1939 Soviet film
