= 5th Brigade =

5th Brigade may refer to:

== Australia ==
- 5th Light Horse Brigade
- 5th Brigade (Australia)
- 5th Motor Brigade

== Belarus ==
- 5th Spetsnaz Brigade

== British India ==
- 5th (Jhelum) Brigade
- 5th (Mhow) Cavalry Brigade
- 5th (Secunderabad) Cavalry Brigade

== Canada ==
- 5th Canadian Infantry Brigade
- 5 Canadian Mechanized Brigade Group

== China ==
- 5th Armoured Brigade (People's Republic of China)

== Croatia ==
- 5th Guards Brigade (Croatia)

== Germany ==
- 5th Guards Infantry Brigade (German Empire)

== Greece ==
- 5th Airmobile Brigade

== India ==
- 5th Indian Infantry Brigade

== Japan ==
- 5th Brigade (Japan)

== Lebanon ==
- 5th Infantry Brigade (Lebanon)

== New Zealand ==
- 5th Infantry Brigade (New Zealand)

== Poland ==
- Home Army 5th Wilno Brigade

== Russia ==
- 5th Anti-Aircraft Missile Brigade
- 5th Guards Tank Brigade
- 5th Separate Guards Motor Rifle Brigade, also known as the Oplot Brigade

== Soviet Union ==
- 5th Anti-Aircraft Missile Brigade
- 138th Separate Tank Regiment, originally the 5th Separate Tank Brigade
- 5th Spetsnaz Brigade

== South Africa ==
- 5th Infantry Brigade (South Africa)

== South Korea ==
- 5th Armored Brigade (South Korea)

== Ukraine ==
- 5th Assault Brigade (Ukraine)
- 5th Heavy Mechanized Brigade
- 5th Mechanized Brigade (Ukraine)
- 5th Slobozhanska Brigade

== United Kingdom ==
- 5th Anti-Aircraft Brigade (United Kingdom)
- 5th Cavalry Brigade (United Kingdom)
- 5th Infantry Brigade (United Kingdom)
- 5th Guards Armoured Brigade
- 5th Mounted Brigade (disambiguation)
- 5th Parachute Brigade (United Kingdom)
- 5th Provisional Brigade
- 5th Reserve Brigade
- 5th Searchlight Brigade

=== Artillery units ===
- 5th Brigade Royal Field Artillery
- 5th Brigade, North Irish Division, Royal Artillery
- 5th Brigade, South Irish Division, Royal Artillery
- 5th Brigade, Scottish Division, Royal Artillery
- 5th Brigade, Welsh Division, Royal Artillery
- 5th County of London Brigade, Royal Field Artillery
- 5th (Highland) Medium Brigade, Royal Garrison Artillery
- V Brigade, Royal Horse Artillery

== United States ==
- 5th Armored Brigade (United States)
- 5th Marine Expeditionary Brigade
- 5th Medical Brigade
- 5th Reserve Officers' Training Corps Brigade
- 5th Security Force Assistance Brigade
- 5th Brigade, 78th Division
- 5th Stryker Combat Brigade, 2nd Infantry Division

== Yugoslavia ==
- 5th Krajina (Kozara) Assault Brigade

== Zimbabwe ==
- 5th Brigade (Zimbabwe)

== See also ==
- 5th Division (disambiguation)
- 5th Regiment (disambiguation)
