= 5th Battalion =

5th Battalion may refer to:

== Australia ==
- 5th Battalion (Australia)
- 5th Machine Gun Battalion
- 5th Pioneer Battalion
- 5th Battalion, Royal Australian Regiment
- 2/5th Battalion
- 5th/6th Battalion, Royal Victoria Regiment
- 5th/7th Battalion, Royal Australian Regiment

== Canada ==
- 5th Battalion, Canadian Mounted Rifles, CEF
- 5th Battalion (Western Cavalry), CEF

== (British) India ==
- 5th Assam Police Commando Battalion, Pabhoi
- 5th Battalion, 4th Gorkha Rifles
- 5th Battalion, 11th Gorkha Rifles
- 5th Battalion Bombay Sepoys (disambiguation)
- 5th Battalion Coast Sepoys

== Italy ==
- 5th Engineer Battalion "Bolsena"
- 5th Maneuver Logistic Battalion "Euganeo"
- 5th Motorized Infantry Battalion "Col della Beretta"
- 5th Paratroopers Battalion "El Alamein"
- 5th Signal Battalion "Rolle"
- 5th Tank Battalion "M.O. Chiamenti"
- V Cyclists Battalion

== Ukraine ==
- 5th Battalion Tactical Group
- 5th Nuclear Power Plant Protection Battalion
- 5th Territorial Defence Battalion 'Prykarpattya'

== United Kingdom ==
- 5th Battalion, Cameronians (Scottish Rifles)
- 5th Battalion, Durham Light Infantry
- 5th Battalion, East Yorkshire Regiment (TA)
- 5th Battalion, Gloucestershire Regiment
- 5th Battalion, King's Own Yorkshire Light Infantry
- 5th Battalion, King's Regiment (Liverpool)
- 5th Battalion, The Light Infantry
- 5th Battalion, Lincolnshire Regiment
- 5th Battalion, Loyal North Lancashire Regiment
- 5th Battalion, Manchester Regiment
- 5th Battalion, North Staffordshire Regiment
- 5th Battalion, The Rifles
- 5th Battalion, Royal Northumberland Fusiliers
- 5th Battalion, Royal Regiment of Scotland
- 5th Battalion, Royal Sussex Regiment
- 5th Battalion, Royal Warwickshire Regiment
- 5th Battalion, South Lancashire Regiment
- 5th Battalion, Ulster Defence Regiment
- 5th Battalion, York and Lancaster Regiment
- 5th (1st Derbyshire Militia) Battalion, Sherwood Foresters
- 5th (1st Warwickshire Militia) Battalion, Royal Warwickshire Regiment
- 5th (6th Royal Lancashire Militia) Battalion, Manchester Regiment
- 5th (7th Royal Lancashire Militia) Battalion, Lancashire Fusiliers
- 5th (City of London) Battalion, London Regiment (London Rifle Brigade)
- 5th (Cyclist) Battalion, East Yorkshire Regiment
- 5th (Donegal Militia) Battalion, Royal Inniskilling Fusiliers
- 5th (Flintshire) Battalion, Royal Welch Fusiliers
- 5th (Glasgow Highland) Volunteer Battalion, Highland Light Infantry
- 5th (Hackney) Battalion, Royal Berkshire Regiment
- 5th (Huntingdon Militia) Battalion, King's Royal Rifle Corps
- 5th (Huntingdonshire) Battalion, Northamptonshire Regiment
- 5th (Irish) Volunteer Battalion, King's (Liverpool Regiment)
- 5th (North Irish Horse) Corps Cyclist Battalion
- 5th (Perthshire Highland) Volunteer Battalion, Black Watch (Royal Highlanders)
- 5th (Prince of Wales's) Battalion, Devonshire Regiment
- 5th (Queen's Edinburgh Rifles) Battalion, Royal Scots
- 5th (Royal Elthorne Militia) Battalion, Middlesex Regiment
- 5th (Royal Meath Militia) Battalion, Prince of Wales's Leinster Regiment (Royal Canadians)
- 5th (Royal South Middlesex Militia) Battalion, Royal Fusiliers
- 5th (Royal Westminster Militia) Battalion, Royal Fusiliers
- 5th (Scottish) Parachute Battalion
- 5th (Worcestershire Militia) Battalion, Worcestershire Regiment
- 5th Administrative Battalion, Middlesex Rifle Volunteer Corps
- 5th Administrative Battalion, Yorkshire West Riding Rifle Volunteer Corps
- 5th Line Battalion, King's German Legion
- 5th Training Reserve Battalion
- 5th Volunteer Battalion, Royal Scots
- 5th Volunteer Battalion, South Wales Borderers
- 3rd/5th Battalion Lancashire Fusiliers
- 4th/5th (Cinque Ports) Battalion, Royal Sussex Regiment
- 5th/8th Battalion, King's Regiment

== United States ==
=== Confederate States Army ===
- 5th Louisiana Infantry Battalion
- 5th Virginia Infantry Battalion

=== Union Army ===
- 5th District of Columbia Infantry Battalion

=== United States Army ===
- 5th Battalion, 7th Air Defense Artillery Regiment
- 5th Battalion, 52nd Air Defense Artillery Regiment
- 5th Battalion, 101st Aviation Regiment
- 5th Battalion, 158th Aviation Regiment
- 5th Battalion, 206th Field Artillery Regiment
- 5th Battalion, 20th Infantry Regiment
- 5th Ranger Battalion

=== United States Marine Corps ===
- 5th Battalion, 10th Marines
- 5th Battalion, 11th Marines
- 5th Battalion, 14th Marines
- 5th Antiaircraft Artillery Battalion
- 5th Light Antiaircraft Missile Battalion

== Other countries ==
- 5th Marine Battalion (Argentina)
- 5th Mechanized Infantry Battalion, Colombia
- 5th Single Infantry Battalion, Estonia
- 5th Lithuanian Construction Battalion, Nazi Germany
- 5th Battalion, Ghana Regiment
- 5th Infantry Battalion (Ireland)
- 5th Battalion, King's African Rifles, Kenya
- 5th/7th Battalion, Royal New Zealand Infantry Regiment
- 5th (1st Silesian) Jäger Battalion "von Neumann", Prussia
- 5th Malabon Battalion, Philippine Republican Army
- 5th Battalion of the 14th Central Bosnian Brigade, an anti-Nazi resistance unit, part of the Yugoslavian National Liberation Army
- 5th Vietnamese Parachute Battalion

== See also ==
- 5th Army (disambiguation)
- V Corps (disambiguation)
- 5th Division (disambiguation)
- 5th Brigade (disambiguation)
- 5th Regiment (disambiguation)
- 5th Group (disambiguation)
- 5th Squadron (disambiguation)
- 5th (disambiguation)
