= 1st Division (Colombia) =

Colombian National Army division

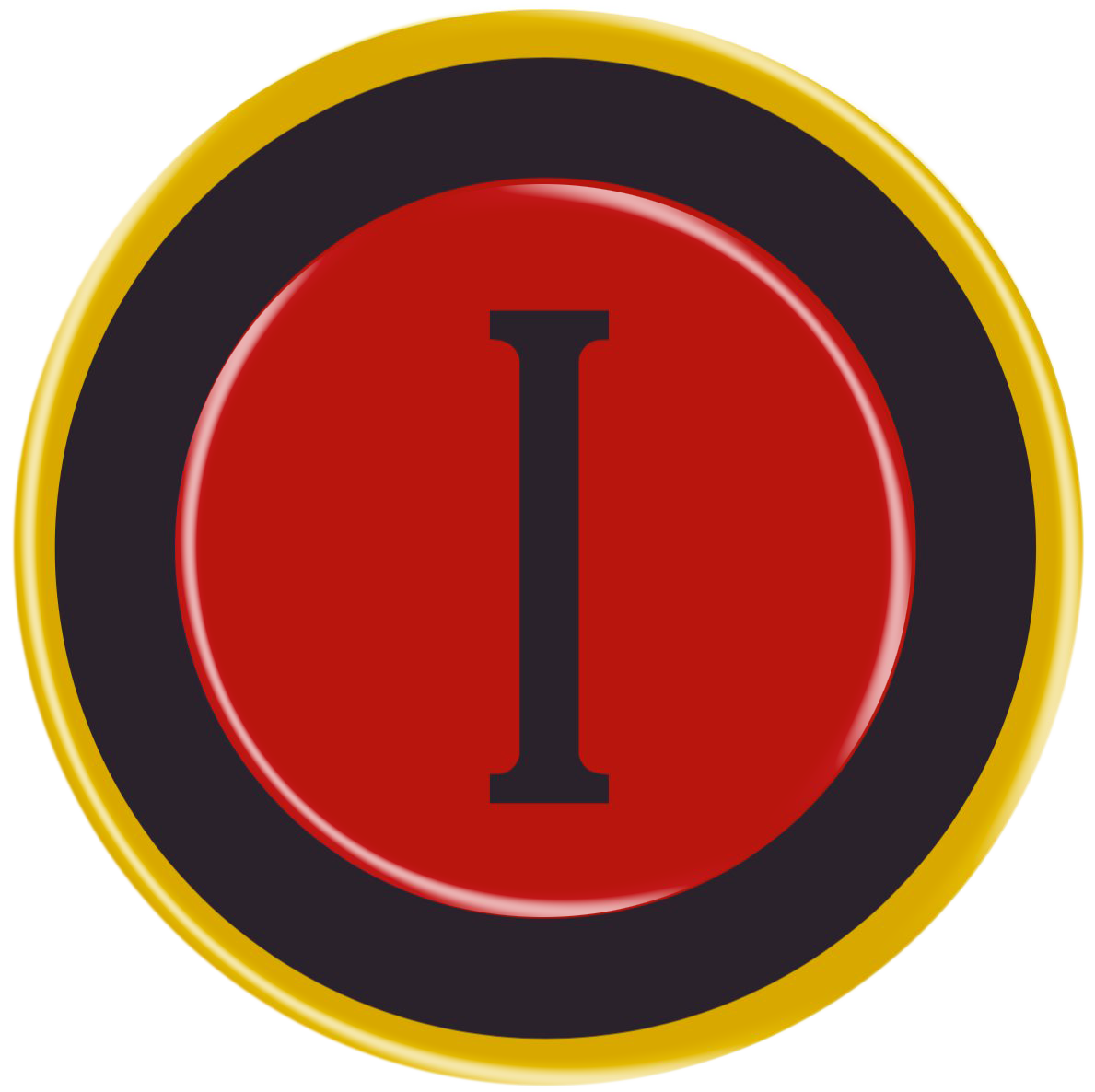
1st Division of the Colombian National Army seal

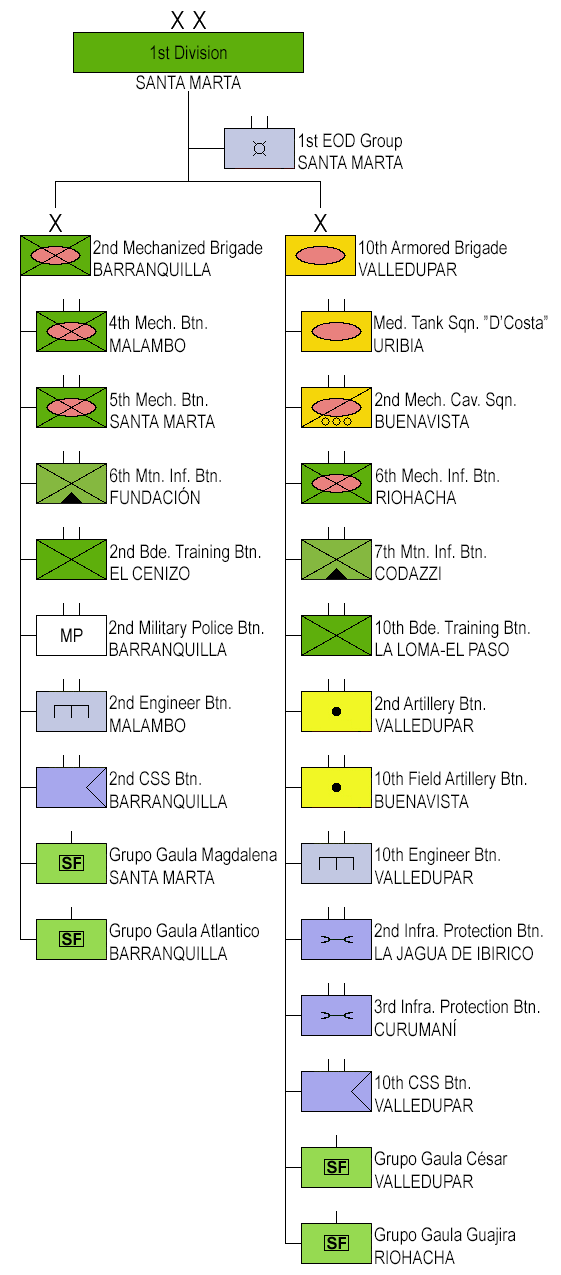
Military Structure of 1st Division of Colombian National Army.

The 1st Division (Spanish: Primera División del Ejército Nacional de Colombia) is a Colombian National Army division consisting on two brigades; The 2nd Brigade based in the city of Barranquilla and the 10th Armored Brigade based in the city of Valledupar. Its current commander is Brigadier General Royer Gómez Herrera.

== History ==
The history of the 1st Division dates back to the reorganization of the Liberator army after Colombia's independence, when the army has two divisions: a vanguard and a rearguard. On June 23, 1883, the Colombian army reorganized its forces into two divisions, including the 1st Division, consisting of two brigades, with the First Brigade composing of the First Artillery Battalion, the Second Sapper Battalion, and the 3rd, 11th, and 13th Infantry Battalions, and the Second Brigade consisting of the 6th Sapper Battalion and the 10th Infantry Battalion, with the total force of approximately 4000 soldiers.

According to the history archives of the First Division, the General Staff of the First Division in 1883 included a Division Commander and Commanding General (a Major General), a First Adjutant General and Chief of Staff (a Colonel), a First Adjutant General (a Captain or Sergeant Major), a Field Assistant of the Division Commander, along with other junior officers and field assistants.

The modern 1st Division of the Colombian National Army was activated on February 19, 1983 in the city of Barranquilla, composing of the 2nd Brigade, based in the same city, and 4th Brigade, based in Medellín. As Barranquilla did not have adequate command infrastructure for the division, the division command was situated temporarily in Bogota, the nation's capital, until the division was transferred to Santa Marta in June 1983. The General Staff of the First Division in 1984 is consisted of: the Division Commander: Major General Josué Leal Barrera, Chief of Staff: Colonel Hernán José Guzmán Rodríguez, Officer G-1 and G-4: Colonel Luis Guerrero Martínez, Officer G-3: Lieutenant Colonel Norberto Adrada Córdoba, Officer G-2: Lieutenant Colonel Tito Rico Busto, and Officer G-5 and Adjutant: Major Harold Hidalgo.

Currently, the 1st Division has two units under its command: the 2nd Brigade and the 10th Armored Brigade, with a total strength 20,000 soldiers; it is responsible for the Colombian departments of Atlántico, Magdalena, Cesar, La Guajira and southern Bolívar.

== Structure ==
=== 2nd Brigade ===
- 2nd Brigade (Segunda Brigada), headquartered in the city of Barranquilla (Atlantico). Current Commanding Officer, Brigadier General Luis Mauricio Ospina Gutierrez. Area of Operations: Departments (States) of Atlantico, Magdalena, and the southern region of Bolivar. Approximately a total of 67 municipios (counties) located in the Colombian Caribbean Coast.
  - 4th Mechanized Infantry Battalion "General Antonio Nariño" (Malambo)
  - 5th Mechanized Infantry Battalion (Santa Marta)
  - 6th Mountain Infantry Battalion (Fundación)
  - 2nd Brigade Training Battalion (El Cenizo)
  - 2nd Military Police Battalion (Barranquilla)
  - 2nd Engineer Battalion (Malambo)
  - 2nd Combat Service Support Battalion (Barranquilla)
  - Gaula Group "Magdalena" (Santa Marta)
  - Gaula Group "Atlantico" (Barranquilla)

=== 10th Armored Brigade ===
- 10th Armored Brigade HQ (Valledupar)
  - Medium Tank Squadron "General Gustavo Matamoros D'Costa" (Uribia)
  - 2nd Mechanized Cavalry Squadron (Buenavista)
  - 6th Mechanized Battalion (Riohacha)
  - 7th Mountain Infantry Battalion (Codazzi)
  - 10th Brigade Training Battalion (La Loma-El Paso)
  - 2nd Artillery Battalion (Valledupar)
  - 10th Field Artillery Battalion (Buenavista)
  - 10th Engineer Battalion (Valledupar)
  - 2nd Infrastructure Protection Battalion (La Jagua de Ibirico)
  - 3rd Infrastructure Protection Battalion (Curumaní)
  - 10th Combat Service Support Battalion (Valledupar)
  - Gaula Group "Cesar" (Valledupar)
  - Gaula Group "Guajira" (Riohacha)

=== Headquarters ===
1st Division Headquarters are located in the city of Santa Marta.
