= Anderson Street Water Tower =

Historic building in California

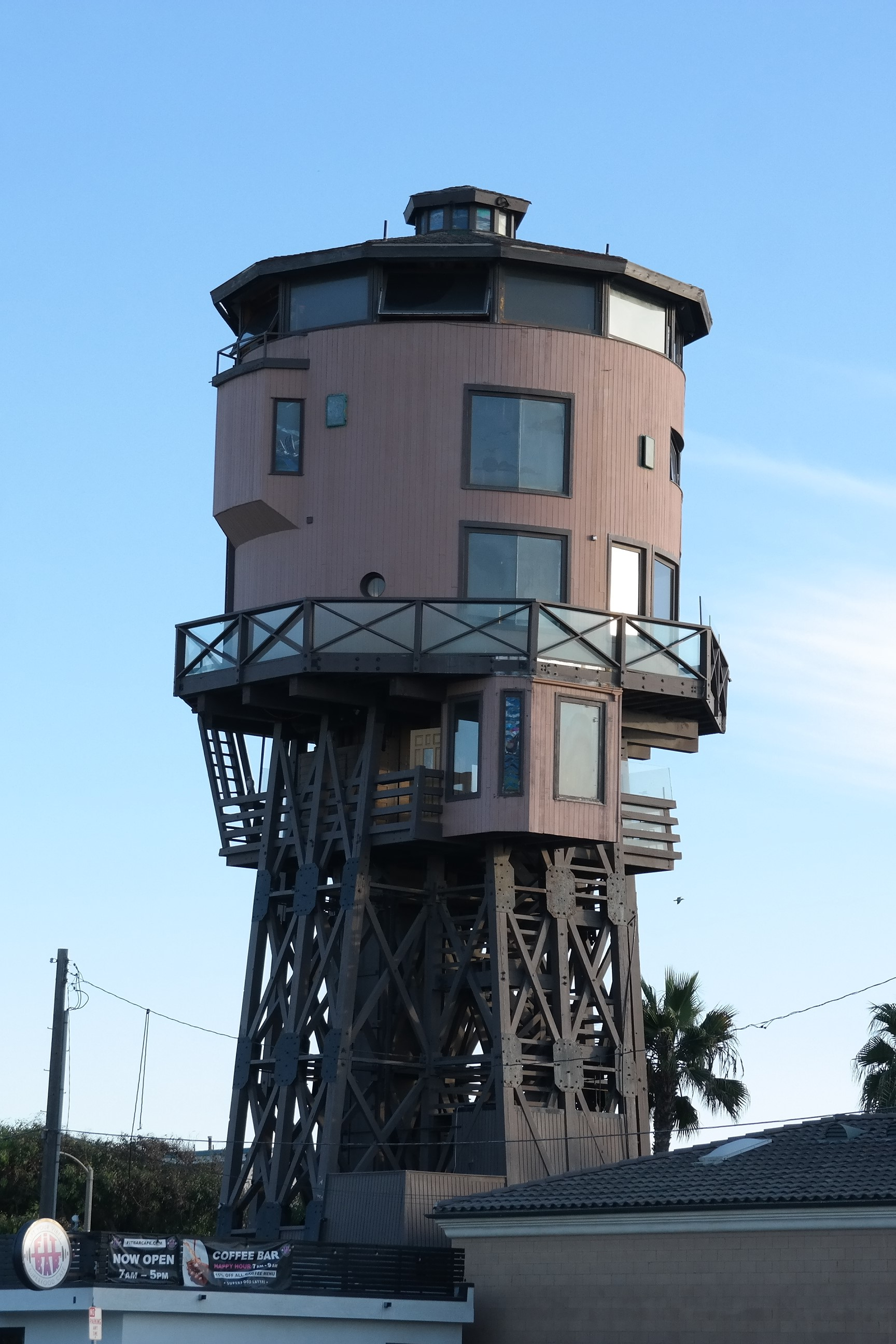
- The tower in 2021

- Location within the Los Angeles metropolitan area Anderson Street Water Tower (California) Anderson Street Water Tower (the United States)

General information
- Location: 1 Anderson St, Seal Beach, CA 90740
- Coordinates: 33.7244°N 118.0784°W
- Year built: 1892
- Owner: Gregg DeNicola; Mary DeNicola

Height
- Height: 87 ft (27 m)

Technical details
- Floor area: 2,800 sq ft (260 m^{2})
- Grounds: 875 sq ft (81.3 m^{2})

Website
- web.archive.org/web/20250316201645/https://sunsetbeachwatertower.com/

The Anderson Street Water Tower, also known as the Water Tower House, Sunset Beach Water Tower, or Pacific Coast Highway Water Tower, is a historic 87 ft (27 m) water tower in Seal Beach, California. Built in 1892, the redwood and fir structure has since been converted into a house. It is currently owned by Gregg and Mary DeNicola, who bought the tower for $4.5 million in 2022 and rented it on Airbnb. It was the tallest family home in the U.S. until the Falcon Nest in Prescott, Arizona overtook it in 2017.

== History ==
The water tower was built in 1892 and was used for supplying water to trains that were traveling from San Diego to Santa Barbara. Each year it was purchased, a year was added to the door, making a total of five as of 2024: 1892, 1940, 1985, 2016, and 2022. In 1940, the Santa Fe Tank & Pipe Co. rebuilt the tank, with it now being able to contain 75,000 US gal (280,000 L), making it the largest water tower ever on the West Coast at the time. At this point, it was being used to store nearby towns' water. The water tower began to degrade by 1980, being termite-infested and graffitied, causing the city to start planning to dismantle the structure.

It was saved by George Armstrong, a math professor at Long Beach City College, who took the tower down, turned it into a three-floor house, and raised it again. It was reopened as a house in 1985. Jerry Wallace, the former Lynwood Fire Chief, bought the house from Armstrong in 1992 and lived in it for eleven years. He eventually sold the house to Scott Ostlund and Barret Woods, a pair of real estate investors, in 2016. It was restored from 2016 to 2017.

== Features ==
The tower is also rented out as a four-bedroom and four-bathroom house. The base of the tower contains a garage and a bedroom for a guard. There is an elevator to the upper part of the water tower, which contains a sunset deck, secret bookshelf, hot tub, kitchen, aquarium family room, dining area, ballroom, bar, and 360° view of the surrounding area.
