= Bay Theater =

Movie theater in California

Coordinates: 33°44′38″N 118°06′10″W

Bay Theatre
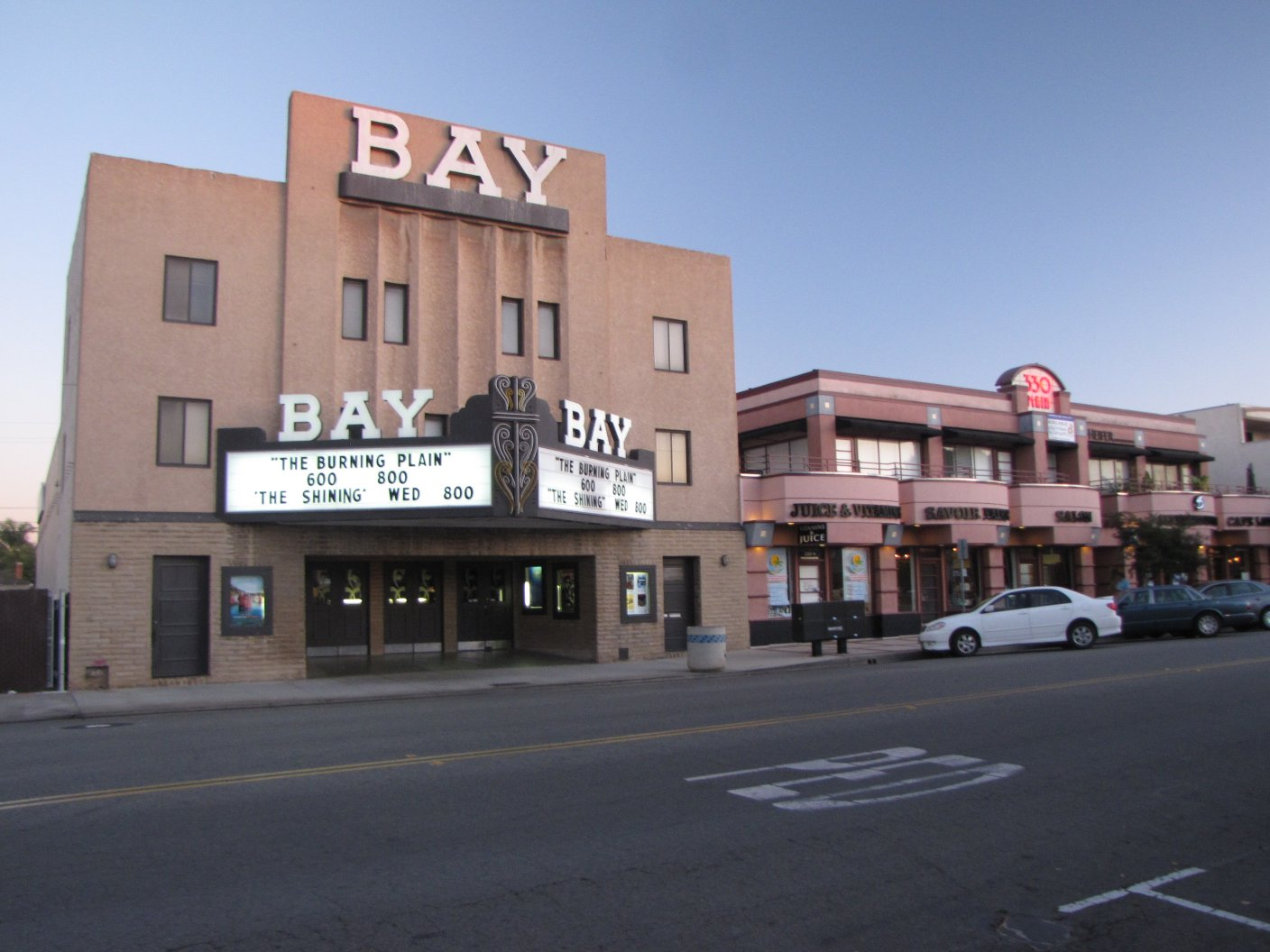
- Interactive map of Bay Theatre
- Former names: Beach Theater
- Address: 340 Main Street
- Location: Seal Beach, California, United States
- Owner: Paul & Nicole Dunlap
- Type: Theatre
- Events: Movies, Films, Live Entertainment

Construction
- Built: May 1, 1945
- Renovated: 2017-2024
- Closed: June 15, 2012
- Reopened: January 25, 2025

Website
- www.baytheatre.com

The Bay Theatre is a single-screen movie theater in Seal Beach, California, United States. It is best known for its screenings of foreign and independent films, and for its revival screenings. The Bay Theatre is also home to a Wurlitzer organ, which is used for concerts and silent film screenings.

== History ==
The theater opened in 1945 as the Beach Theatre. A year later it became a Fox West Coast theater and was renamed the Bay Theatre. Richard Loderhose purchased the theater in 1975.

After removing some of the seats, Loderhose installed a 1928-built Wurlitzer organ that he had purchased in the early 1960s from New York City's Paramount Theater. Designed by organist Jesse Crawford, the 21 rank instrument had originally been installed in the Paramount Building's radio studio (the Paramount's auditorium organ is now in the Century II Exhibition Hall, which is located in Wichita, Kansas). The studio organ was used not only for broadcasts but for making recordings. Loderhouse acquired the organ in 1960 and installed it in his Long Island house. He moved it to the Bay Theatre in 1975. He expanded the organ from its original 21 ranks to 54 ranks. It was called the largest Wurlitzer pipe organ in any operating theater in the world at that time.

With the death of its owner, the organ has been removed and the future of the building in uncertain. The organ itself has been moved to Phoenix, AZ where it will be reinstalled in a public venue for performance, and religious services. The building closed August 2012.

The Seal Beach City Council designated the theater as a historical landmark in September 2016.

The theater is mentioned in an unauthorized biography of Steven Spielberg as being his favorite place to see foreign movies while he was enrolled at nearby Cal State Long Beach in the mid-1960s.

== Restoration ==
According to the HGTV show House Hunters Renovation that aired on November 10, 2018, Bay Theater has been purchased by Paul Dunlap, a real estate investor and his wife Nicole Dunlap the owner of a spa in Seal Beach. The property was purchased for $2.125 million, including upstairs living space.

The theater reopened on January 25, 2025, with a screening of "Harbour Chronicles: Shaping the Legacy,” a documentary about local surfboard maker Rich Harbour who founded Harbour Surfboard's across the street from the theater.
