= 5th Battalion, 14th Marines =

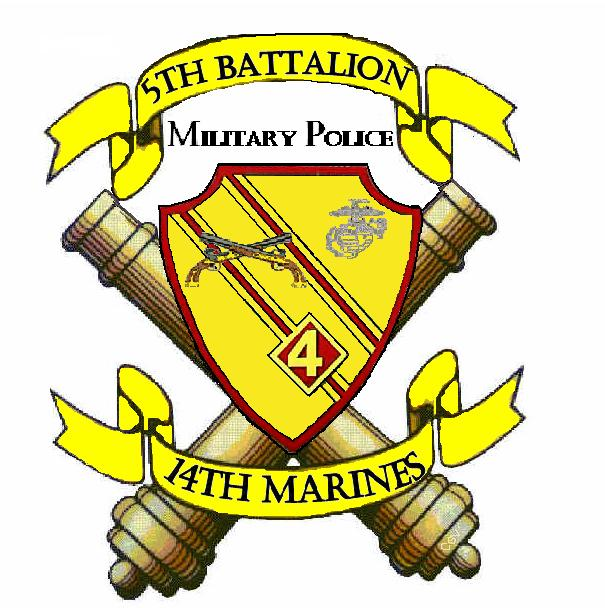
- 5/14 Insignia
- Active: 1 March 1944 – 15 June 1994 – 5 September 1979 – 21 October 2005 – 15 February 2006 – present
- Country: United States of America
- Branch: United States Marine Corps
- Type: Artillery
- Role: Provide fires in support of 4th Marine Division
- Part of: 14th Marine Regiment; 4th Marine Division
- Garrison/HQ: Seal Beach, California
- Motto: The Spirit of Saint Barbara
- Engagements: World War II; Battle of Kwajalein; Battle of Saipan; Battle of Tinian; Battle of Iwo Jima; Iraq War; War in Afghanistan (2001-2021)

Commanders
- Current commander: LtCol Alexander Diener

5th Battalion, 14th Marines (5/14) is a reserve artillery battalion of the United States Marine Corps comprising four firing batteries and a headquarters battery. The battalion is based in Seal Beach, California and its primary weapon system is the M777A2 howitzer with a maximum effective range of 40 km. They fall under the command of the 14th Marine Regiment and the 4th Marine Division.

== Mission ==
5th Battalion, 14th Marines is prepared, upon activation, to provide artillery fires "on time, on target", in the execution of the artillery battalion's tactical mission to provide direct support to a maneuver element or general and reinforcing fires to a senior artillery organization. 5th Battalion, 14th Marines will augment and reinforce active Marine forces, as directed, in time of war, national emergency or contingency operations.

== Current units ==
- Headquarters battery — Seal Beach, California. Commanding officer: Lieutenant Colonel Alexander R. Diener, inspector-instructor: Lieutenant Colonel Eric E. Kim
- Battery N (November Battery) — Seal Beach, California. Commanding officer: Major Jeffrey P. Buege, inspector-instructor: Captain Kenneth H. Hodges.
- Battery O (Oscar Battery) — Seal Beach, California. Commanding officer: Captain David M. Rankin, inspector-instructor: Captain Sterling T. Hampe.
- Battery P (Papa Battery) — Yakima, Washington. Commanding officer: Captain Conner L. W. Gaskins, inspector-instructor: Captain Abrahan J. Mercado.
- Battery Q (Quebec Battery) — Aurora, Colorado. Commanding officer: Captain Donald A. Giron, inspector-instructor: Captain Reilly D. Treat.

== History ==
=== World War II ===
5th Battalion, 14th Marines was created on 1 March 1944, when the 4th Marine Division returned to Camp Maui, Territory of Hawaii, following its first action at the Battle of Kwajalein. The new unit was made up of a headquarters battery plus three firing batteries armed with four M2A1 105 mm howitzers each. This was a short lived activation because the battalion was redesignated the 4th 105mm Howitzer Battalion, V Amphibious Corps (VAC) on 16 April, just six weeks later. This was purely an administrative move since the battalion was attached to the 14th Marine Regiment for upcoming Operation Forager, the invasion of the Marianas. Throughout Operation Forager, the battalion continued to be referred to as "5/14" in after action reports, and at least one official history uses that terminology as well.

The battalion landed on Saipan on 15 June 1944, and was almost wiped out by Japanese fire early the next morning. 10 of 12 of the battalion's howitzers were knocked out of action. Due to extraordinary efforts by service and ordnance personnel, all guns were back in action that afternoon. Although designated a general support element, 5/14 was often used for direct support during the drive north and often fired in support of the 2nd Marine Division and the Army's 27th Infantry Division as well.

Once Saipan was secured, the battalion joined four other Marine 105mm battalions in Groupment A, XXIV Corps Artillery, a temporary task organization created to bombard nearby Tinian. The 105s could range the northern half of Tinian so were used for preliminary fires and then supported the landing by the 4th Marine Division. Once the White Beaches had been taken, the Marine 105s loaded into landing ships then sailed for Tinian Town located about halfway down the island. The 4th 105mm Howitzer Battalion came ashore on 27 July to support the 2nd and 4th Marine Division's final attacks. Upon returning to Maui, the battalion was rearmed and renamed the 4th 155mm Howitzer Battalion, VAC and fought using that designation at the Battle of Iwo Jima then returned to Maui to prepare for the invasion of Japan. The abrupt end of the war in the Pacific resulted in the deactivation of the 4th 155mm Howitzer Battalion in November 1945.

=== Security duties ===
Marines detached from 5/14 (Pico Rivera CA) served at the Naval Weapons Station Seal Beach during The Vietnam War. Marines assigned to Seal Beach primarily served as a Security Detachment for the Naval Weapons Depot while being held in ready reserve for battle duty. Ceremonial duties included Color Guards and Honors Rifle Teams for parades and military funerals. The latter continues until this day.

=== 1980s and 1990s ===
The 5/14 was reactivated as part of the new "Total Force" doctrine adopted following the Vietnam War. From then on, reserve units were to become mirror images of their active duty counterparts. As a result, the 14th Marines were reorganized to include three direct support battalions armed with 105 mm and 155 mm towed howitzers, while two general support battalions were armed with self-propelled heavy cannon. The 3rd Field Artillery Group headquarters located in San Francisco was redesignated HQ, 5/14 on 1 September 1979. The firing batteries were: Battery N, armed with M110 Sp 8-inch howitzers, at El Paso; Battery O, also armed with 8-inch SP howitzers, at Oklahoma City; and Battery N, armed with M107 SP 175mm Guns, at Denver. The other general support battalion (4/14) was armed with M109 155mm SP howitzers. In 1983, Battery P was rearmed with 8-inch howitzers after the 175mm guns were dropped. Two years later the 14th Marines was once again reorganized. This time the 1st and 5th Battalion headquarters batteries swapped designations, so the 5th Battalion was now located at Los Angeles rather than San Francisco; the firing batteries remained as before.

No units of the 5th battalion were activated for service in country during Operation Desert Shield/Desert Storm. 5th Battalion, 14th Marines was originally located in downtown Los Angeles at Chavez Ravine. In 1994 the Northridge earthquake damaged the battalion's facility there and caused the unit to move to the Long Beach Naval Station. When the Naval Station was closed as a result of the Base Realignment and Closure Program the battalion headquarters moved into temporary facilities aboard the Naval Weapons Station Seal Beach, California. The battalion occupied the current site on the Weapons Station, the Sergeant Foster Reserve Training Center, during October 2000.

=== Global War on Terrorism ===
5th Battalion, 14th Marines was deployed to Iraq as a provisional military police battalion from 2005 through 2006. The battalion was augmented with Marines from various units throughout the Marine Corps and the United States to form 5th Provisional Military Police Battalion, 14th Marines. The units included an active duty MP company from Camp Pendleton, Hand picked Correction Marines from Camp Lejeune and Camp Pendleton who served as advisors, a TOW Platoon from 25th Marines, Marines from 4th Force Reconnaissance and Battery C, 1st Battalion, 14th Marines. During its first deployment after 11 September and its first combat-zone deployment since World War II, the battalion operated five detention facilities, guarded Camp Fallujah and the surrounding area, conducted convoy security and conducted law enforcement operations.

Battery N was deployed to southern Afghanistan in the spring of 2009 attached to 3rd Battalion 11th Marines. They are part of the 17,000 troop increase announced by President Obama in mid-February 2009. The battery was split into two supporting operations from FOB Pico and FOB Payne. November Battery's Liaison Section was detached from the Battery and reinforced 2nd BN 3rd Marines to the North in Helmand Province to include the areas of Now Zad, Golestan, and Deleram.

For its part, Battery N was awarded the Presidential Unit Citation as a part of 2nd MEB during Operation Enduring Freedom.

== See also ==
- List of United States Marine Corps battalions
- Organization of the United States Marine Corps
