= Red Car Museum =

Closed museum in California

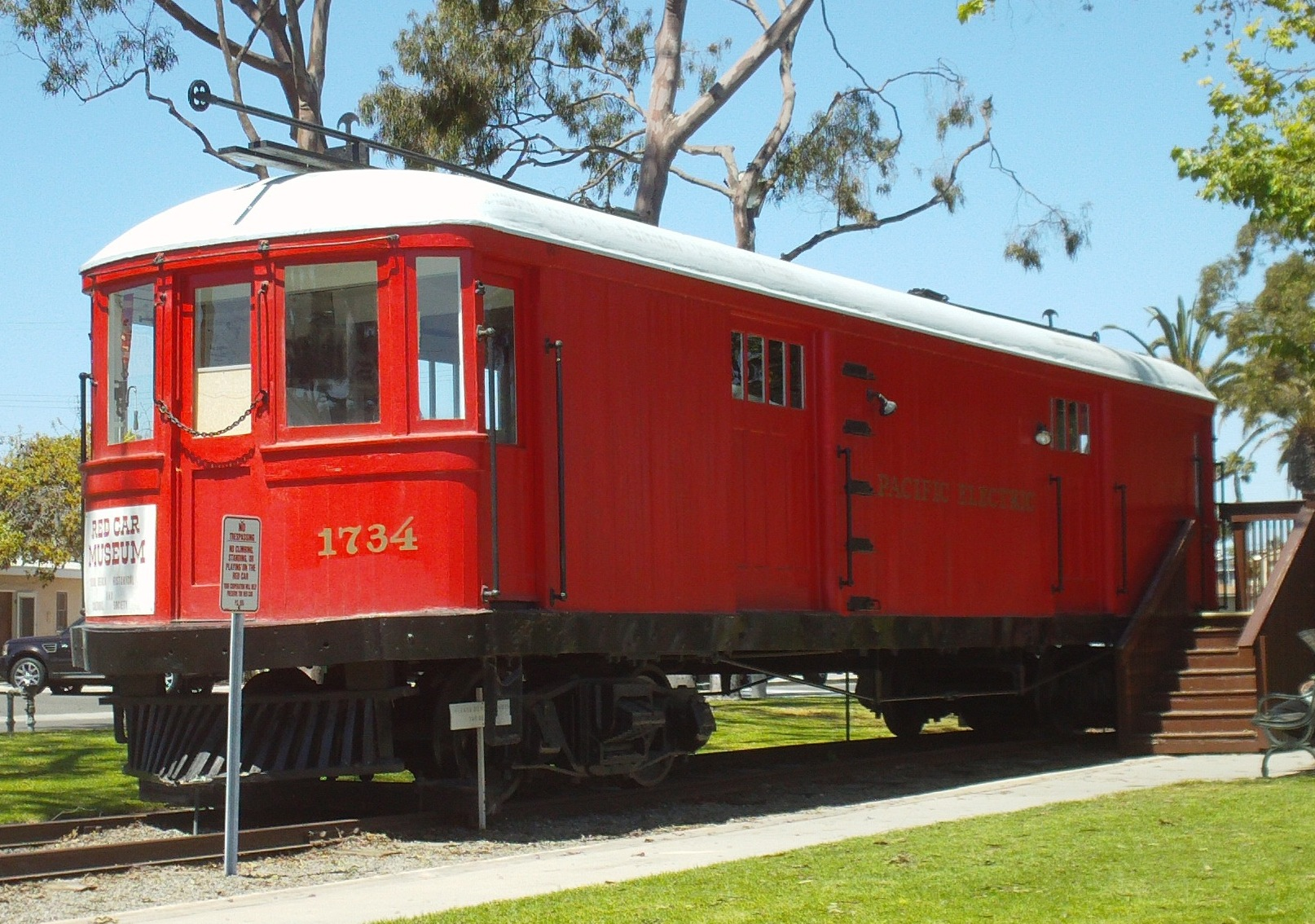
- The car in 2013

- Location within the Los Angeles metropolitan area Location within California Location within the United States
- Established: 1981
- Dissolved: 2021
- Location: 800-840 Electric Ave, Seal Beach, California 90740
- Coordinates: 33.74390°N 118.10462°W
- Founder: Seal Beach Historical Society
- Owner: Seal Beach Lions Club

The Red Car Museum, also known as the Pacific Electric Museum, was a museum in Old Town Seal Beach, California. It operated in Pacific Electric car #1734 and displayed artifacts relating to the company and local history books. It currently is a landmark for passerby, and claims to be the only Red Car left in Orange County. Located on the city's "Greenbelt," it borders the Mary Wilson Library and Seal Beach Centennial House.

== History ==
Red Cars first appeared in Seal Beach on July 4, 1904, just three years after Henry E. Huntington first formed Pacific Electric. The streetcars were popular until the 50s when automobiles took over. The Seal Beach Historical Society bought the car in 1976 and started restoring it, opening it in 1981. The streetcar the museum operated in, #1734, was built in 1925.

A petition asking for a change of ownership of the car garnered over 500 signatures in 2020, causing the city to terminate the car's lease in early 2021. It was created due to people noticing the lack of effort in improving and restoring the museum. Work started to be done on the car beginning in November of that year, and the renovations finished soon after. The society removed the items from the museum following the cancellation of the lease before it was repurchased by the Seal Beach Lions Club, a local division of Lions Clubs International, for $1,501. The Lions Club restored the railroad crossing sign in front of the streetcar and completed a cleanup of the vehicle itself.

== Features ==
The museum contained photographs, clothing for its time, seashells, newspapers, and some of Pacific Electric's legal papers. All of the museum's artifacts are currently in possession of the Seal Beach Historical Society, who took them with it when they were bought out.
