= 5th Assam Police Commando Battalion, Pabhoi =

Coordinates: 26.86670°N 93.11995°E

- Motto: জনহিতজনসেৱাৰ্থে (Jonohit Jonxewarthe) – Always at your service

Jurisdictional structure
- Operations jurisdiction: Assam
- Area: 218 bighas (70 acres) at HQ
- Legal jurisdiction: Statewide (with focus on urban operations, law & order, and support deployments)
- Governing body: Government of Assam
- General nature: Local civilian police

Operational structure
- Headquarters: Pabhoi, Biswanath district, Assam
- Agency executive: Ponjit Dowarah, APS, Commandant
- Parent agency: Assam Police

Website
- https://police.assam.gov.in

The 5th Assam Police Commando Battalion, Pabhoi (abbreviated as 5th CDO Bn or 5th Assam Commando Battalion) is a specialized commando unit of the Assam Police, headquartered at Pabhoi in Biswanath district, Assam, India. It is designated primarily for urban operations and law and order duties, and also supports roles such as counter-insurgency, rapid response to exigencies, and assistance in wildlife protection operations in forest areas.The initiative was part of a broader plan by the Government of Assam to raise multiple commando battalions across the state.

== Origin ==
The battalion was approved by the Government of Assam cabinet on 18 July 2022 as one of five new commando battalions to enhance internal security, counter-insurgency, and rapid response capabilities. Chief Minister Himanta Biswa Sarma laid the foundation stone on 10 December 2022. The headquarters was inaugurated by the Chief Minister on 4 October 2025 at a cost of approximately ₹177 crore.In February 2026, during the inauguration of the 6th battalion at Ambikapur, Sarma described the 5th at Pabhoi as part of the state's expanding commando network to address emerging security challenges and strengthen border protection.

== Training and induction ==
Personnel for the battalion, along with those from the other four newly raised commando battalions (totaling 2,551 commandos), underwent advanced training in collaboration with the Indian Army. The programme began in late 2022 across seven locations in Assam, with Army instructors providing training in combat, counter-insurgency, special operations, physical fitness, and advanced weapons handling, supplemented by Assam Police modules on legal and policing procedures. Training concluded with a Passing Out Parade on 20 January 2024 at Sarusajai Sports Complex, Guwahati, reviewed by Union Home Minister Amit Shah (chief guest) and attended by Chief Minister Sarma. The event included demonstrations of martial arts, hostage rescue, helicopter slithering, and simulated anti-insurgent operations.

== Facilities ==
The headquarters spans approximately 218 bighas and includes residential quarters and barracks for about 400 personnel, nine watchtowers, underground bunkers with magazine vaults, a helipad, a 10-bed hospital, a school for children of personnel, a Namghar (prayer hall), parade ground, shooting range, obstacle course, computer classrooms, and other and other training facilities.

== Operation ==
On 27 June 2025, a team from the battalion deployed at the Kahitema Beat of Manas National Park and Tiger Reserve conducted a joint patrolling operation with the Forest Department and Assam Police. They they reported apprehending a suspected poacher in the Kuklung area and seized two handmade weapons, preventing a potential wildlife crime in this UNESCO World Heritage site.

== Individual achievements ==
Women Police Constable Rekhamoni Saikia, part of the Assam Police Athletic Team from the battalion, secured second position in the 21 km Half Marathon at the 5th Assam Rifles Half Marathon held in Shillong, Meghalaya. Constable Priya Boro of the battalion won a bronze medal in Wushu at the 38th National Games in Uttarakhand.

== See also ==
- Assam Police
- Biswanath district
