= 5th (1st Silesian) Jäger Battalion "von Neumann" =

- Jäger-Bataillon „von Neumann“ (1. Schlesisches) Nr. 5
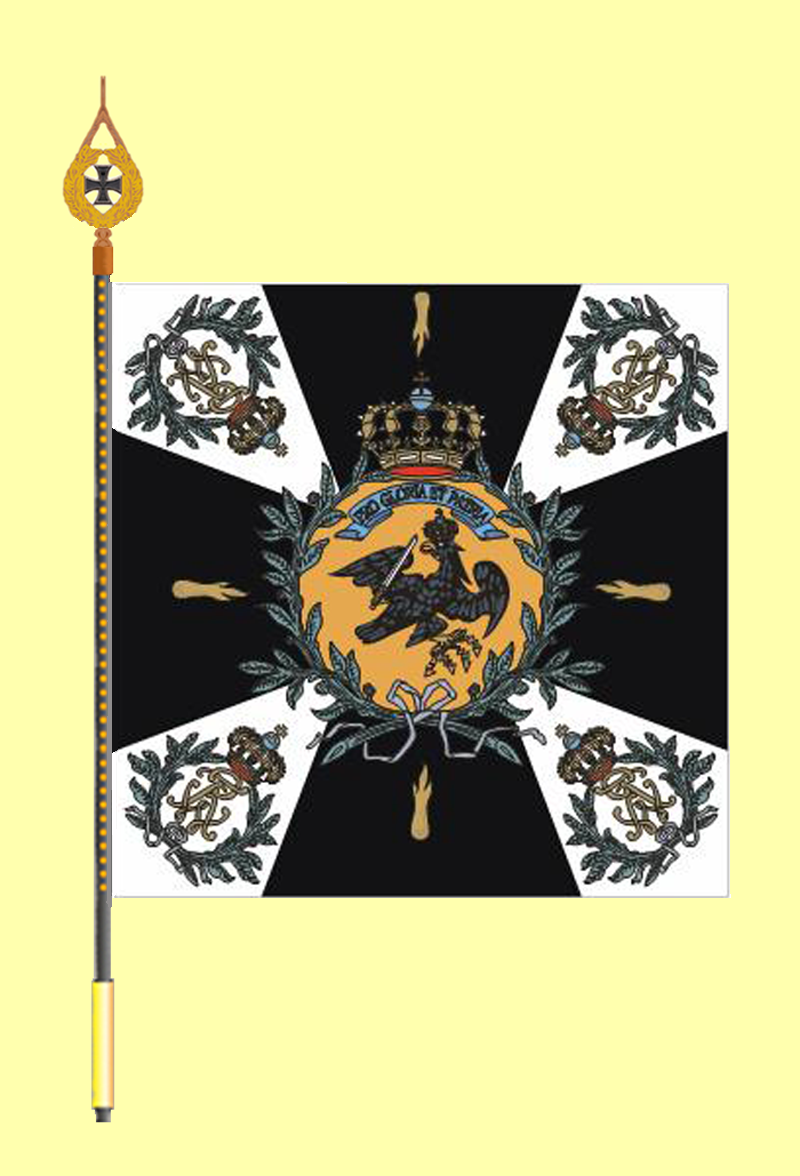
- Regimental standard of the Silesian Rifle Battalion.
- Active: 1808–1919
- Country: Prussia
- Allegiance: Prussian Army
- Branch: Army
- Type: Light infantry
- Colors: Dark green

Commanders
- Notable commanders: Major August von Neumann

The 5th (1st Silesian) Jäger Battalion "von Neumann" (German: Jäger-Bataillon „von Neumann“ (1. Schlesisches) Nr. 5), formerly known as the Silesian Rifle Battalion (German: Schlesiches Schützen-Bataillon) was an infantry unit of the Prussian Army from 1808 until 1919.

== History ==
On 21 November 1808, the battalion formed under the name Schlesiches Schützen-Bataillon (Silesian Rifle Battalion). It was formed from several light infantry companies that fought during the War of the Fourth Coalition. The unit consisted of mainly light infantry drawn from eleven companies. The men of the battalion received green uniforms and received training in the same manner as Jäger battalions.

The battalion assembled on 8 March 1809 in Reichenbach in Eulengebirge, Silesia. On 14 April 1809, General Ludwig Yorck von Wartenburg was appointed as the special inspector of the battalion. The battalion, as part of the Prussian II Army Corps, participated in several battles during the War of the Sixth Coalition, including the Battle of Lützen and the Battle of Leipzig. During the Hundred Days, the battalion participated at the Battle of Ligny as part of the 3rd Brigade of the Prussian I Corps. During the Battle of Ligny, the unit, along with several other Prussian Schützen (riflemen) battalions, took up positions along the edge of the village of Ligny. The unit also took part in the Battle of Waterloo.

Following the Napoleonic Wars, the unit was renamed to the 1st (Silesian) Rifle Battalion, and the 1st (West Prussian) Rifle Detachment was formed from the battalion's first and second companies. On 1 October 1845, it was renamed the 5th Jäger Detachment, and with the formation of a 3rd Company on 21 November 1848, the unit was again renamed the 5th Jäger Battalion.

In 1849, the unit took part in suppressing the German revolutions of 1848-49 as part of the Prussian II Army Corps, and participated in engagements and skirmishes at Heidelberg, Federbach, and Hirschgrund.

During the Austro-Prussian War, the unit participated in a skirmish at Schweinschadel, as well as an artillery engagement at Gradlik and at the Battle of Königgrätz. As part of the 5th Army Corps 9th Infantry Division.

During the Franco-Prussian War, the battalion participated at the Battle of Wissembourg as well as in the Battle of Wörth and the Battle of Sedan. On 27 January 1889, Kaiser Wilhelm II ordered that the unit be renamed the 5th (1st Silesian) Jäger Battalion "von Neumann" in honor of Major August von Neumann, who had commanded the unit during the War of the Sixth Coalition as well as during the Hundred Days.

=== First World War ===
The unit mobilized from 1–4 August 1914, and was initially part of the 9th Infantry Division until 6 August 1914, when it was transferred to the 6th Cavalry Division on 7 August 1914. The unit crossed into the French border in mid-August and acted as a reconnaissance unit ahead of the German 5th Army. In late August, the unit participated in engagements near Longwy during the Battle of the Frontiers. In 1916, it was transferred to the Eastern Front, where it fought in Eastern Galicia as well as against the Russians during the Brusilov offenisve. The regiment was transferred back to the Western Front in April 1917, and it later fought in the German spring offensive in 1918.

Following the Armistice of Compiègne, the regiment marched back to its garrison and demobilized in 1919.

== Uniforms and equipment ==
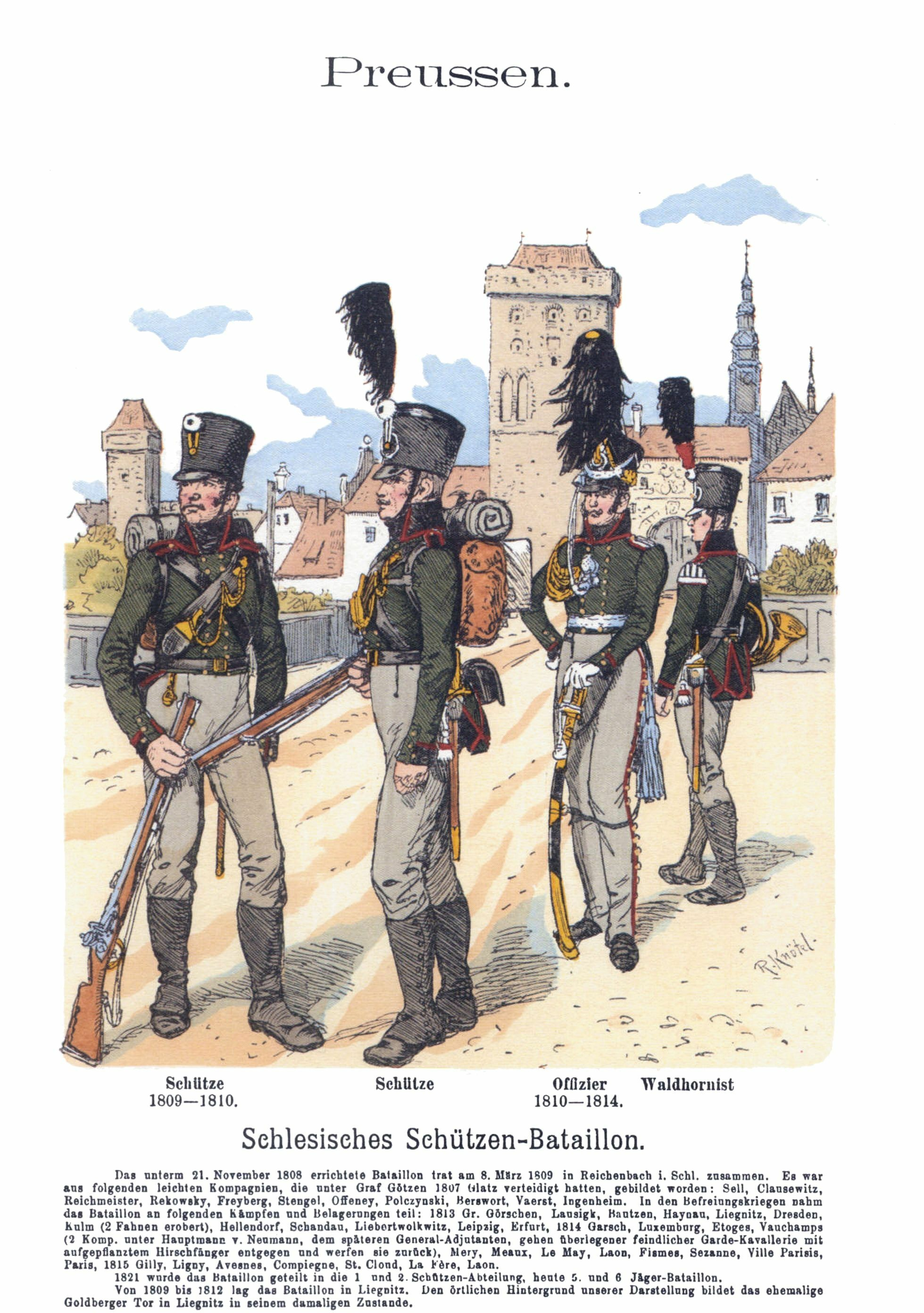
Uniforms of the Silesian Rifle Battalion.

During the Napoleonic Wars, the men of the Silesian Rifle Battalion wore a black felt shako with a Prussian cockade and a black and white pompom. As with many German Jäger and riflemen battalions at the time, the battalion's uniform was a dark green tunic with gold brass buttons and red trim, along with a black neckerchief, a black belt, and a black ammunition box. The battalion was equipped with the Potzdam musket.

== Commanders ==
The battalion's first commander was Major/Lieutenant Colonel Ludwig Gans zu Putlitz, who served as the unit's commander from 17 February 1809 until 10 January 1810. He was followed by Major Christoph von Crammon, who served from 17 January 1810 until 19 February 1812.

One of the unit's more notable commanders, Major August von Neumann, served from 4 February 1814 until 9 October 1815. During the Austro-Prussian War, the unit's commander was Lieutenant Colonel Rudolf von Waldersee. During the Franco-Prussian War, the unit's commander was Lieutenant Colonel Christian Boedecker. The battalion's last commander was Captain Leopold Wegener, who served from 26 April 1918 until 8 January 1919.
