= 5th Pioneer Battalion =

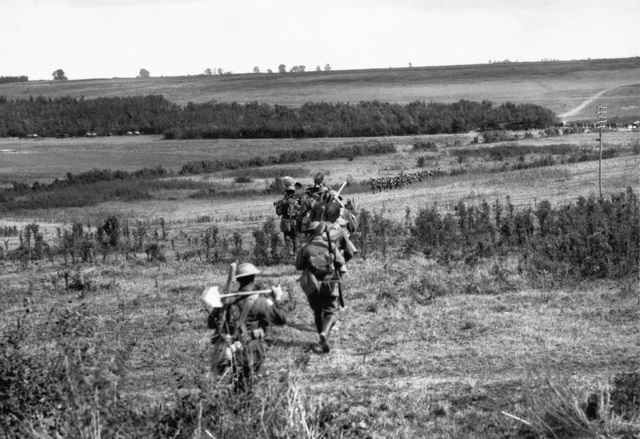
- 5th Pioneers around Picardie, September 1918
- Active: 1916–1919
- Country: Australia
- Branch: Australian Army
- Role: Pioneer
- Size: Battalion
- Part of: 5th Division
- Garrison/HQ: South Australia/Western Australia
- Colours: Purple and white
- Engagements: First World War: Western Front

Insignia
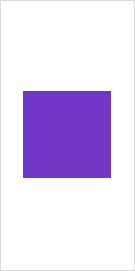
- Unit colour patch

The 5th Pioneer Battalion was an Australian infantry and light engineer unit raised for service during the First World War as part of the all volunteer Australian Imperial Force (AIF). Formed in Egypt in March 1916, the battalion subsequently served on the Western Front in France and Belgium, after being transferred to the European battlefields shortly after its establishment. Assigned to the 5th Division, the 5th Pioneer Battalion fought in most of the major battles that the AIF participated in between mid-1916 and the end of the war in November 1918. It was subsequently disbanded in early 1919.

== History ==
=== Formation and training ===
The 5th Pioneers were established on 10 March 1916, at Tel-el-Kebir in Egypt, and were subsequently assigned to the 5th Division. The battalion was formed in the aftermath of the failed Gallipoli campaign when the Australian Imperial Force (AIF) was expanded as part of plans to transfer it from the Middle East to Europe for service in the trenches along the Western Front. This expansion saw several new infantry divisions raised in Egypt and Australia, as well as specialist support units such as machine gun companies, engineer companies, artillery batteries and pioneer battalions, which were needed to meet the conditions prevalent on the Western Front.

Trained as infantrymen, they were also tasked with some engineer functions, with a large number of personnel possessing trade qualifications from civilian life. As such, they were designated as pioneer units. The pioneer concept had existed within the British Indian Army before the war, but had not initially been adopted in other British Empire forces. In early 1916, the Australian Army was reorganised ahead of its transfer to the Western Front in Europe. A total of five pioneer battalions were raised by the AIF at this time, with one being assigned to each of the five infantry divisions that the Australians deployed to the battlefield in France and Belgium. Tasked with digging trenches, labouring, constructing strong points and light railways, and undertaking battlefield clearance, the troops assigned to the pioneers required construction and engineering experience in addition to basic soldiering skills.

The 5th Pioneer Battalion was formed from volunteers from the 5th Division who possessed relevant trade qualifications, or who were deemed to be suitable for manual labouring tasks. Many were skilled and experienced in mining and other artisanal trades. According to some sources a majority of the battalion's recruits were from South Australia, although others refer to a significant proportion originating from Western Australia.

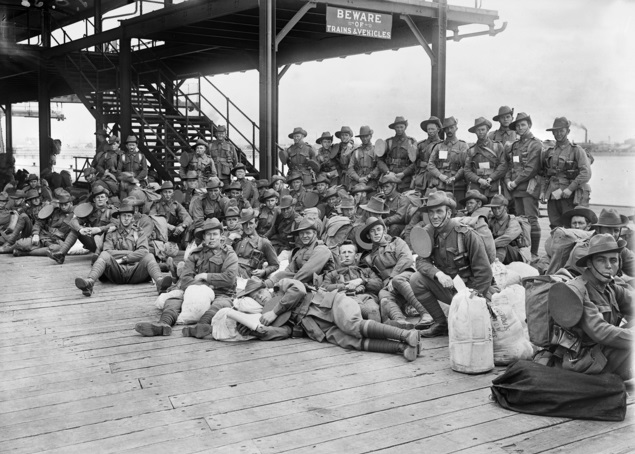
The 10th Reinforcements of the 5th Pioneers at Port Melbourne prior to embarkation, October 1917.

Three pioneer companies, and a headquarters company were formed. Volunteers from the 8th Brigade formed "A" Company, 5th Pioneers; those from the 14th Brigade became "B Company and volunteers from the 15th Brigade, formed "C" Company. The battalion's first commanding officer was Lieutenant Colonel Herbert Carter. The battalion was assigned a horizontal, rectangular purple and white unit colour patch. The shape denoted that the unit was part of the 5th Division, and the colours those used by the other Australian pioneer battalions.

Training was undertaken around Mahsama and Ismailia, in Egypt, before the battalion was assigned to repair railway lines around the canal zone. In June 1916, the battalion was transported to Alexandria where they boarded the transport vessel Canada, bound for Europe.

=== In action ===
After making landfall at Marseille, the 5th Pioneers were transported overland by train to Hazebrouck, where they moved into a camp around Bae St Maur. There they laid telephone cables and constructed railway lines, as part of their introduction to the front line. The battalion subsequently served with the 5th Division on the Western Front until the end of the war. Their first major action came around Fromelles on 19 July 1916, where the Australians made their debut on the Western Front. Two companies of pioneers were assigned to support the attack, and it proved to be a difficult entry into the European war, with the Australians suffering such heavy casualties that the battle was later described as "the worst 24 hours in Australia's entire history". Australian forces were brought down quickly

Later, the battalion took part in the pursuit of German forces as they withdrew towards the Hindenburg Line in early 1917, working to extend the 5th Division's supply railway from Ginchy to Bealencourt in March. Throughout April they extended the line around Fremicourt towards Vaulx–Vraucourt, providing the means for the Allies to bring up guns and ammunition with which to lay down a heavy bombardment on the Hindenburg Line. The following month the battalion supported the Second Battle of Bullecourt, assisting the British 258th Tunnelling Company to dig a defensive mine to the east, suffering 39 casualties during the fighting. Their next major action came around Ypres later in the year. By September, the pioneers were working to construct plank roads behind the lines around Zillebeke and Hooge to make the roads passable for artillery and supplies in an effort to prepare for the coming offensive. Casualties during the fighting around Polygon Wood cost the battalion 81 casualties.

In early 1918, the 5th Pioneers supported the Allied defensive actions that were fought in response to the German spring offensive. In mid-April, during the Second Battle of Villers-Bretonneux, elements of the battalion were subjected to a gas attack whilst guarding road-mines around the village. They were later employed to dig a defensive switch to provide flank defence prior to the German attack and connect the first and second line of defensive systems. After the Allies had blunted the German offensive, in the lull that followed the Allies sought to regain the initiative through a series of minor attacks before going on the offensive. During this period, the battalion took part in an attack around Morlancourt at the end of July, during which they suffered 16 casualties. The Allies launched their Hundred Days Offensive around Amiens in August 1918, which ultimately brought about an end to the war. As a part of this offensive, the 5th Pioneers supported actions around Peronne at the end of August.

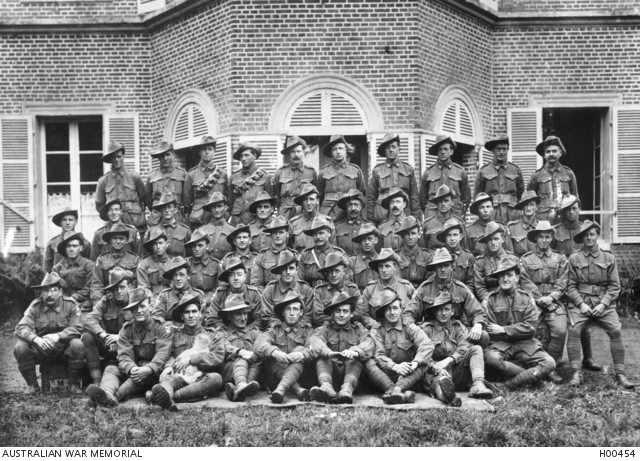
Group portrait of members of the Australian 5th Pioneer Battalion taken outside the chateau at Cerisy-Buleux, France, November 1918.

Their final actions of the war were fought around Bellicourt during the Battle of the St. Quentin Canal in late September and early October 1918. In a single day in late September, the pioneers lost 64 men fighting alongside Americans from the US 105th Engineers, as the battalion became caught up in close quarters fighting, having to "down tools" and deal with isolated pockets of resistance, before working to capture several machine gun positions that had been bypassed by the assaulting infantry in the smoke haze. After this, they were withdrawn from the line with the other units of the Australian Corps for rest at the behest of the Australian prime minister, Billy Hughes. Following the armistice in November 1918, the battalion remained on the continent as the demobilisation process began. Personnel were repatriated to Australia via the United Kingdom, where they undertook various education courses to prepare them to return to civilian life. The final 130 men of the battalion departed for the United Kingdom on 15 May 1919, returning to Australia later in the year.

== Legacy ==
Within the AIF, according to historian William Westerman, the pioneer battalion concept was not "effectively employed by Australian commanders". In this regard, Westerman argues that the AIF pioneer battalions were rigidly utilized as either engineers or infantry, instead of "integrating those two functions". Additionally, while he argues that they were under utilised in their infantry roles, and that the amount of time that was spent training as infantry and the resources consumed was disproportionate for the amount of time they spent in the line undertaking infantry tasks. While some battalions, such as the 2nd Pioneers at Montrebrehain and the 5th around Bellicourt, undertook successful infantry actions, units such the 1st and 4th Pioneers never saw action directly in their infantry role. Additionally, the units' separation from the field engineers resulted in "administrative, organisational and command and control problems" which even limited their utility as engineering formations.

After the war, the concept of pioneer battalions was discontinued in the Australian Army. In the immediate aftermath of the war, as plans were drawn up for the shape of the post conflict Army, a proposal was put forth to raise six pioneer battalions in the peacetime Army, but a combination of global disarmament and financial hardship resulted in this plan being scrapped. As a result, pioneer battalions disappeared from the Australian Army order of battle until the Second World War, when four such battalions were raised as part of the Second Australian Imperial Force. According to Alexander Rodger, as a result of the decision not to re-raise pioneer battalions in the interwar years, no battle honours were subsequently awarded to the 5th Pioneer Battalion – or any other First World War pioneer battalion – as there was no equivalent unit to perpetuate the honours when they were promulgated by the Australian Army in 1927.
