= 5th Battalion Bombay Sepoys =

5th Battalion Bombay Sepoys may refer to:

- 109th Infantry which was called the 5th Battalion Bombay Sepoys in 1768
- 104th Wellesley's Rifles which was called the 5th Battalion Bombay Sepoys in 1775
