= 5th Mechanized Infantry Battalion =

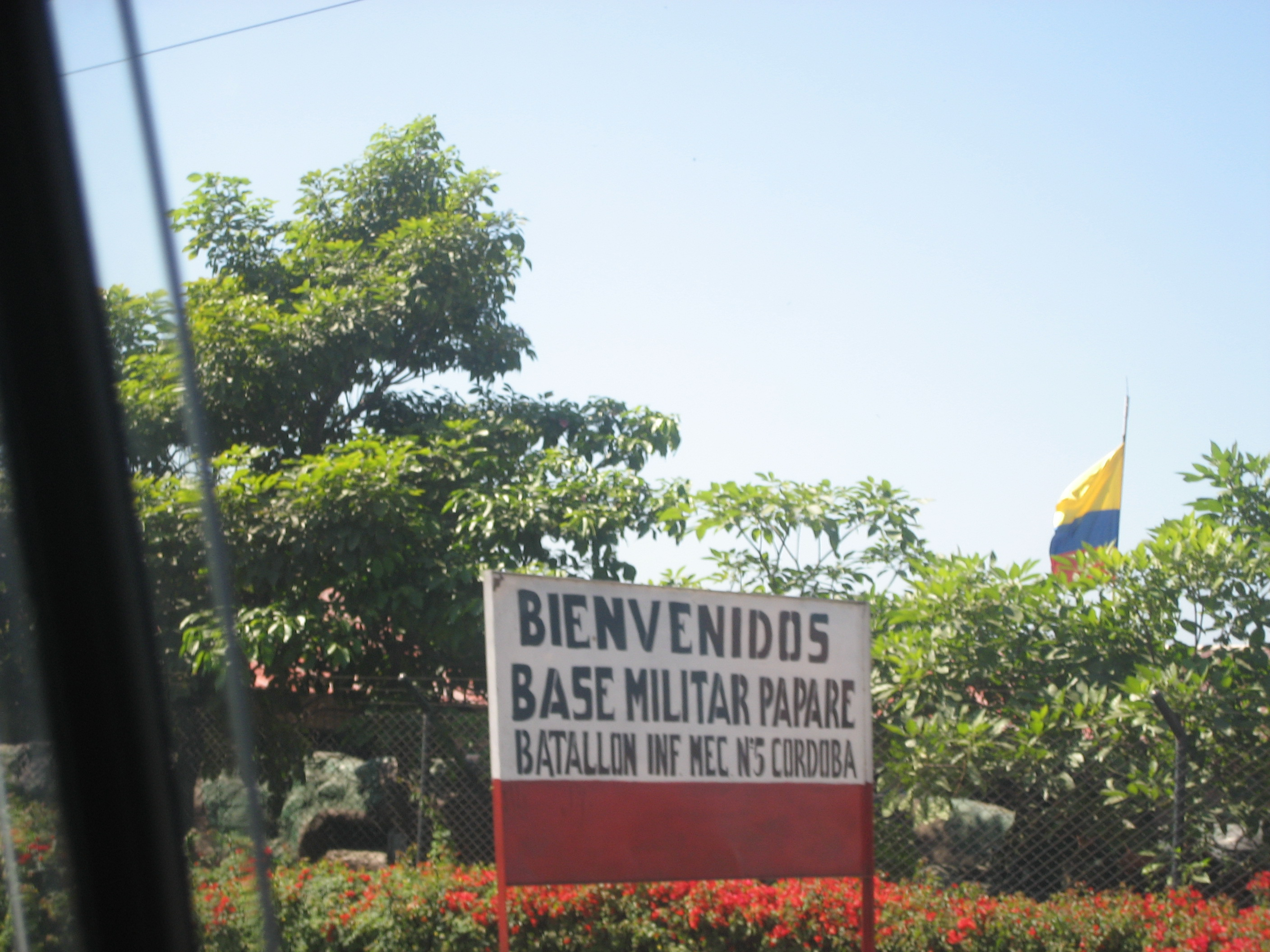
Entrance to Papare Military Base in Santa Marta, where the battalion is stationed

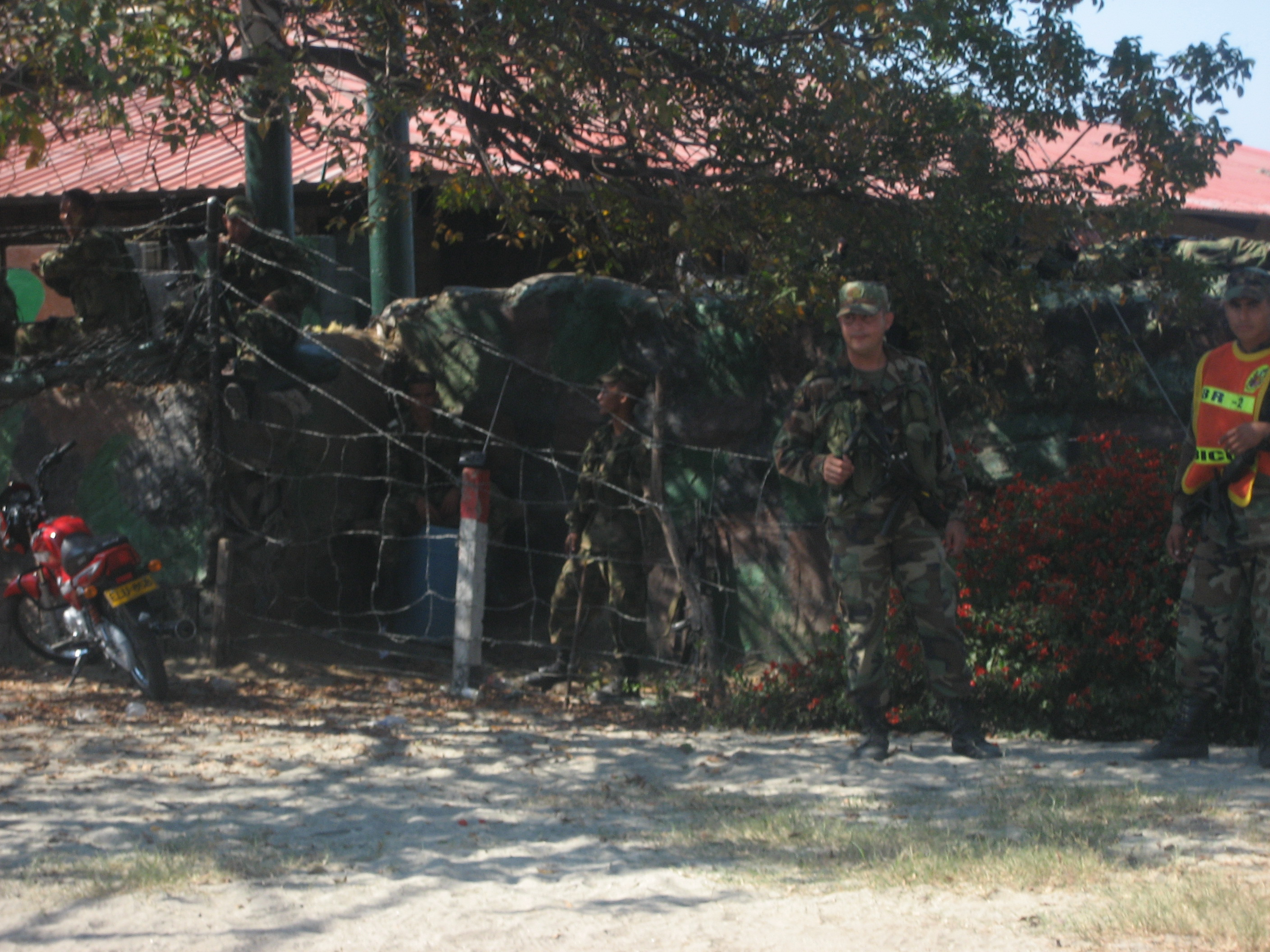
Soldiers in front of the Papare military base on guard duty

The 5th Mechanized Infantry Battalion, Jose Maria Cordova (Spanish: Batallon de Infanteria Mecanizada Numero 5, Jose Maria Cordova) is a mechanized infantry battalion of the Colombian National Army under the command of the 2nd Brigade of the 1st Division. The unit is based on the outskirts of the city of Santa Marta at the Papare Military Base.
