= Seal Beach, California =

City in California, United States

- City
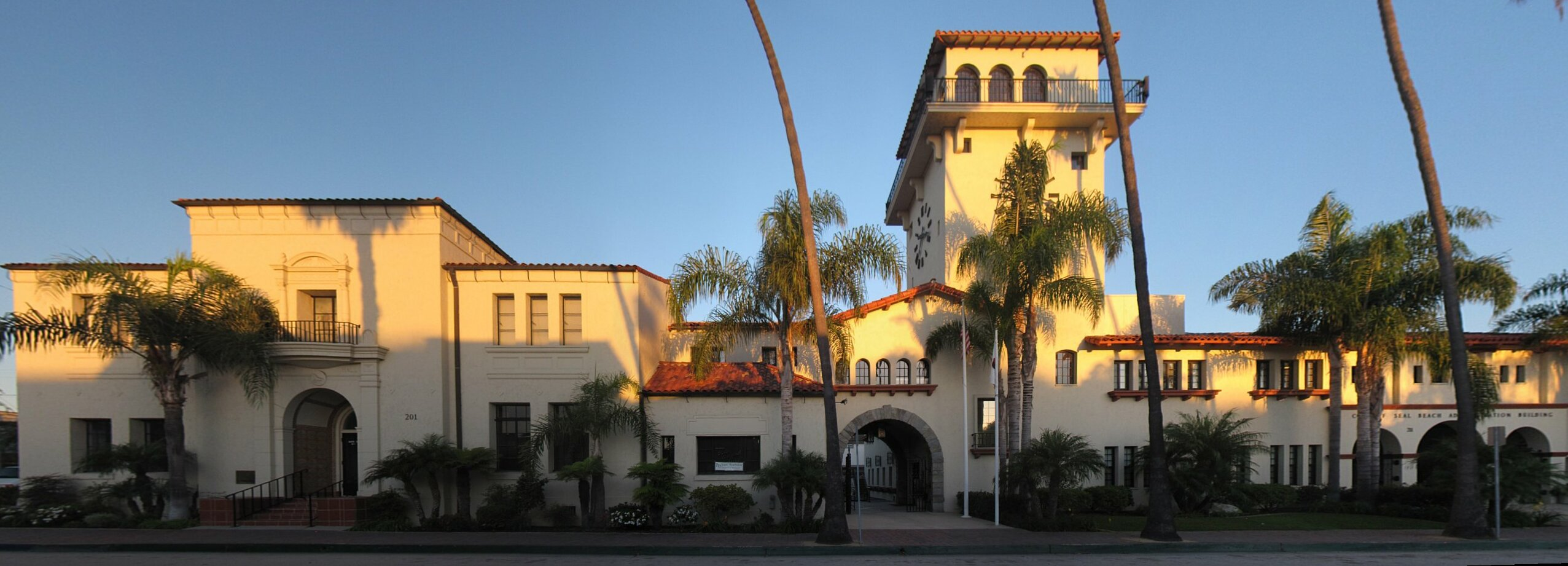
- Historic Mission Revival Seal Beach City Hall

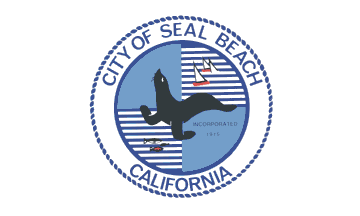
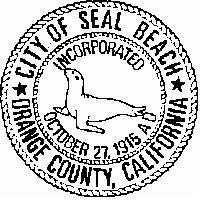
- Flag Seal
- Interactive map of Seal Beach, California
- Location within Greater Los Angeles Location in California Location in the United States
- Coordinates: 33°45′33″N 118°4′57″W
- Country: United States
- State: California
- County: Orange
- Incorporated: October 27, 1915

Government
  - Type: Council/city manager
  - Mayor: Lisa Landau
  - Mayor Pro Tem: Nathan Steele
  - City Council: Joe Kalmick; Ben Wong; Patty Senecal
  - City Manager: Patrick Gallegos

Area
  - Total: 11.80 sq mi (30.56 km^{2})
  - Land: 11.27 sq mi (29.19 km^{2})
  - Water: 0.53 sq mi (1.38 km^{2}) 4.51%
- Elevation: 13 ft (4 m)

Population (2020)
  - Total: 25,242
  - Density: 2,240/sq mi (864.7/km^{2})
- Time zone: UTC-8 (Pacific Time Zone)
  - Summer (DST): UTC-7 (PDT)
- ZIP code: 90740
- Area code: 562
- FIPS code: 06-70686
- GNIS feature IDs: 1661416, 2411851
- Website: www.sealbeachca.gov

California Historical Landmark
- Official name: Anaheim Landing
- Reference no.: 219

Seal Beach is a coastal city in Orange County, California, United States. It was originally known as Bay City before it was incorporated into Orange County under its current name on October 24, 1915. As of the 2020 census, the population was 25,242, up from 24,168 at the 2010 census.

Seal Beach is located in the westernmost corner of Orange County. To the northwest, just across the border with Los Angeles County, lies the city of Long Beach and the adjacent San Pedro Bay. To the southeast are Huntington Harbour, a neighborhood of Huntington Beach, and Sunset Beach, also part of Huntington Beach. To the east lie the city of Westminster and the neighborhood of West Garden Grove, part of the city of Garden Grove. To the north lie the unincorporated community of Rossmoor and the city of Los Alamitos. A majority of the city's acreage is devoted to the Naval Weapons Station Seal Beach military base.

== History ==
=== Indigenous ===
The Tongva village of Motuucheyngna was located in what is now Seal Beach in the area of the Los Cerritos Wetlands. It was part of the greater area of Puvungna, which was a major ceremonial and regional trading center for the Tongva and Acjachemen. Villagers used te'aats to travel out to villages on Pimu (Santa Catalina Island) and other islands off the coast, now referred to as the Channel Islands. In 2003, a burial site of the village was disturbed in a 196-acre (79 ha) Seal Beach residential development, Hellman Ranch, that was met with opposition from the Tongva.

=== Anaheim Landing ===
Beginning in the mid-1860s, the eastern area of what is now Old Town Seal Beach became known as Anaheim Landing. A warehouse and wharf had been built on a small bay where Anaheim Creek emptied into the Pacific Ocean. It was established by farmers and merchants in the newly settled town of Anaheim who wanted a closer, more convenient port to ship the wine they were vinting from their grapes, and also to receive shipped items they needed to help build homes, and buildings, in their new town.

For a few years, Anaheim Landing came close to rivaling San Pedro for its volume of shipping, but the arrival of the railroad in Anaheim in 1875 made it easier to ship products via the rails, than by hauling a wagon overland across 12 miles (19 km) of soft soil to the Landing. The beaches and surrounding rolling Anaheim Landing had by this time become popular as a getaway from hot summer days. Los Angeles newspapers reported a permanent summer population of as many as 400 and even more on special days.

The landing was also home to a number of fishing boats that plied the local fishing areas. This activity was written about by Nobel-prize winning author Henryk Sienkiewicz in a short essay, "The Cranes." The site of Anaheim Landing is now registered as a California Historical Landmark.

In 1903 Los Angeles realtor Philip A. Stanton, very familiar with the area from his time selling land in Anaheim, and Huntington Beach, and also from representing the local real estate interests of banker (and Pacific Electric Railroad co-owner) Isaias W. Hellman, put together a syndicate to lay out the town of Bayside on the land between Anaheim Landing and Anaheim Bay and the eastern edge of Alamitos Bay.

=== Real estate development ===
The new town would be situated along the still not-announced Balboa Line of the Pacific Electric, which would run from Long Beach to Newport Beach. As there was already a town called Bayside in Northern California (by Eureka), Stanton's group instead called their new town Bay City. Due to many factors—including competition from other beach resort areas (Long Beach, Redondo Beach and Venice/Ocean Park/Santa Monica), some national financial crises, and the 1906 San Francisco Earthquake, which sent most investment dollars to the more lucrative rebuilding of San Francisco—Bay City failed miserably as a real estate investment.

In 1913, Stanton optioned the land to real estate promoter Guy M. Rush, who invested in building a renovated pier with pavilions on either side. Rush also re-branded the town as Seal Beach and marketed it via postcards and advertisements around the country. This too failed and by early 1915, Rush had let his options lapse. In 1915 Stanton tried again, arranging to obtain some amusements from the closing San Francisco Panama-Pacific International Exposition and rebuild them as part of new amusement area which would be called The Joy Zone.

As part of this plan, the Bayside Land Company led a campaign to incorporate the town (October 27, 1915) and then had the new city council approve legal drinking in the town. This made it different from the Pike at Long Beach, which was a "dry city." The Joy Zone, a beach-side amusement park built in 1916, was the first in Orange County. It achieved some brief popularity, but the US entry into World War I and the resulting restrictions on rubber and metal dramatically impacted the amusement area.

After the war, Prohibition impacted the town's value as an amusement resort. After 1920, the town's location on two bays, with many inlets to offload bootleg liquor, its small police department, and its location on the county line, allowed it to become a popular place for rumrunners, then gamblers. From 1928 to 1939, the town had as many as six gambling establishments on Main Street. In addition, most of Southern California's famous gambling ships (Johanna Smith, Rose Isle, Johanna Smith II, SS Caliente, SS Tango, Showboat, Mt. Baker) operated off the Seal Beach, just over the line from Long Beach.

With gambling being a misdemeanor, the trials were held in the town's municipal court and a Seal Beach jury never returned a guilty verdict, to the dismay of Orange County and Long Beach officials. But circa 1941, with significant pressure being put on the gamblers by State Attorney General Earl Warren, most of the Seal Beach gambling and ships ended. Their absence was soon filled by a former Los Angeles police detective named William L. Robertson.

=== World War II ===
In early 1944. during World War II, the Navy purchased most of the land around Anaheim Landing to construct the United States Navy's Naval Weapons Station Seal Beach for loading, unloading, and storing of ammunition for the Pacific Fleet, and especially those US Navy warships home-ported in Long Beach and San Diego. With closure of the Concord Naval Weapons Station in Northern California, it has become the primary source of munitions for a majority of the United States Pacific Fleet. The arrival of the Navy catalyzed a growth in population which eventually succeeded in shutting down Robertson's gambling operations.

Surfing has always had a presence in Seal Beach. Newspaper advertisements showing surfers were part of Guy M. Rush's "Seal Beach" campaign of 1913. The town hosted the mainland's first surfing competition—it was at a private gathering of the annual Minnesota Picnic. But its popularity really took off after the war with the arrival of legendary surfer Blackie August, who taught many of the local kids how to surf. August's son, Robert, was one of the pair of surfers featured in the classic surf film, Endless Summer. Local legends Jack Haley and Mike Haley were the winners of the first two national surfing championships.

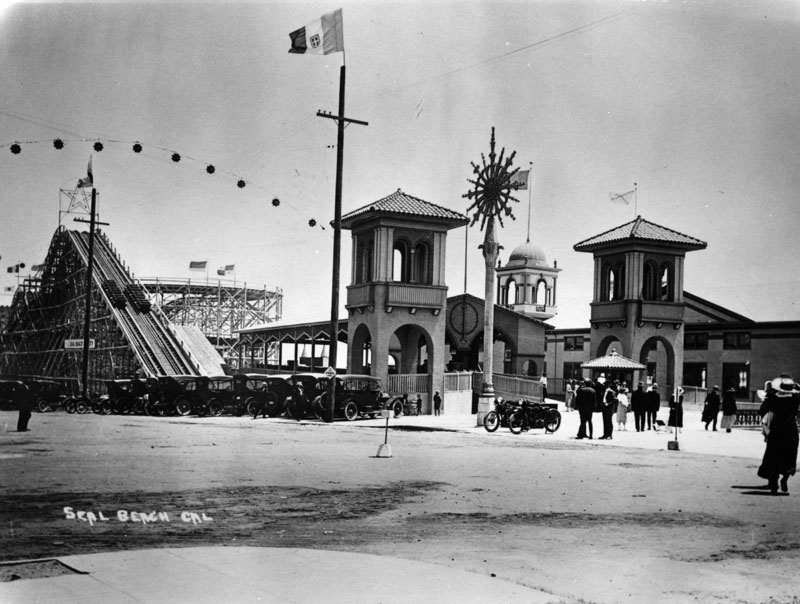
Seal Beach amusement park, 1920

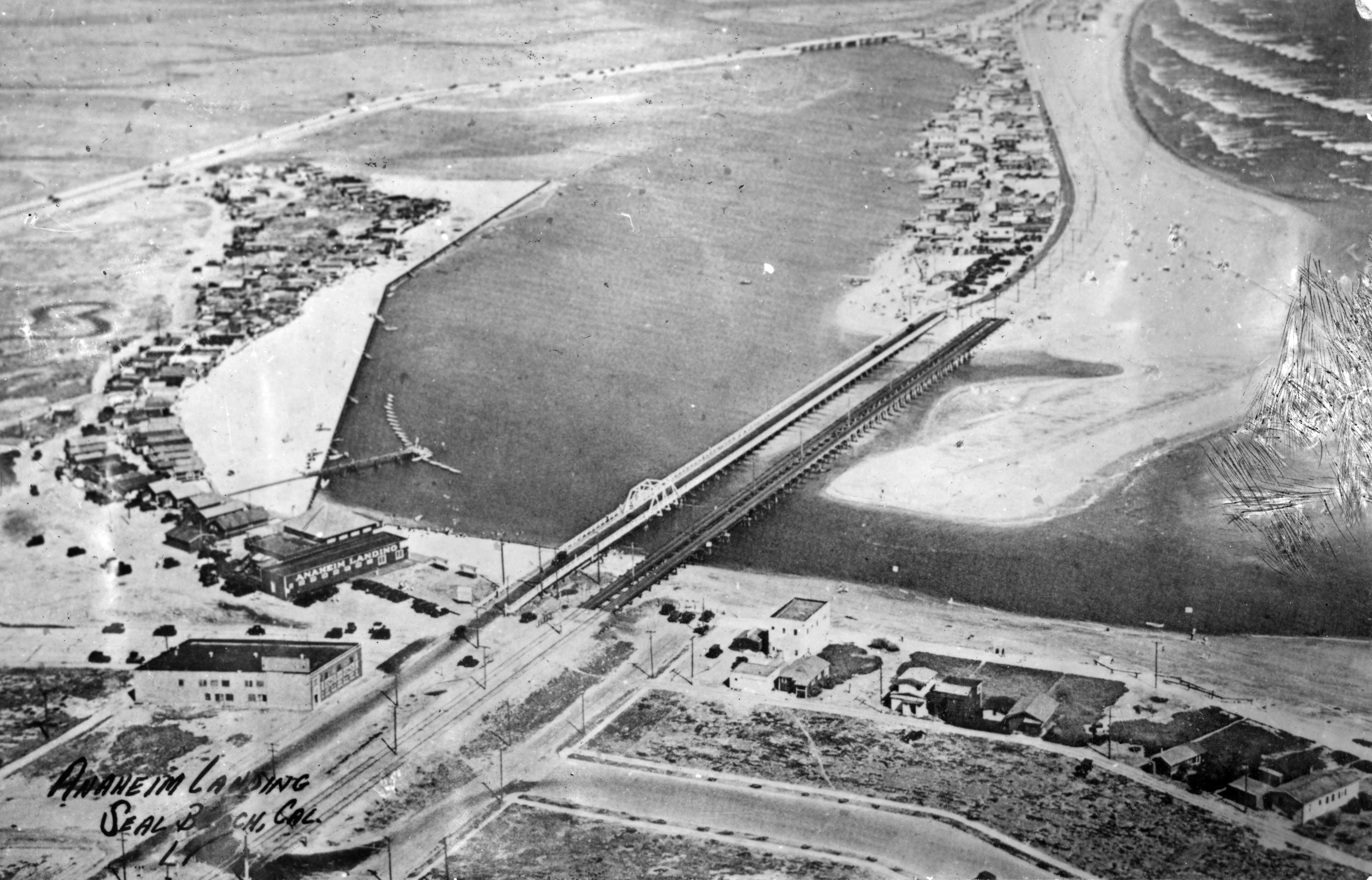
Anaheim Landing aerial photo, circa 1930s

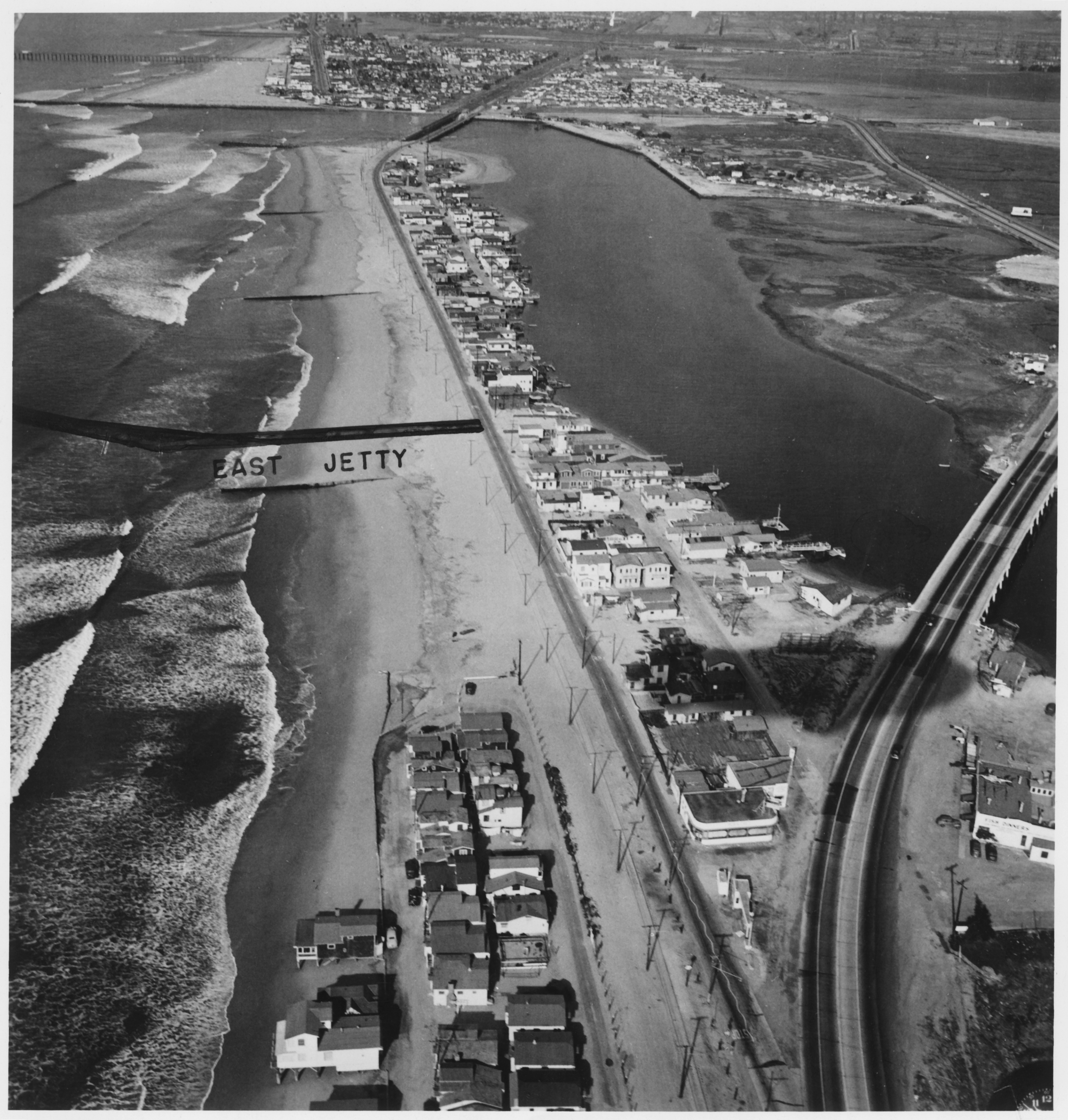
Naval Ammunition and Net Depot. Aerial view of Anaheim Bay, WW2 era

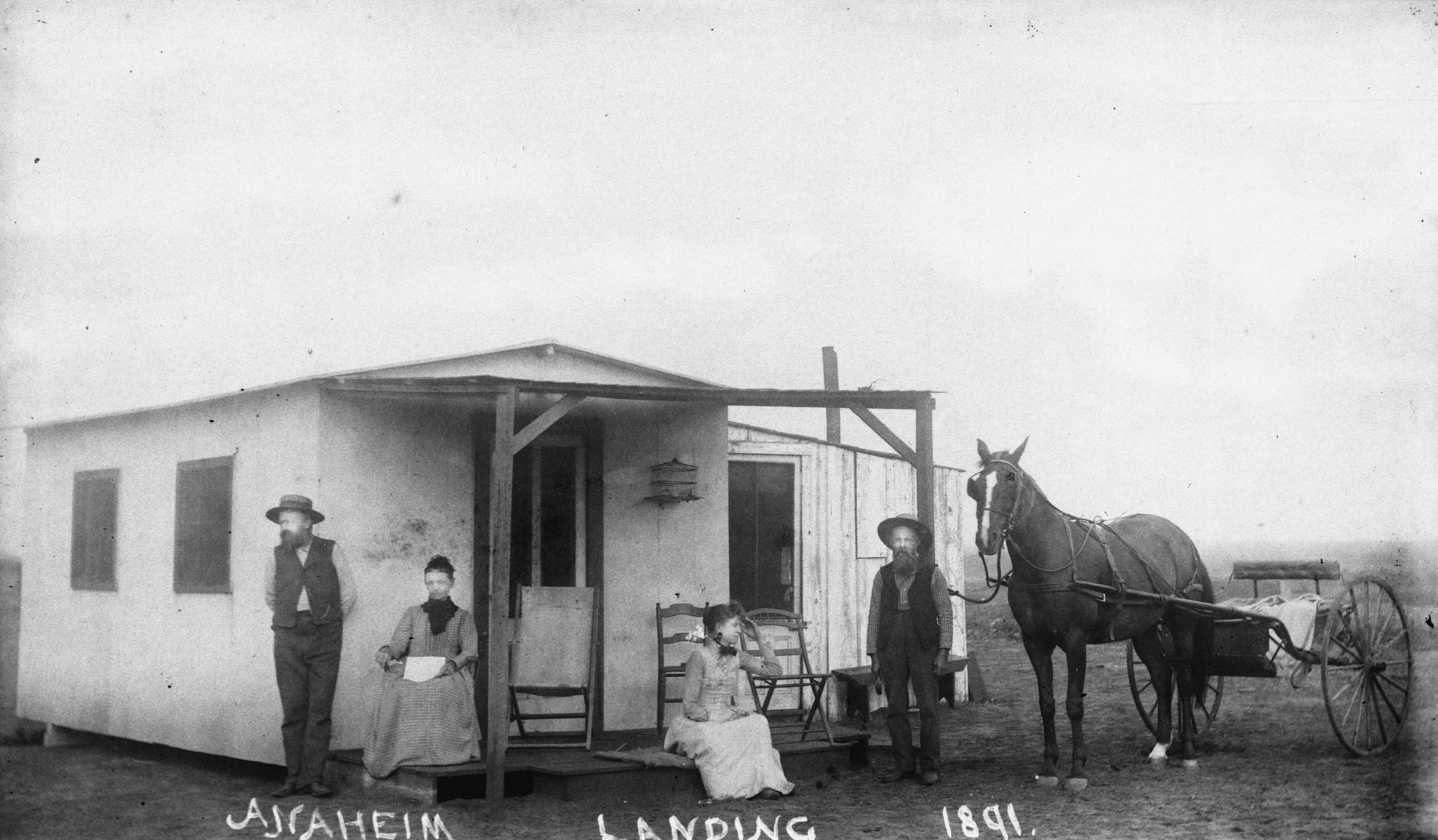
Anaheim Landing 1891

=== Mid to Late 20th century ===
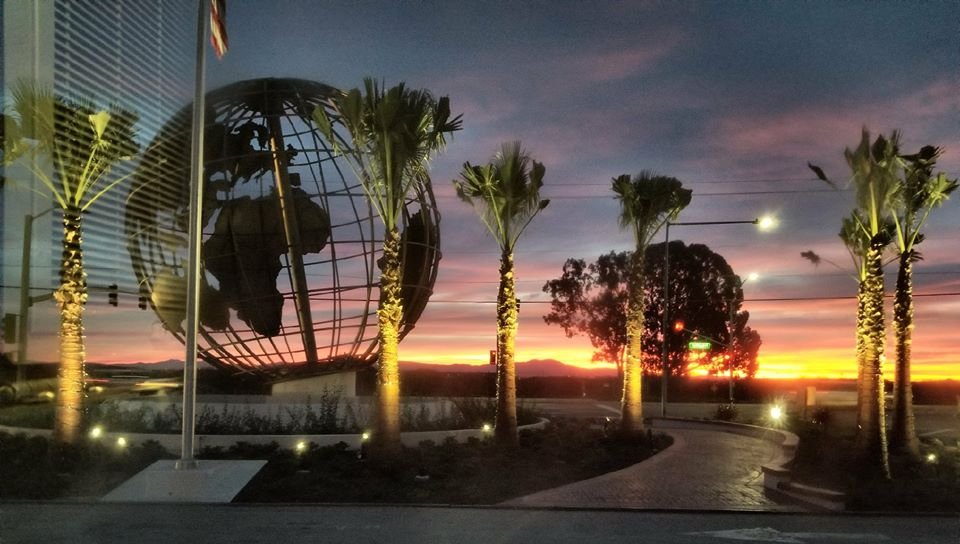
30-foot tall globe at entrance to Leisure World, Seal Beach. 2019 photo.

In 1962, Seal Beach opened Leisure World, one of the first age segregated communities in the U.S. that caters to people over 55.

=== 21st century ===
In 2002, a construction crew discovered the remnants of a large Tongva village and burial site while working on a project to construct a new gated community. The Heron Pointe project was picketed by members of the Tongva tribe who successfully mitigated development in the area. The tribal community, alongside the Los Cerritos Wetlands Land Trust, has continued to work to preserve the coastal environment.

=== 2011 shooting ===
The deadliest mass killing in Orange County history occurred in Seal Beach. On October 12, 2011, a mass shooting took place at the local Salon Meritage hair salon. Eight people inside the salon and one person in the parking lot were shot, and only one victim survived. The suspect in the shooting, 41-year-old Scott Evans Dekraai, was arrested without incident and charged with eight counts of murder and one count of attempted murder. Prior to the shooting, there had been only one murder in Seal Beach during the previous four years.

== Geography ==
According to the United States Census Bureau, the city has a total area of 11.8 square miles (31 km^{2}), of which 11.3 square miles (29 km^{2}) is land and 0.5 square miles (1.3 km^{2}) (4.51%) is water.

=== Climate ===
Seal Beach has a semi-arid climate (Köppen climate classification BSh) with Mediterranean characteristics.

Climate data for Seal Beach, California
Month	Jan	Feb	Mar	Apr	May	Jun	Jul	Aug	Sep	Oct	Nov	Dec	Year
Record high °F (°C)	91 (33)	91 (33)	97 (36)	104 (40)	101 (38)	107 (42)	109 (43)	104 (40)	110 (43)	107 (42)	97 (36)	89 (32)	110 (43)
Mean daily maximum °F (°C)	67 (19)	68 (20)	68 (20)	72 (22)	73 (23)	77 (25)	81 (27)	83 (28)	81 (27)	78 (26)	72 (22)	68 (20)	74 (23)
Mean daily minimum °F (°C)	46 (8)	48 (9)	50 (10)	53 (12)	57 (14)	61 (16)	64 (18)	65 (18)	63 (17)	58 (14)	51 (11)	46 (8)	55 (13)
Record low °F (°C)	20 (−7)	34 (1)	37 (3)	39 (4)	48 (9)	50 (10)	58 (14)	54 (12)	52 (11)	45 (7)	37 (3)	29 (−2)	20 (−7)
Average precipitation inches (mm)	2.98 (76)	3.04 (77)	2.50 (64)	0.65 (17)	0.24 (6.1)	0.08 (2.0)	0.02 (0.51)	0.11 (2.8)	0.24 (6.1)	0.39 (9.9)	1.15 (29)	1.75 (44)	13.14 (334)

== Demographics ==
Historical population
Census	Pop.	Note	%±
1920	669		—
1930	1,156		72.8%
1940	1,553		34.3%
1950	3,553		128.8%
1960	6,994		96.8%
1970	24,441		249.5%
1980	25,975		6.3%
1990	25,098		−3.4%
2000	24,157		−3.7%
2010	24,168		0.0%
2020	25,242		4.4%
2024 (est.)	24,421	▼	−3.3%
U.S. Decennial Census; 1860–1870 1880–1890; 1900 1910 1920; 1930 1940 1950; 1960 1970 1980; 1990 2000 2010; 2020

Seal Beach first appeared as a city in the 1910 U.S. census which was coterminous with the newly formed Seal Beach Township.

=== Racial and ethnic composition ===
Seal Beach city, California – Racial and Ethnic Composition Note: the US Census treats Hispanic/Latino as an ethnic category. This table excludes Latinos from the racial categories and assigns them to a separate category. Hispanics/Latinos may be of any race.
Race / Ethnicity (NH = Non-Hispanic)	Pop 1980	Pop 1990	Pop 2000	Pop 2010	Pop 2020	% 1980	% 1990	% 2000	% 2010	% 2020
White alone (NH)	24,021	22,513	20,372	18,580	16,814	92.48%	89.71%	84.33%	76.88%	66.61%
Black or African American alone (NH)	262	244	329	255	370	1.01%	0.97%	1.36%	1.06%	1.47%
Native American or Alaska Native alone (NH)	72	48	54	38	53	0.28%	0.19%	0.22%	0.16%	0.21%
Asian alone (NH)	681	1,025	1,363	2,273	3,624	2.62%	4.08%	5.64%	9.40%	14.36%
Native Hawaiian or Pacific Islander alone (NH)	681	1,025	37	52	46	2.62%	4.08%	0.15%	0.22%	0.18%
Other race alone (NH)	38	15	21	62	91	0.15%	0.06%	0.09%	0.26%	0.36%
Mixed race or Multiracial (NH)	x	x	427	577	1,091	x	x	1.77%	2.39%	4.32%
Hispanic or Latino (any race)	901	1,253	1,554	2,331	3,153	3.47%	4.99%	6.43%	9.64%	12.49%
Total	25,975	25,098	24,157	24,168	25,242	100.00%	100.00%	100.00%	100.00%	100.00%

=== 2020 census ===
As of the 2020 census, Seal Beach had a population of 25,242 and a population density of 2,240.1 inhabitants per square mile (864.9/km^{2}).

The median age was 60.8 years. About 12.2% of residents were under the age of 18, 4.4% were from 18 to 24, 15.7% were from 25 to 44, 24.5% were from 45 to 64, and 43.2% were 65 years of age or older. For every 100 females, there were 80.1 males, and for every 100 females age 18 and over, there were 76.9 males age 18 and over.

The census reported that 99.0% of the population lived in households, 0.3% lived in non-institutionalized group quarters, and 0.7% were institutionalized. 100.0% of residents lived in urban areas, while 0.0% lived in rural areas.

There were 13,369 households, of which 13.8% included children under the age of 18, 39.5% were married-couple households, 3.8% were cohabiting couple households, 38.7% had a female householder with no spouse or partner present, and 18.0% had a male householder with no spouse or partner present. About 46.5% of all households were one-person households, and 33.9% were one-person households with a resident aged 65 or older. The average household size was 1.87, and there were 6,497 families (48.6% of all households).

There were 14,645 housing units at an average density of 1,299.7 units per square mile (501.8 units/km^{2}), of which 13,369 (91.3%) were occupied and 8.7% were vacant. Of the occupied units, 73.9% were owner-occupied and 26.1% were occupied by renters. The homeowner vacancy rate was 1.9% and the rental vacancy rate was 5.0%.

=== Income and poverty ===
In 2023, the US Census Bureau estimated that the median household income was $83,045, and the per capita income was $67,571. About 4.0% of families and 5.5% of the population were below the poverty line.

=== 2010 census ===
The 2010 United States census reported that Seal Beach had a population of 24,168. The population density was 1,853.3 inhabitants per square mile (715.6/km^{2}). The racial makeup of Seal Beach was 20,154 (83.4%) White (76.9% Non-Hispanic White), 279 (1.2%) African American, 65 (0.3%) Native American, 2,309 (9.6%) Asian, 58 (0.2%) Pacific Islander, 453 (1.9%) from other races, and 850 (3.5%) from two or more races. There were 2,331 Hispanic or Latino residents, of any race (9.6%).

The Census reported that 23,943 people (99.1% of the population) lived in households, 22 (0.1%) lived in non-institutionalized group quarters, and 203 (0.8%) were institutionalized.

There were 13,017 households, out of which 1,866 (14.3%) had children under the age of 18 living in them, 4,891 (37.6%) were opposite-sex married couples living together, 788 (6.1%) had a female householder with no husband present, 283 (2.2%) had a male householder with no wife present. There were 383 (2.9%) unmarried opposite-sex partnerships, and 66 (0.5%) same-sex married couples or partnerships. Of the households, 6,312 (48.5%) were made up of individuals, and 4,340 (33.3%) had someone living alone who was 65 years of age or older. The average household size was 1.84. There were 5,962 families (45.8% of all households); the average family size was 2.65.

In Seal Beach there were 3,151 people (13.0%) under the age of 18, 1,176 people (4.9%) aged 18 to 24, 4,076 people (16.9%) aged 25 to 44, 6,513 people (26.9%) aged 45 to 64, and 9,252 people (38.3%) who were 65 years of age or older. The median age was 57.3 years. For every 100 females, there were 78.8 males. For every 100 females age 18 and over, there were 76.3 males.

There were 14,558 housing units at an average density of 1,116.4 per square mile (431.0/km^{2}), of which 9,713 (74.6%) were owner-occupied, and 3,304 (25.4%) were occupied by renters. The homeowner vacancy rate was 2.0%; the rental vacancy rate was 4.4%. 17,689 people (73.2% of the population) lived in owner-occupied housing units and 6,254 people (25.9%) lived in rental housing units.

During 2009–2013, Seal Beach had a median household income of $51,242, with 9.9% of the population living below the federal poverty line.

== Economy ==
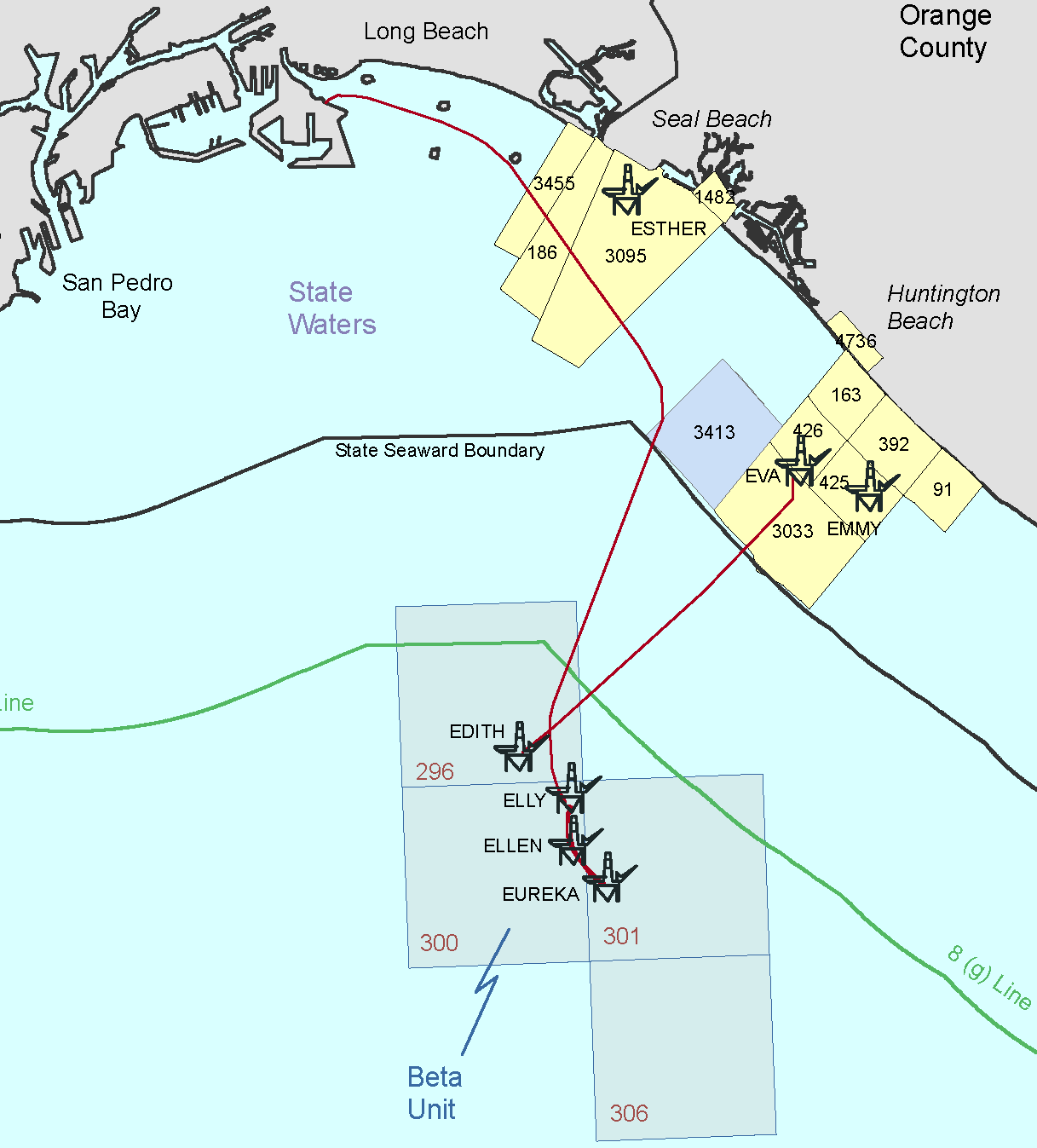
San Pedro Bay Outer Continental Shelf Operations Map with oil platforms as of 2012- Edith, Elly, Ellen, Eureka (federal leases) and Ester, Emmy, Eva (state leases). An oil spill occurred near here in 2021.

The major employer in Seal Beach is Boeing, employing roughly 1,000 people. Its facility was originally built to manufacture the second stage of the Saturn V rocket for NASA's Apollo crewed space flight missions to the Moon and for the Skylab program. Boeing Homeland Security & Services (airport security, etc.) is based in Seal Beach and Boeing Space & Intelligence Systems (satellite systems and classified programs) is headquartered in Seal Beach.

=== Top employers ===
According to the city's 2009 Comprehensive Annual Financial Report, the top employers in the city are:

#	Employer	# of employees
1	Boeing	1,000
2	MagTek	250
3	Siemens Medical Solutions	200
4	Target	200
5	First Team Real Estate	150
6	Farmers & Merchants Bank of Long Beach	150
7	Bixby Ranch Company	135
8	Kohl's	121
9	Spaghettini Grill and Lounge	105
10	Albertsons	100
11	Custom Building Products	96
12	Autism Partnership	95
13	P2F Holdings	85
14	Health Net	75
15	Original Parts Group	75
16	BakerCorp	71

== Arts and culture ==
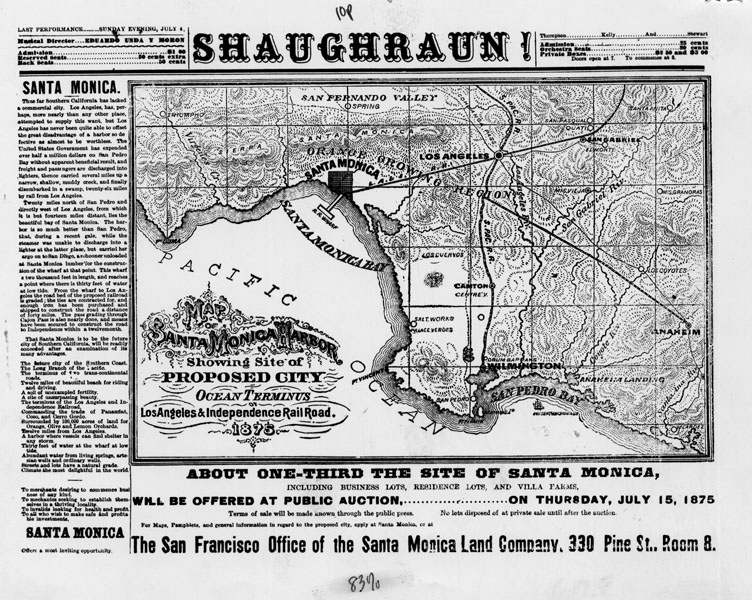
"Anaheim Landing" on an 1875 map.

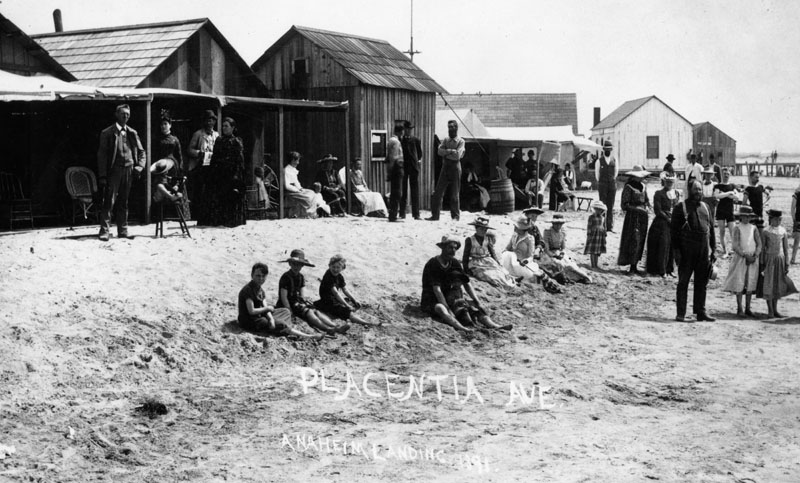
Anaheim Landing (now Seal Beach), 1891.

=== Annual cultural events ===
The Lions Club Pancake Breakfast in April and its Fish Fry (started in 1943) in July are two of the biggest events in Seal Beach. There has been a Rough Water Swim the same weekend as the Fish Fry since the 1960s. The Seal Beach Chamber of Commerce sponsors many events, including: a Classic Car Show in April, a Summer Concert series once every week in July and August, the Christmas Parade in December along with Santa and the Reindeer. Also in the fall is the Kite Festival in September. The Taste for Los Al, which since 2001 has been benefitting activities at Los Alamitos High School (home high school for Seal Beach students), takes place every October and has one of the largest silent auctions in the nation, often having over 100 tables.

=== Music ===
The record label Mash Down Babylon Records is based in Seal Beach, operated out of a garage known as The Elizabethan. The label was founded by Matt Embree, lead vocalist and guitarist in the Seal Beach-based progressive rock/post-hardcore band RX Bandits.

=== Other points of interest ===
On Electric Avenue where the railroad tracks used to run, there is the Red Car Museum which features a restored Pacific Electric Railway Red Car. The Balboa Line once passed through Seal Beach going south to the Balboa Peninsula in Newport Beach. Going north into Long Beach a rider could then take the Red Cars through much of Los Angeles County. Anderson Street Water Tower is a restored 1892 water tower that is being rented for overnight stays.

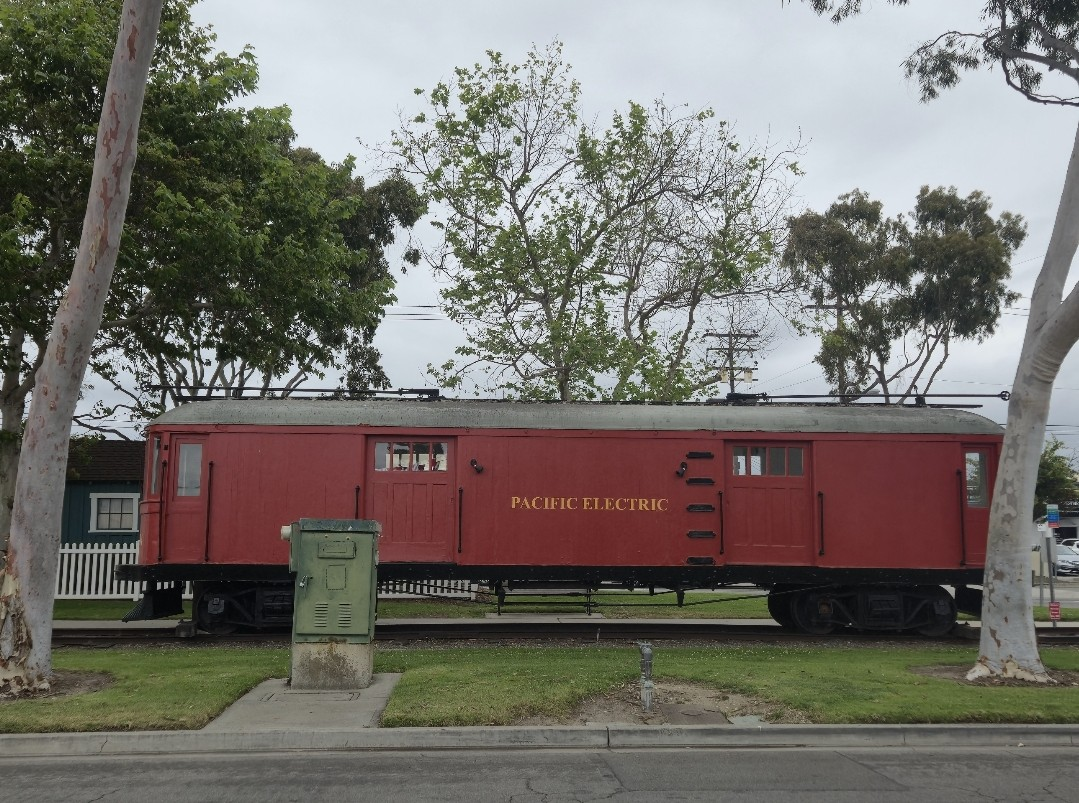
Pacific Electric Rail Car

Seal Beach is also home to the Bay Theatre, which was a popular venue for independent film and revival screenings. It was closed in 2012 but was purchased in 2017 by Paul Dunlap who is currently restoring it.

The Seal Beach National Wildlife Refuge is located on part of the Naval Weapons Station Seal Beach. Much of the refuge's 911 acres (3.69 km^{2}) is the remnant of the saltwater marsh in the Anaheim Bay estuary (the rest of the marsh became the bayside community of Huntington Harbour, which is part of Huntington Beach). Three endangered species, the Ridgway's light-footed rail, the California least tern, and the Belding's Savannah sparrow, can be found nesting in the refuge. With the loss and degradation of coastal wetlands in California, the remaining habitat, including the Bolsa Chica Ecological Reserve in Huntington Beach and Upper Newport Bay in Newport Beach, has become much more important for migrating and wintering shorebirds, waterfowl, and seabirds. Although the refuge is a great place for birdwatching, because it is part of the weapons station, access is limited and usually restricted to once-a-month tours.

== Parks and recreation ==
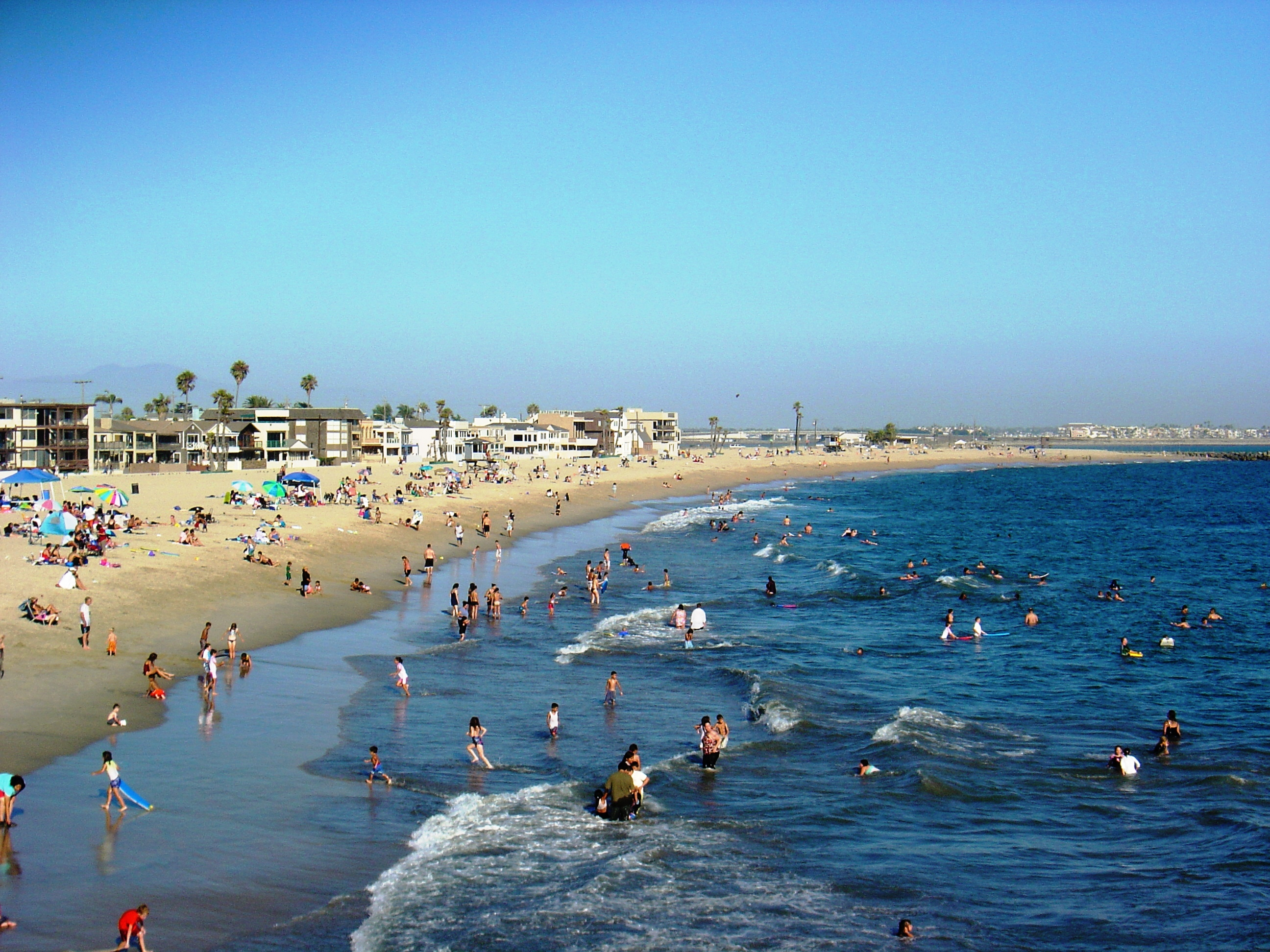
Seal Beach on a crowded summer afternoon

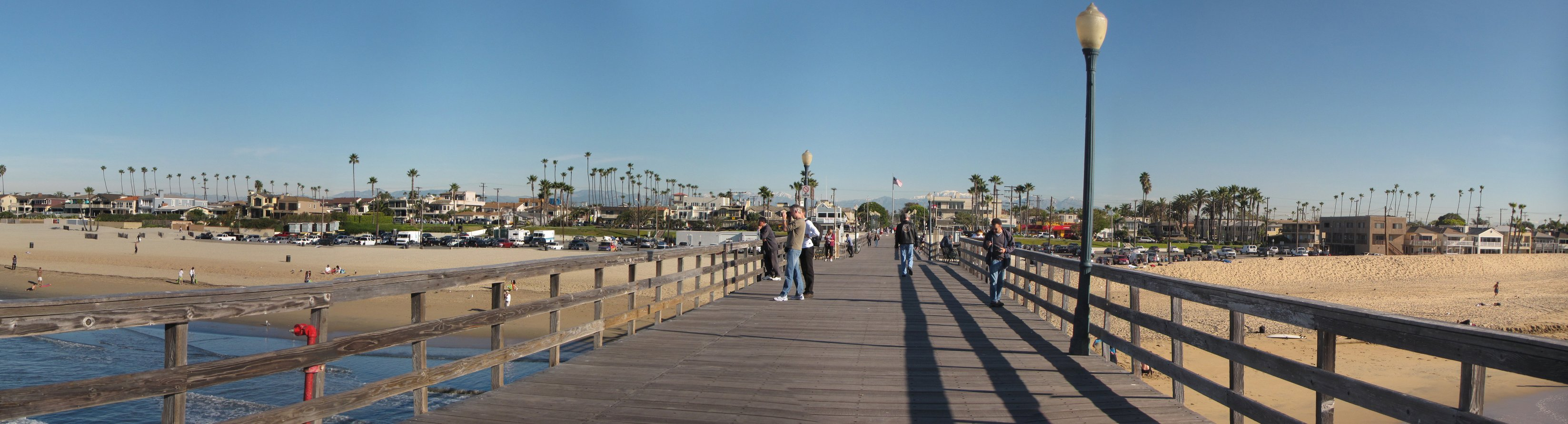
Seal Beach Pier

The second longest wooden pier in California (the longest is in Oceanside) is located in Seal Beach and is used for fishing and sightseeing. The pier has required repairs following storms in 1935 and 1983.

== Government ==
The city is administered under a council-manager form of government, and is governed by a five-member city council serving four-year alternating terms. The mayor and mayor pro tempore are chosen by and from the council.

Seal Beach's municipal jail offers a program in which offenders who would normally go to county jails could stay at Seal Beach's jail for a fee.

=== State, federal, and county representation ===
In the California State Senate, Seal Beach is in the 36th senatorial district, represented by Republican Tony Strickland. in the California State Assembly, Seal Beach is split between the 70th Assembly district, represented by Republican Tri Ta, and the 72nd Assembly district, represented by Republican Diane Dixon.

In the United States House of Representatives, Seal Beach is in California's 47th congressional district, represented by Democrat Dave Min.

In the Orange County Board of Supervisors, Seal Beach is in the first district represented by Janet Nguyen since 2024.

=== Crime ===
2023 Uniform Crime Report data
	Aggravated Assault	Homicide	Rape	Robbery	Burglary	Larceny Theft	Motor Vehicle Theft	Arson
Seal Beach	75	1	6	13	107	504	47	2

== Education ==
Seal Beach is almost entirely in the Los Alamitos Unified School District, and a small portion outside of that district is on the reservation of Seal Beach Naval Weapons Station.

McGaugh Elementary School is located in Seal Beach.

== Infrastructure ==
=== Transportation ===
Orange County Transportation Authority operates bus transportation throughout Seal Beach.

=== Water Services ===
Water in Seal Beach is supplied by the City of Seal Beach Utilities Division, which sources its water from the Municipal Water District of Orange County via Metropolitan Water District of Southern California, importing water from Northern California and the Colorado River. Additionally, groundwater is pumped from 2 local wells tapped into an underground aquifer.

== Notable people ==
- Andrija Artuković, Nazi collaborator convicted of war crimes.
- Robert August, one of the two surfers in Bruce Brown's classic surf film The Endless Summer, grew up in Seal Beach.
- Jimmy Bennett, actor, born in Seal Beach. Portrayed Captain Kirk (during his childhood) in Star Trek.
- Sean Collins, founder of Surfline.
- Susan Egan, actress/singer, born in Seal Beach. Known for theater (e.g. Belle in Beauty and the Beast and voice work (e.g. Megara in Hercules and Lin in the English dub of Spirited Away).
- Matt Embree, vocalist/guitarist of the band RX Bandits and founder of the Mash Down Babylon Records record label, both of which are also based in Seal Beach.
- Steve Goodman, singer-songwriter and author of "City of New Orleans", "A Dying Cubs Fan's Last Request" and "You Never Even Call Me By My Name" made Seal Beach his home from 1980 until his death in 1984.
- Bill Green, former U.S. and NCAA record holder in Track and Field, 5th place in the hammer throw at the 1984 Olympic Games lived in Seal Beach from 1988 to 1993
- Jack Haley, Jr. - former NBA player
- Chris Kluwe, punter for the Minnesota Vikings of the NFL
- Greg Knapp, New York Jets pass game specialist.
- Pat McCormick, a two-time Olympic platform and springboard gold medal diver (1952 & 1956).
- Jack Snow, Notre Dame and Los Angeles Rams football player
- Clayton Snyder, actor who played Ethan Craft in the Lizzie McGuire TV show and film.
- Michelle Steel, U.S. Congresswoman from California's 48th district from 2021 to 2023 and 45th district from 2023 to 2025 (resident of Surfside Colony), former Chair of the Orange County Board of Supervisors.
- Mel Steiner, Major League Baseball umpire
- Randy Stonehill, Grammy nominated singer/songwriter resides in Seal Beach with wife Sandi
- Chad Wackerman, rock and jazz drummer who has worked with Frank Zappa, Barbra Streisand, James Taylor and many others
- Bill Ward, drummer, solo artist, and occasional lead vocalist of hard rock/heavy metal band, Black Sabbath.
- Bob Welch, professional baseball player

== See also ==
- List of beaches in California
- Southern California
