= William Beaumont Army Medical Center =

- Defense Health Agency
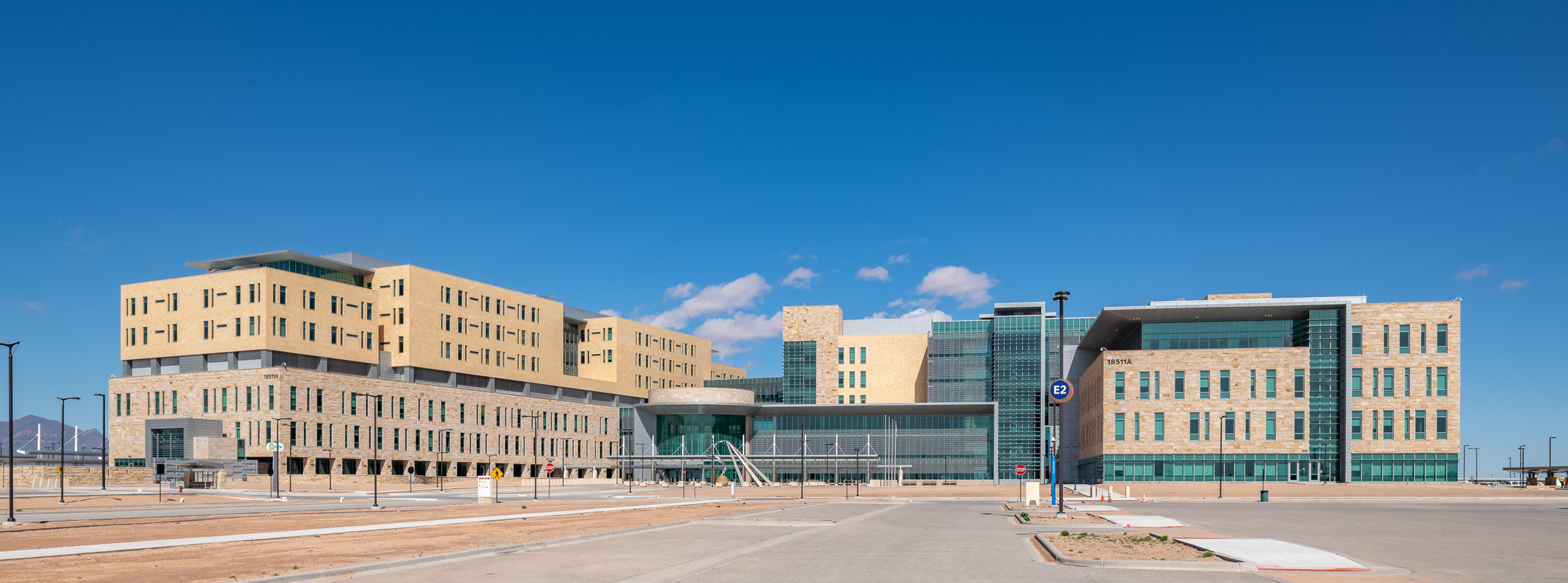

- Location of hospital on map of Texas

Geography
- Location: El Paso, Texas, United States
- Coordinates: 31.8327°N 106.3253°W

Organization
- Care system: Tricare
- Type: Teaching hospital, General
- Affiliated university: Paul L. Foster School of Medicine

Services
- Emergency department: Level II Trauma Center

Helipads
- Helipad: 31.8357°N 106.3275°W

History
- Founded: 1849

Links
- Website: william-beaumont.tricare.mil
- Lists: Hospitals in Texas
- Other links
- Fort Bliss Post Hospital (1893)
- U.S. National Register of Historic Places
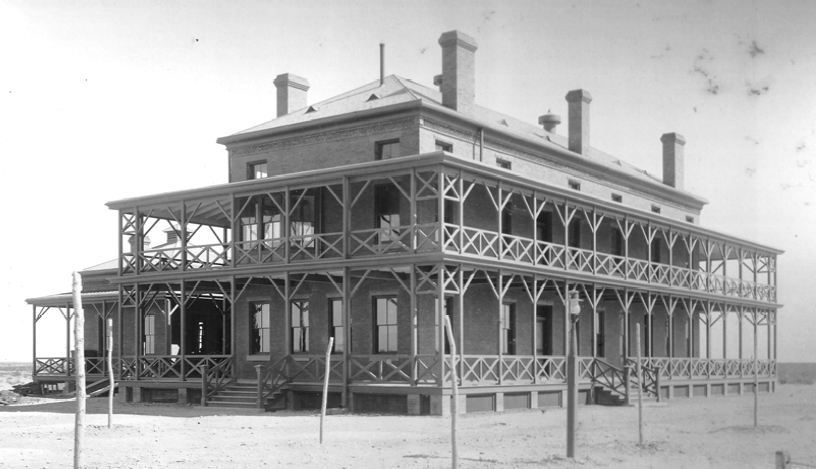
- Photograph of the Fort Bliss Post Hospital in 1893
- Location: El Paso, Texas
- Built: 1893
- Architect: US Army
- Architectural style: Greek Revival, Original porch was Stick Style
- NRHP reference No.: 98000427
- Added to NRHP: February 23, 1972
- New Fort Bliss Post Hospital (1904)
- U.S. National Register of Historic Places
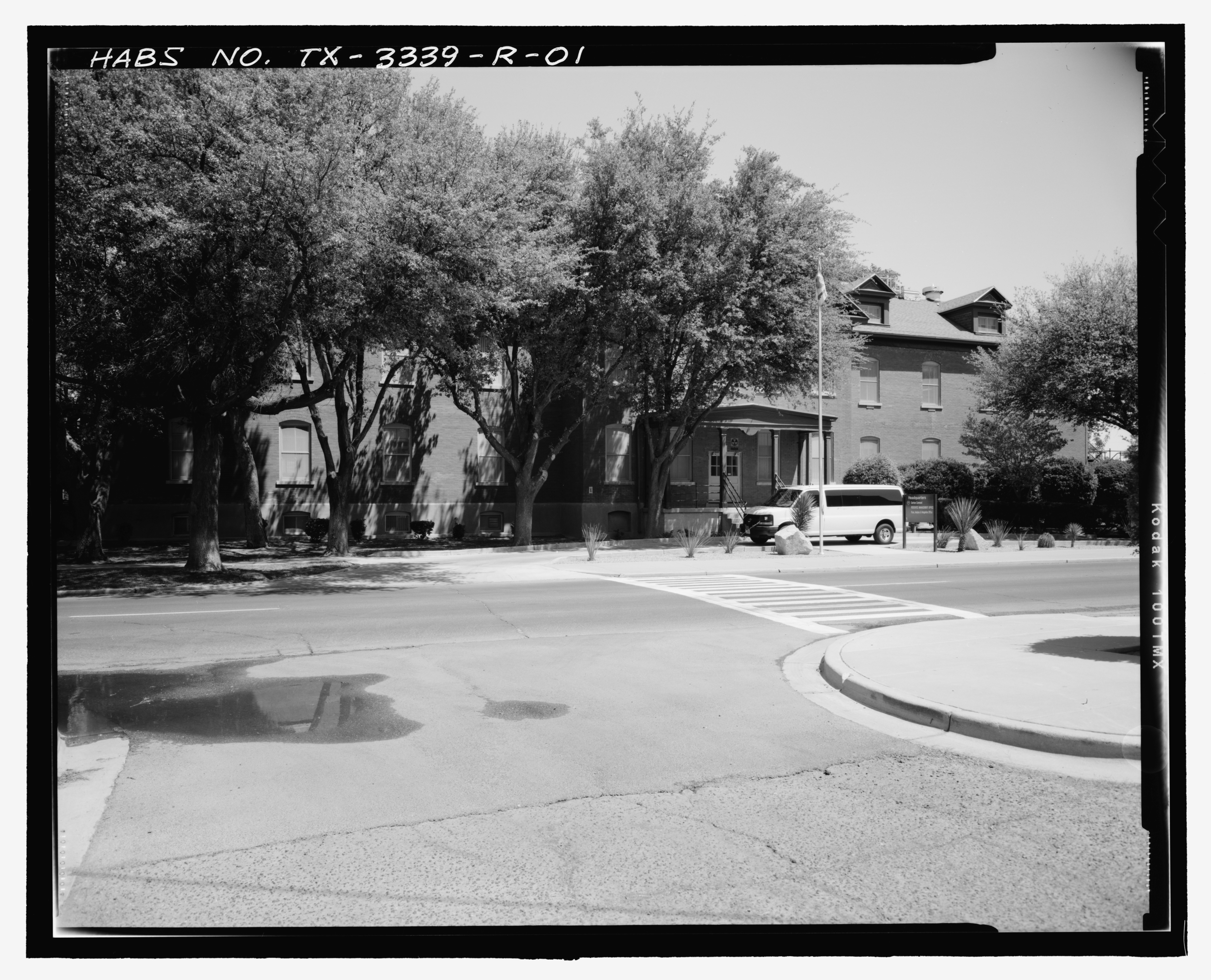
- Photograph of the 1904 Fort Bliss Post Hospital
- Location: Pershing Road, El Paso, Texas
- Built: 1904
- Architect: US Army
- Architectural style: Colonial Revival
- NRHP reference No.: 98000427
- Added to NRHP: 1998
William Beaumont Army Medical Center
- The WBAMC Distinctive Unit Insignia
- Active: 1849 – present
- Country: United States
- Branch: United States Army
- Type: Hospital
- Role: Inpatient and Outpatient Services; Graduate Medical Education; Level III Trauma Center
- Size: over 150 beds
- Part of: U.S. Army Medical Command (MEDCOM)
- Garrison/HQ: Fort Bliss
- Motto: "First to Care"
Commanders
- Notable commanders: Maj. Gen. (Dr.) Charles C. Pixley; M. A. W. Shockley

William Beaumont Army Medical Center is a Department of Defense medical facility located in Fort Bliss, Texas. It provides comprehensive care to all beneficiaries including active duty military, their family members, and retirees. The hospital is located in the Central/Northeastern part of El Paso, and provides emergency department services for Northeast El Paso. The current 1.1-million-square-foot, 6-building medical complex opened July 10, 2021, on East Fort Bliss. WBAMC is affiliated with the Paul L. Foster School of Medicine which is also located in El Paso, Texas. WBAMC is also a participating hospital for medical residents from the Uniformed Services University of the Health Sciences (USU) and nursing students from the University of Texas at El Paso School of Nursing and the El Paso Community College Nursing School.

== History ==
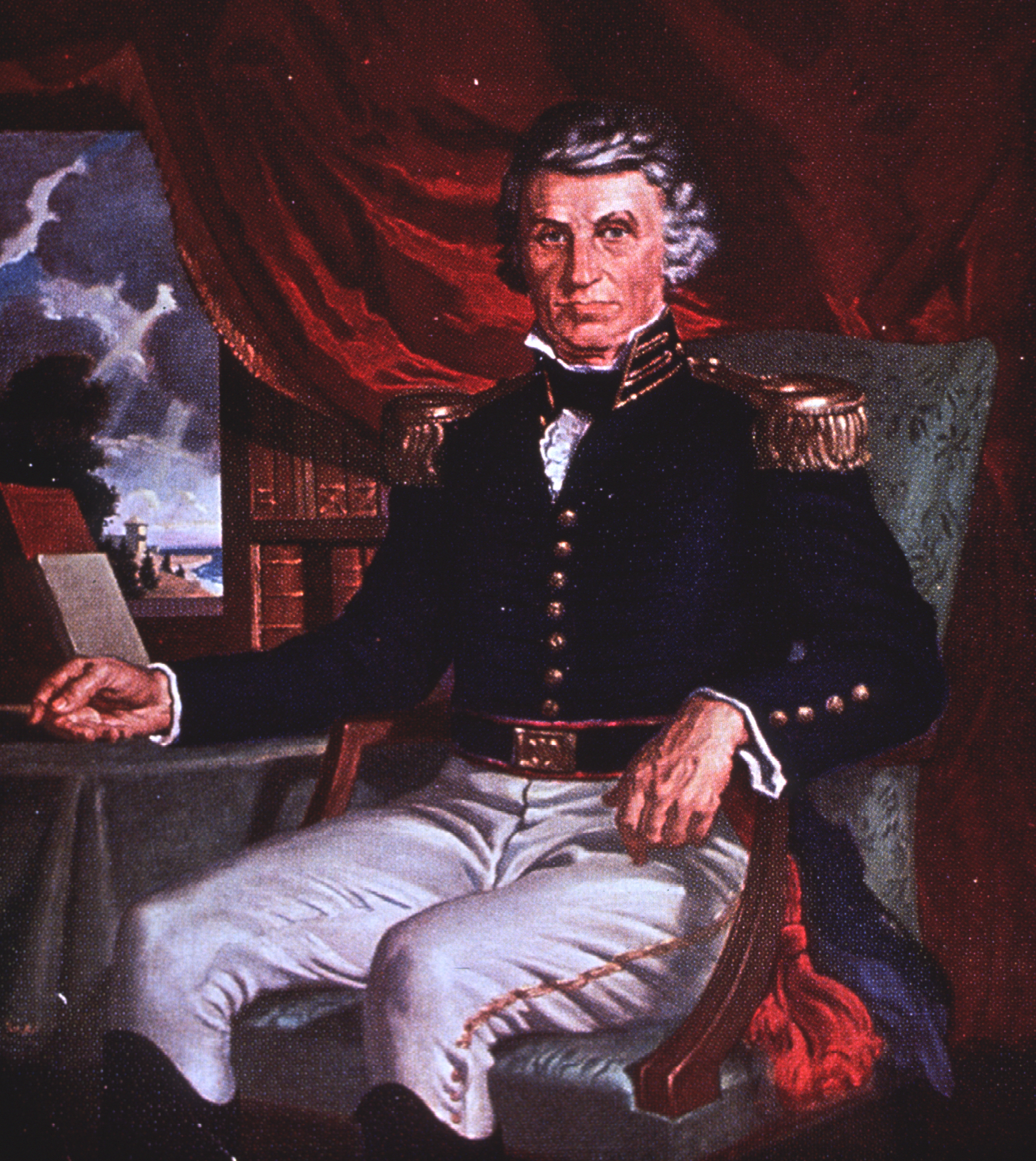
Portrait of William Beaumont in US Army dress uniform. The hospital was named in honor of William Beaumont in 1921.

The William Beaumont Army Medical Center (WBAMC), formerly the William Beaumont General Hospital (WBGH), is currently situated northwest of Fort Bliss' main cantonment area, between Fred Wilson Road and Hayes Avenue. The hospital had its beginnings in Fort Bliss during the 1850s. After several earlier moves, Fort Bliss moved to its permanent location at La Noria Mesa in 1893. The hospital is named for Army surgeon William Beaumont (1785–1853), the "Father of Gastric Physiology".

=== Early years (1849–1892) ===
From its beginnings in 1849, the medical units that supported the Army installation in El Paso have moved several times. In January 1854, "The Post of El Paso del Norte", was established on Magoffin's Ranch. This installation at Magoffin's Ranch formally became known as Fort Bliss on 8 March 1854, in honor of Lt. Col. William Wallace Smith Bliss a veteran of the Mexican–American War (1846–1848) who was cited for gallantry in action. In 1868, the Army installation was moved to Camp Concordia. Though the hospital was rudimentary in the 1860s, it provided care for troops afflicted with malaria and dysentery. The fort and its hospital moved back to downtown El Paso in 1878; then to Hart's Mill in the 1880s; and finally to La Noria Mesa in 1893 on land donated by El Paso citizens. The La Noria Mesa site remains as the permanent station for Fort Bliss and its medical units.

Remains of the original 1880s Army Hospital located at Hart's Mill were uncovered by archaeologists in 2012 near the main campus of the University of Texas at El Paso. The Army used military labor to construct the post hospital at Hart's Mill, which was completed in December 1880.

==== Civil War – under control of Confederate Army (1861–1862) ====
Fort Bliss was directed to surrender to Confederate forces on 31 Mar 1861 after Texas withdrew from the Union, to include the garrison hospital. Fort Bliss and the hospital remained Confederate until 20 Aug 1862. The retreating Confederate troops destroyed all of Fort Bliss, except for the hospital, which housed their sick and wounded.

=== Formative years (1893–1898) ===
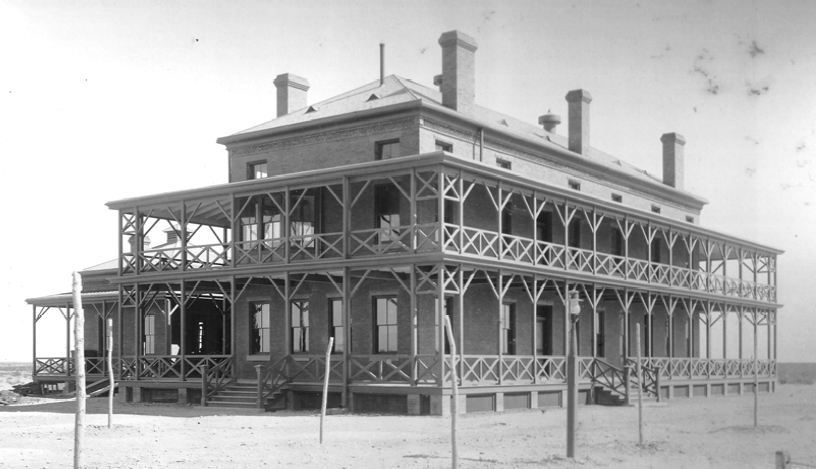
The Fort Bliss Post Hospital was constructed in 1893.

The 1890s saw the establishment of a permanent hospital at Fort Bliss in support of a permanent regimental post along the border. Twenty-nine buildings and a parade ground are extant from this period on Fort Bliss and contribute to the Fort Bliss Main Post Historic District, to include the Fort Bliss Fort Hospital, completed in 1893. This building, now known as Building 8, is currently the location of the Fort Bliss Inspector General's Office. It was added to the National Register of Historic Places on February 23, 1972.

=== Spanish–American War (1898–1902) ===
During this period, the hospital supported a skeletal garrison at Fort Bliss, containing never more than 100 soldiers. It was not until 1902 and the end of the Philippine Insurrection that the hospital supported a full complement of troops at Fort Bliss. By 1902 the hospital, along with all the buildings on Fort Bliss, had fallen into disrepair. Lieutenant Colonel H.H. Adams, of the 18th Infantry Regiment, commanded the post in 1902 and reported the hospital steward's quarters needed "extensive repairs."

=== New Fort Bliss post hospital (1903–1919) ===
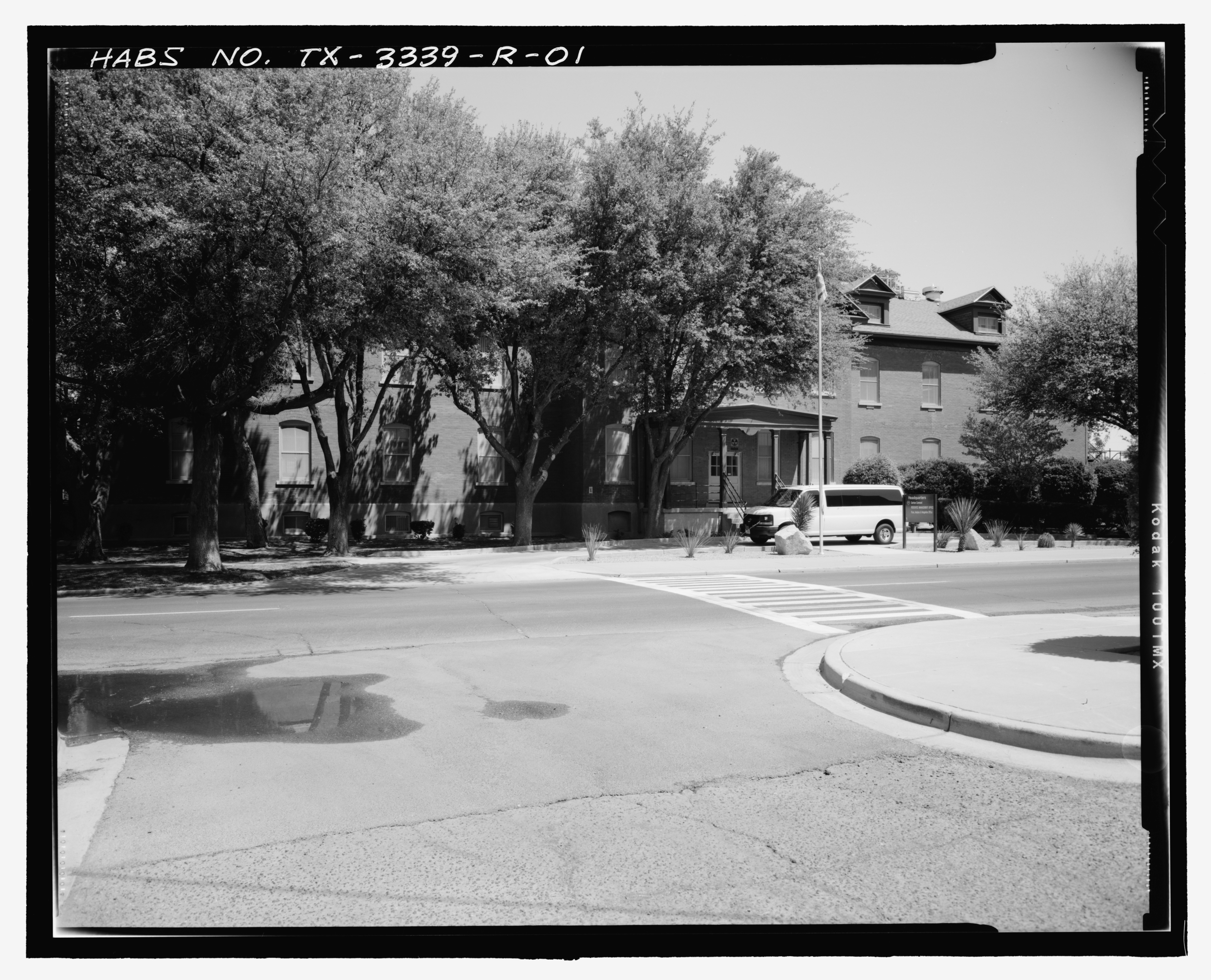
The new Post Hospital building was completed in 1904.

In his 1903 report, the inspector general found the Fort Bliss hospital was one of several in the Department of Texas showing "defective construction due to inferior material or poor workmanship, or both." The commander of the Department of Texas agreed in the same year, "A new hospital at Fort Bliss is undoubtedly needed." In the summer of 1904, a new department commander, Brigadier General Jesse M. Lee, toured Fort Bliss and wrote a report generally critical of the post. Lee reported a new hospital was being built.

On 1 December 1917, field hospital company 3 departed Fort Bliss, then sailed from Hoboken on 5 December, and arrived at Saint-Nazaire on 22 December, among the last elements of the 1st Infantry Division to arrive in France and later the Western Front.

The first Army dental training school was established at the Fort Bliss Post Hospital in September 1916 by Captain Robert T. Oliver. The dental school at the Fort Bliss Post Hospital served as a model for similar efforts in the mobilization camps after the April 6, 1917, declaration of war against Germany.

=== William Beaumont General Hospital (1920–1939) ===
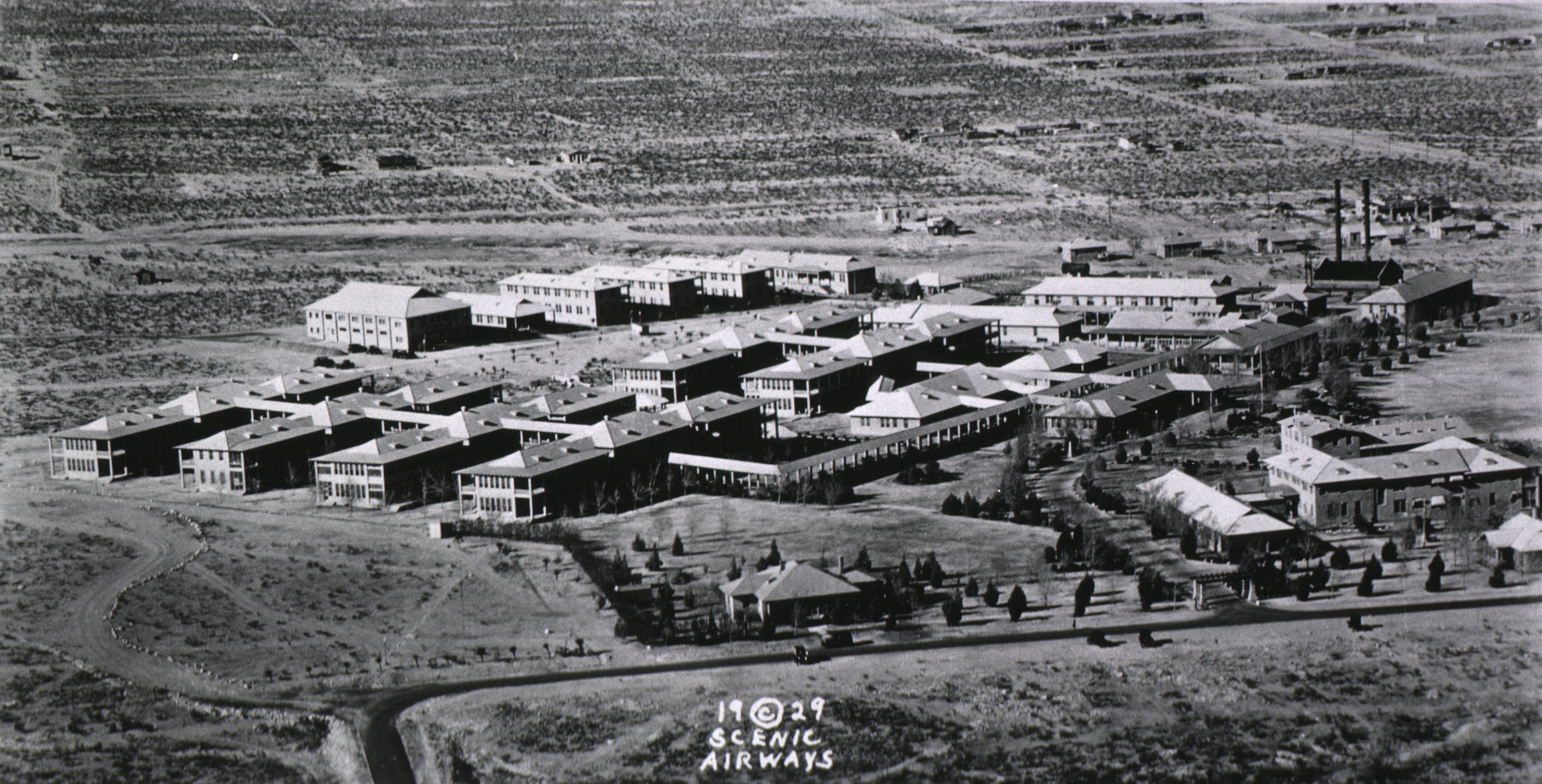
Aerial view of the William Beaumont General Hospital in 1929.

General Orders No. 40 of the War Department, June 26, 1920, stipulated that this new hospital at Fort Bliss be named after Major William Beaumont, one of the most famous surgeons of the "Old Army". Construction for the new hospital began in 1920 on a site at the foot of the Franklin Mountains. The location was selected for its high altitude and dry desert air, which were considered therapeutic for soldiers suffering from respiratory ailments such as tuberculosis. This new hospital was opened on July 1, 1921 and was completed in 1922. The original complex featured 48 tile-and-stucco buildings connected by glass-enclosed corridors, consisted of 41 buildings and 403 beds, with an emergency reserve of 100 additional beds. The new hospital buildings were made of tile and stucco.

In September 1922, Major (later Brigadier General) M. A. W. Shockley, a veteran of the Spanish–American War and former medical aide to General John J. Pershing, assumed command. Under Shockley's leadership, the hospital transitioned from a specialized convalescent center for World War I veterans into the primary medical hub for the Eighth Corps Area, providing health care to soldiers stationed at posts in Arizona, New Mexico, and western Texas. Shockley oversaw the modernization of the hospital's clinical departments, including the expansion of early X-ray diagnostics and thoracic surgical techniques. During this period, the hospital became a pioneer in the use of artificial pneumothorax, a procedure involving the deliberate collapse of a lung to treat tuberculosis which was a leading cause of disability among border-stationed troops at the time.

Following Shockley's departure in 1925 to serve as Assistant Surgeon General, the hospital continued to evolve into a teaching institution. In 1932, it began formal training programs for nurses and interns. By the late 1930s, the facility had shifted its focus from regional border support to preparing for the mass mobilization of World War II.

=== World War II and after (1940–1968) ===
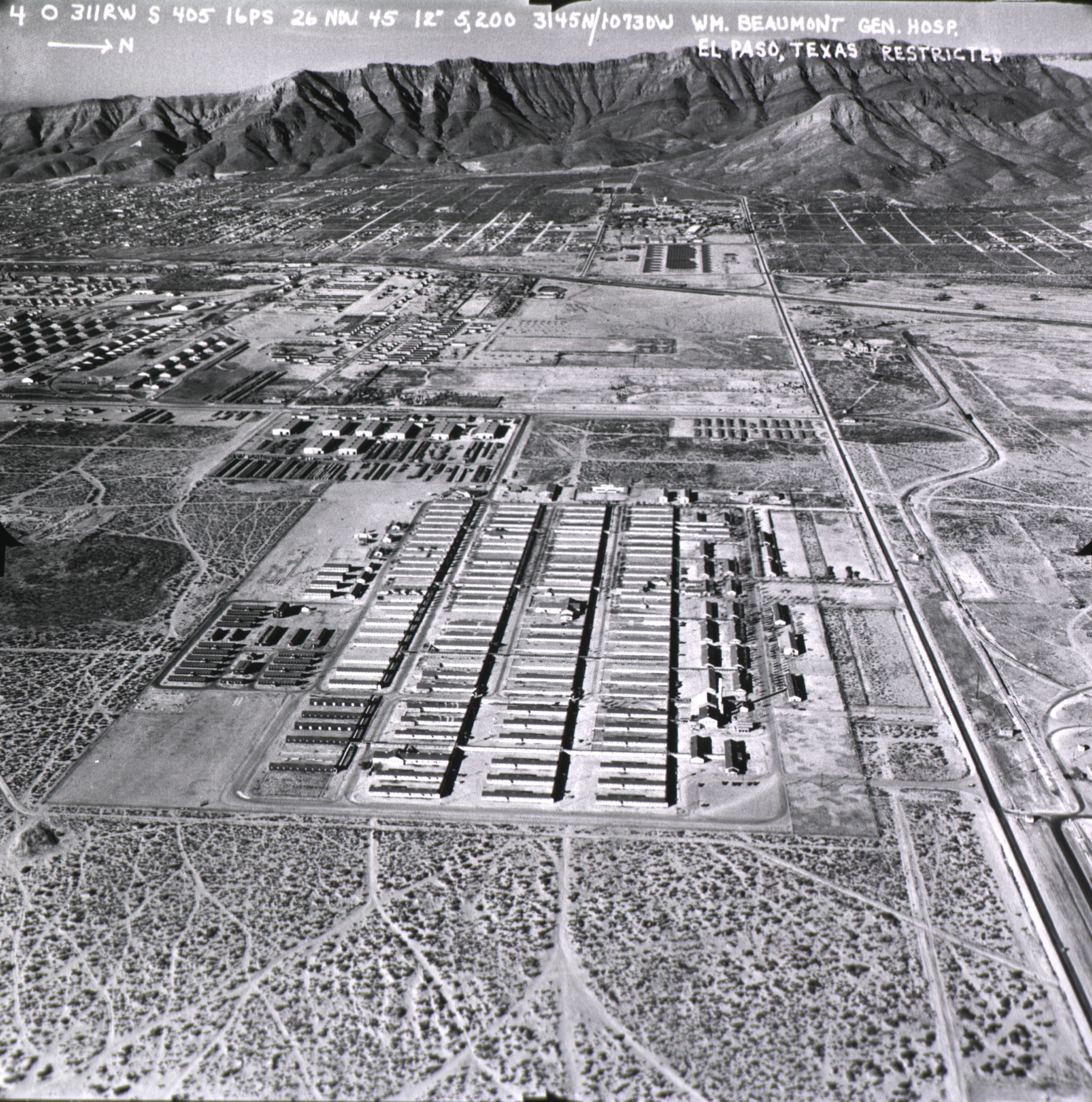
Aerial view of the William Beaumont General Hospital at the base of the Franklin Mountains on 26 November 1945

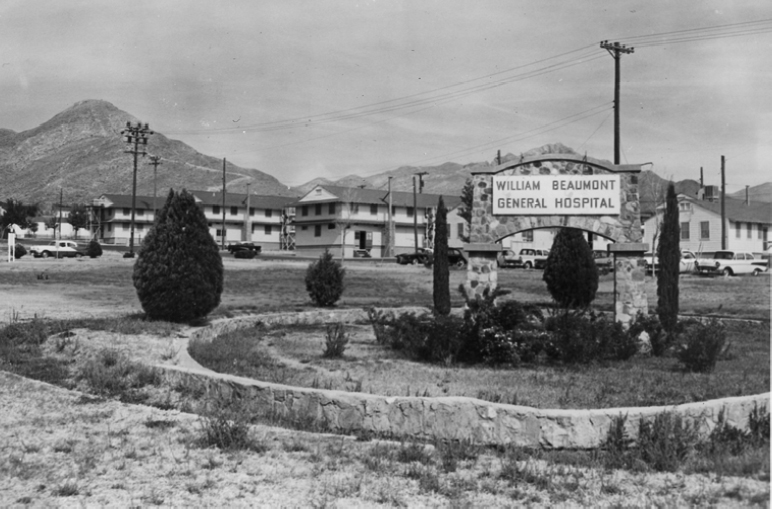
World War II temporary buildings, 1959

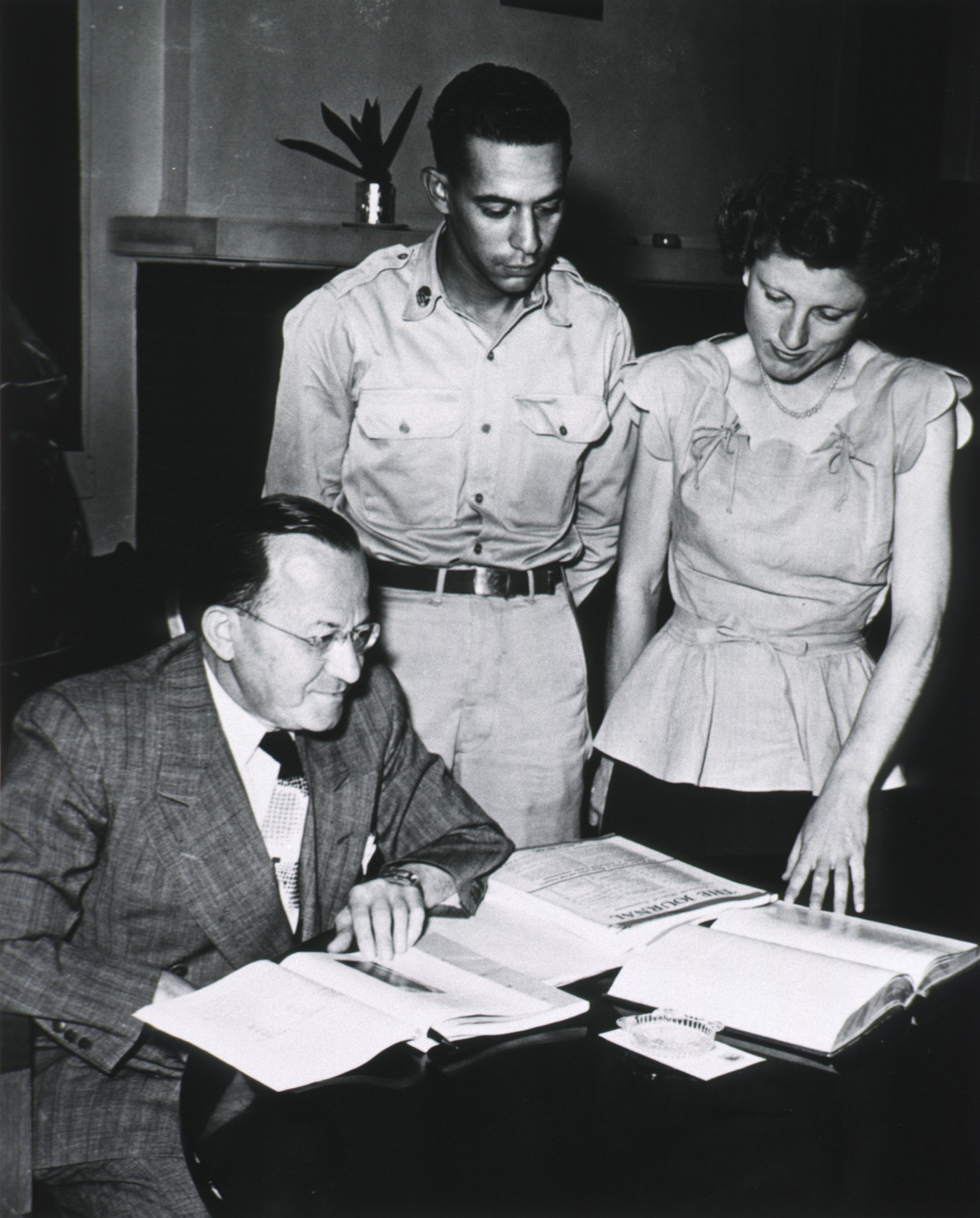
Dr. Hyman I. Goldstein seated at a library table. Standing next to him are Pfc. Carillo and Myrline Triplett, librarian at William Beaumont General Hospital.

WBGH served as one of many prisoner-of-war hospitals across the United States that supported the prisoner-of-war camps at Fort Bliss and surrounding camps during World War II.

During early 1945, approximately 6,000 inpatients were treated. In addition, a military school for medical technicians offered specialized training in surgical, dental, laboratory, x-ray, pharmacy, and veterinary procedures. The hospital had a fully equipped physical therapy and occupational therapy center. Also, the artificial eye clinic was opened. Later, the hospital expanded into a neuro-psychiatric treatment and orthopedic surgery center. Following the war, WBGH continued to serve the medical needs of Fort Bliss and surrounding military installations until the Army's needs outgrew the capacity of the hospital. During the war, the William Beaumont General Hospital trained approximately 16,000 medical technicians, including over a thousand WAC recruits. The hospital also became a specialty center for plastic surgery, ophthalmic surgery, neuropsychiatry, and deep radiation therapy. In the last year of the war alone, some 26,358 patients received medical treatment at the hospital.

In late 1945, Wernher von Braun and the original 82 members of the Project Paperclip group used one of the old WBGH buildings as their initial laboratory and headquarters as noted by an Army historian:

The von Braun team set up shop in the dusty remains of a former temporary hospital area. The wooden buildings contained no laboratories or equipment but they were the best that could be provided at the time. At least it was a place to begin, and it was close to the new missile firing range at White Sands, New Mexico.

Beaumont was one of only ten of the Army's sixty-three general hospitals retained after World War II. Besides providing medical care to returning wounded soldiers during the conflicts in both Korea and Vietnam, the hospital also provided general medicine and surgical services to veterans and personnel at Fort Bliss and other regional military installations.

=== William Beaumont Army Medical Center (1969–present) ===
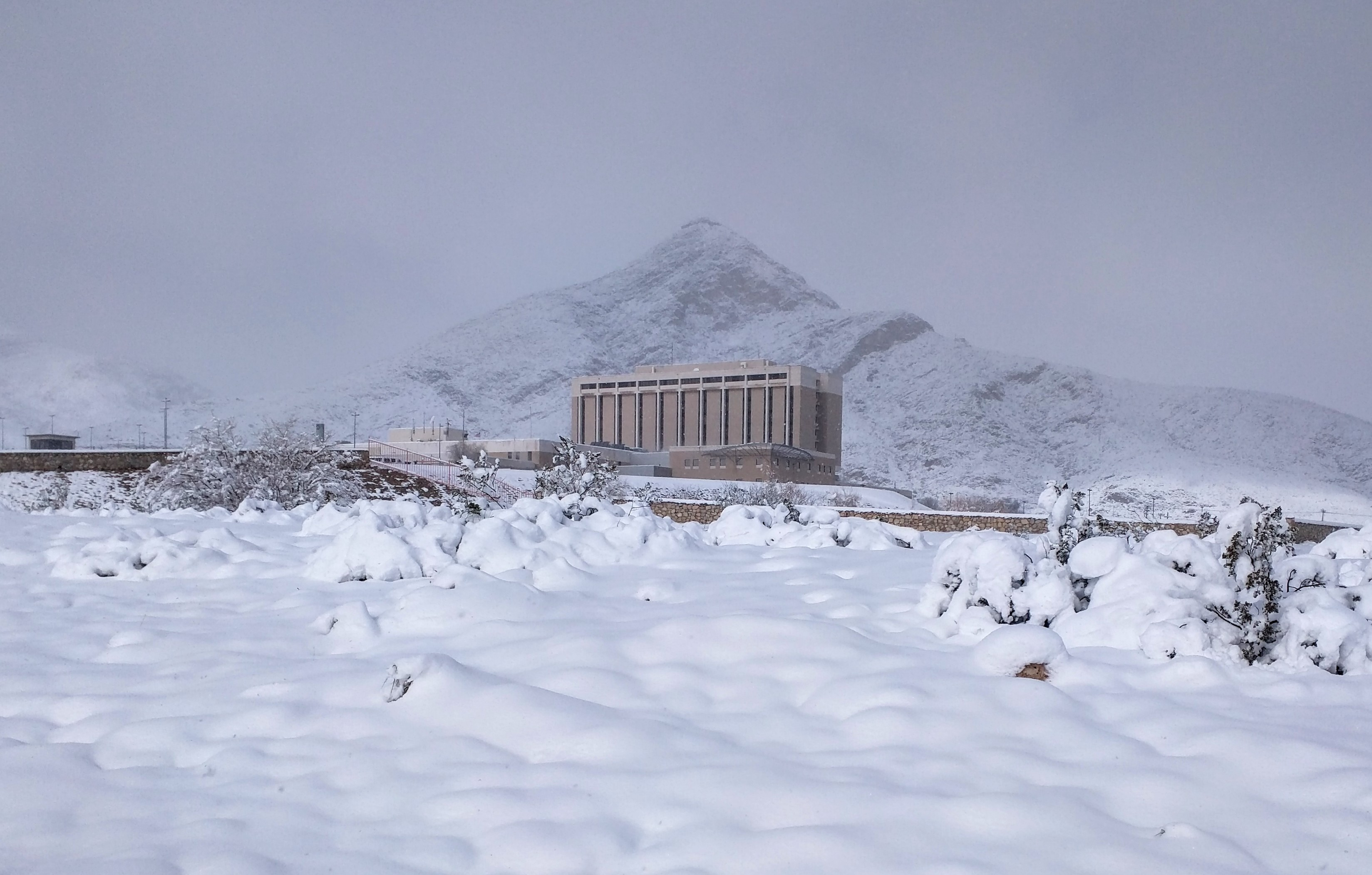
After the December 2015 winter storm

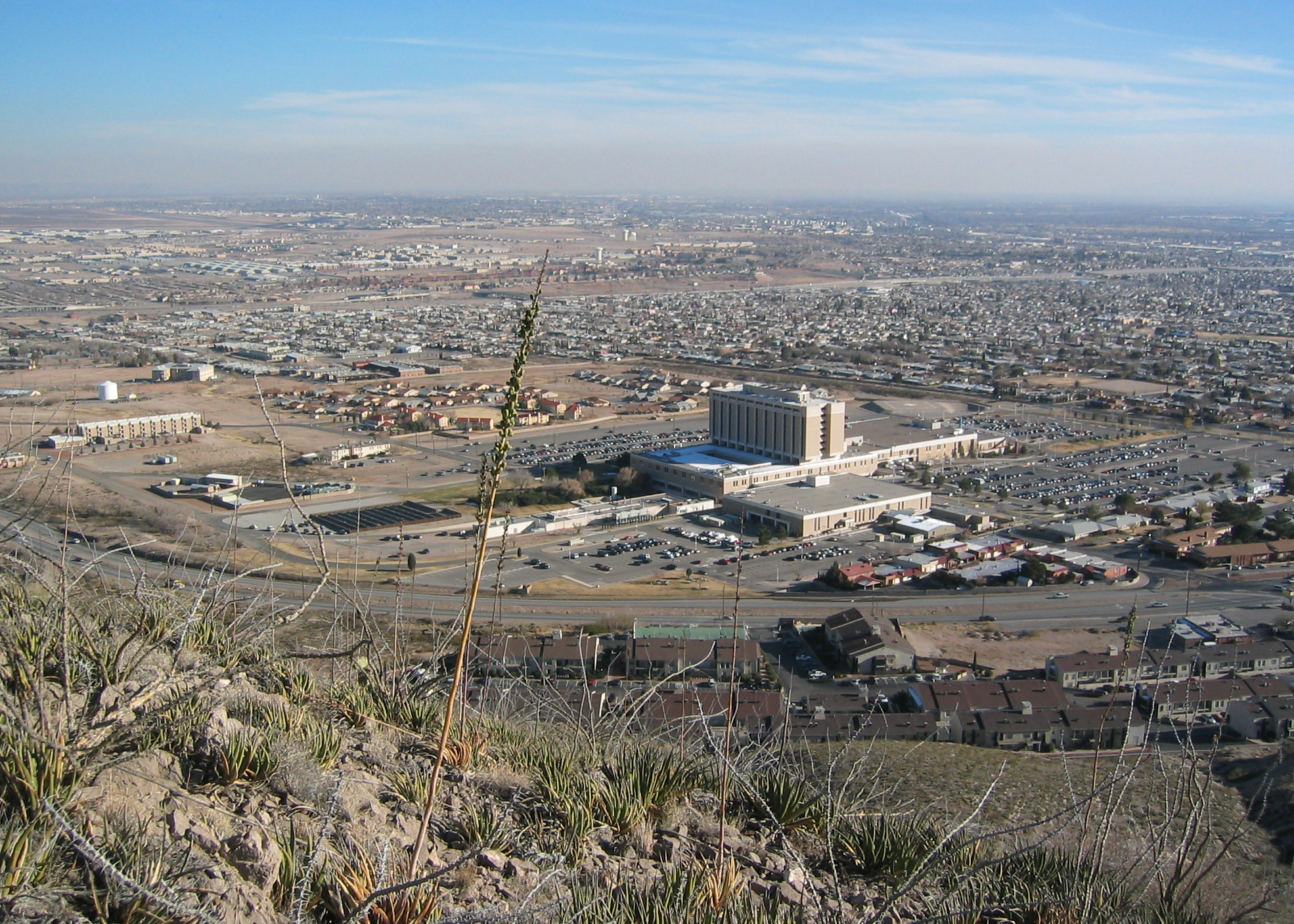
WBAMC and Summit Place neighborhood viewed from the trail up to El Paso's Sugarloaf Peak. Summit Park and Reservoir (at Piedras Street and Fillmore Avenue) are visible toward the right.

In 1969, the Army began construction of a new, 12-story hospital to the west of the WBGH area. Completed in 1972, the new facility became known as the William Beaumont Army Medical Center. The building is in the modernism architectural style, with a 124 ft tower. Although originally designed for 611 beds, by the early 1980s the hospital had a capacity of 463. The Omar N. Bradley building, an addition to the west-side of the main hospital, was opened in 1982; it provides an additional 200,000 square feet (19,000 m^{2}) of clinical and administrative space. Today, the hospital has a bed capacity of more than 150 patients; during contingencies, the hospital can expand to a capacity of 373 patients. As the Southwest's major regional Army medical center, this modern facility now provides medical care to active and retired military personnel and their dependents in the three-state region of Texas, New Mexico, and Arizona.

Maj. Gen. (Dr.) Charles C. Pixley, the hospital commander from September 1975 through December 1976, was promoted to lieutenant general in 1977 and became the Surgeon General of the Army.

== Fisher House ==
The Fisher House Foundation, which provides free lodging for military families with a hospitalized relative, operates a facility at WBAMC. It celebrated its 20th anniversary of operation on 22 February 2014.

== Unit insignia ==
The design of the WBAMC unit insignia symbolizes some of the highlights of WBAMC's namesake Dr. William Beaumont, Beaumont's patient Alexis St. Martin, the unit's medical tradition, and the unit's location in El Paso.

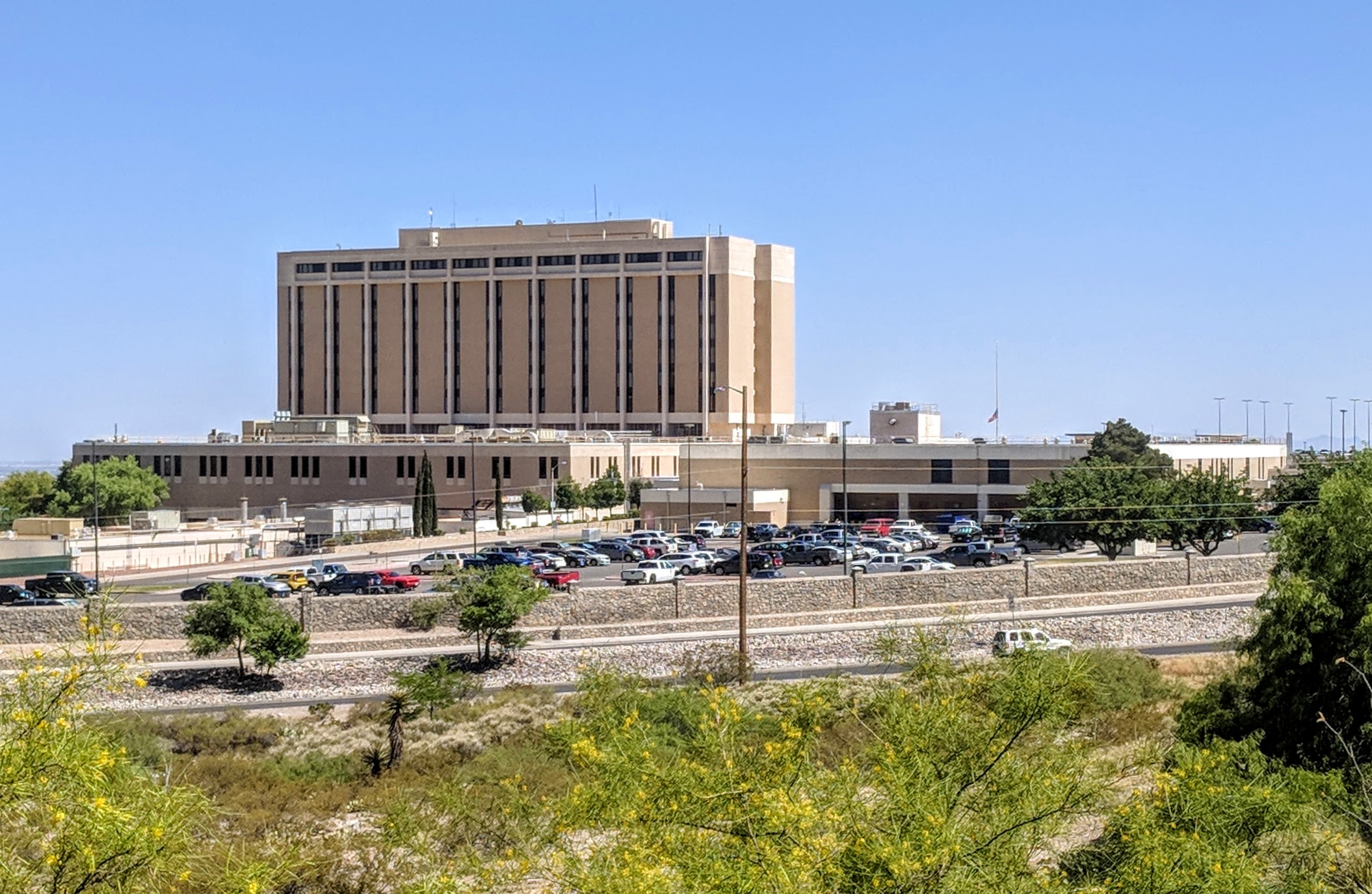
The previous Beaumont Hospital, in use until July 2021.

The fleur-de-lis pointing north refers to Dr. Beaumont's assignment in 1820 to the Northern Michigan outpost of Fort Mackinac. The circular window at the center of the cross refers to Alexis St. Martin's stomach wound which never closed, presenting Beaumont with a window through which he could study the workings of the human stomach. The white and maroon colors are traditional to the US Army Medical Department. The Maltese cross refers to the Knights Hospitallers of medieval times as a symbol of the medical profession. WBAMC's location in El Paso, Texas, is symbolized by the vertical arm of the cross passing between the mountains (in reference to the English translation of El Paso as "the pass") and terminating upon the blue wave which represents the Rio Grande.

== Notable patients ==
Throughout its history, William Beaumont Army Medical Center has treated numerous high-profile military figures, historical groups, and individuals involved in significant national events.

- Omar N. Bradley, The last American five-star general. In 1974, General Bradley moved to El Paso, where he lived the remainder of his retirement in a special residence situated on the grounds of the William Beaumont Army Medical Center to receive continuous, specialized medical care from the hospital staff until his death in 1981.
- Steven Kazmierczak, the perpetrator of the 2008 Northern Illinois University shooting was treated at WBAMC upon findings that he had lied about his past mental health problems. After evaluations, Kazmierczak was given an uncharacterized discharge and returned to his native Illinois.
- William O. Wooldridge, the first Sergeant Major of the Army and a highly decorated veteran of World War II, the Korean War, and the Vietnam War. Wooldridge was treated at WBAMC during his later years residing in El Paso, Texas.
- Several of the Prisoners of War (POWs) from the 2003 invasion of Iraq were treated at WBAMC.
- World War II Axis POWs – During World War II, William Beaumont General Hospital served as a critical treatment center for German and Italian prisoners of war held in various internment camps across New Mexico and Texas (such as Roswell, Lordsburg, and Artesia). Several POWs who succumbed to illnesses at WBGH are remembered during the annual German National Day of Mourning (Volkstrauertag) ceremonies held at Fort Bliss.
- Bob Williams – A professional baseball player and first baseman signed by the Chicago White Sox. Williams played three years in the minor leagues before being drafted into the Army during World War II. He tragically died from an unidentified illness at William Beaumont General Hospital in January 1943.
- Dr. Timothy Fjordbak – A 63-year-old clinical psychologist who left private practice to treat military veterans following the September 11 attacks. He was tragically became a patient and a fatal victim of the 2015 Fort Bliss shooting, which took place on the WBAMC campus at the Veteran's Affairs clinic.

== Co-located Veterans Health Care Center ==
The El Paso VA Health Care System has a joint venture with William Beaumont Army Medical Center. This joint venture allows both activities to maximize resource utilization. Through the joint venture, VA purchases emergency department service and inpatient care for acute medical, psychiatric and surgical emergencies. The joint venture has led to unique agreements that have increased patient access in general surgery and vascular surgery.

== See also ==
- MEDCOM
- Uniformed Services University of the Health Sciences
- Paul L. Foster School of Medicine
- Dr. William Beaumont
- Major General (Dr.) Charles C. Pixley
- Fort Bliss
- General Omar Bradley
- Sergeant Major of the Army William O. Wooldridge
