= Isidor Zuckermann =

Austrian businessman (1866–1946)

Isidor Zuckermann (May 21, 1866 – 1946) was an Austrian businessman. He was born near Kamianets-Podilskyi in the Podolia Governorate of the Russian Empire (modern-day Ukraine), and emigrated with his family to the United Kingdom in 1939. He died in Keswick, Cumbria in 1946. He is interred in St. John's Church Cemetery, Keswick.

== Career ==
Zuckermann was CEO of the Aktiengesellschaft für Mühlen-und Holzindustrie (Mill and Wood Industry Stock Corporation) in Vienna from 1894 to 1938. At the end of World War I, and the breakup of the Austrian Hungarian Empire with the resulting political and financial chaos, Zuckermann and his company participated within a business combination of other wood, timber, and plywood companies under the organization umbrella of Foresta AG that was managed through the Banca Commerciale Italiano, now the Banca Intesa. This participation was primarily active in the early to middle 1920s.

Zuckermann spent his career in all segments of the wood industry, including the great forests of Bialowieza (portions of which are in Poland), and in his early work the Austrio-Hungarian Empire. He created a vertically integrated wood products company with headquarters in Vienna during the early 20th century. This company was instrumental in introducing, on a major scale, the use of narrow gauge rails with steam engines for the transportation of harvested logs to saw mills, a major improvement in this industry. Although there were some others who had experimented with this technique, Zuckermann and the AMH company maximized its use.

== Family ==
Zuckermann married Stefanie (née Steiner), a native of Žilina, Slovakia. They had two sons: Karl (1902-1960), and Frederick (1903-1996). After spending the formative years of his life in Russia and in the Eastern parts of the Austro-Hungarian Empire, he took up permanent residence in Vienna in 1913. Both sons attended schools in Vienna, and both graduated from the University of Vienna, receiving, according to the Archiv der Universitaet Wien, "Doctorates in Political Economy; Karl in 1925 (thesis: Das Zurechnungsproblem und seine Loesungen, and Frederick in 1926, [Doctor rerum politicarum, or dr. rer pol.], and was the author of the doctoral thesis Die Stellung der Berufsgenossenschaften im Staate und das Problem der berufsständischen Vertretung. Karl, prior to World War II established a plywood company in the Merseyside area of Liverpool that specialized in plywood panels for doors. With the start of World War II, this company's production was utilized by the British government for such things as "aeroplane wings and submarines."

Isidor Zuckermann had a sister, Rose, and an older brother, Joshua. Rose emigrated to the United States in 1886, at first settling in Baltimore, Maryland where she married Solomon Joseph Goldstein who had arrived in 1880. They later moved to Philadelphia and then to Camden, New Jersey where Solomon was involved in business.

== See also ==
- Hyman I. Goldstein and Leopold Z. Goldstein - Isidor Zuckermann's nephews
- Ax Men
