= Beaumont Hill (Antarctica) =

Mountain in Antarctica

Beaumont Hill (64°1′S 61°59′W) is a hill 4.5 nautical miles (8 km) northeast of Chauveau Point on the west side of Liege Island, in the Palmer Archipelago. Shown on an Argentine government chart in 1957, but not named. Photographed by Hunting Aerosurveys Ltd. in 1956–57, and mapped from these photos in 1959. Named by the United Kingdom Antarctic Place-Names Committee (UK-APC) for William Beaumont (1785-1853), American surgeon who made important researches on gastric function.
