= Goldstein's toe sign =

- Differential diagnosis: Down syndrome or cretinism

Goldstein's toe sign is a feature identified by Dr. Hyman Isaac Goldstein (1887–1954), an American physician and medical historian. A greater distance separates the largest two toes of some people exhibiting Down syndrome or cretinism."
