= Fort Bliss shooting =

Murder of psychologist at El Paso VA clinic

- Location: Veteran's Affairs clinic, William Beaumont Army Medical Center, Fort Bliss, Texas, U.S.
- Date: January 6, 2015 c. 3:10 p.m. – c. 5:30 p.m. (MDT)
- Attack type: Shooting, murder-suicide
- Weapon: .380 SIG Sauer P238
- Deaths: 2 (including the perpetrator)
- Victims: Timothy Fjordbak, PsyD
- Perpetrator: Jerry Serrato

The Fort Bliss shooting occurred on January 6, 2015, when Jerry Serrato, a 48-year-old U.S. Army veteran, fatally shot Dr. Timothy Fjordbak, a psychologist, at the Veteran's Affairs clinic located on the grounds of William Beaumont Army Medical Center of Fort Bliss, Texas. No further casualties were reported during the shooting. However, the shooting and the subsequent emergency response resulted in the lock-down of the hospital and two nearby schools for nearly two hours while law enforcement officials worked to resolve the situation.

== Background ==
In the summer 2014, amid the Veterans Affairs scandal, the El Paso Veterans Affairs clinic had one of the longest waiting times in the U.S., with an average wait time of 60 days to see a medical professional. During this time, Congressman Beto O'Rourke indicated that El Paso's VA clinic had five open spots for mental health professionals that had yet to be filled.

In the late summer of 2014, Fort Bliss increased its security detail in response to claims that there was an ISIS presence in Ciudad Juárez, Mexico, and that they had made unspecified threats against the base. Despite the increased measures taken, two separate installations studies conducted by the Department of Defense found Fort Bliss's installation security to be inadequate. As a result of these studies, then newly named commander Major General Stephen Twitty announced security changes for the post that would go into effect during the latter half of 2014.

== Shooting ==
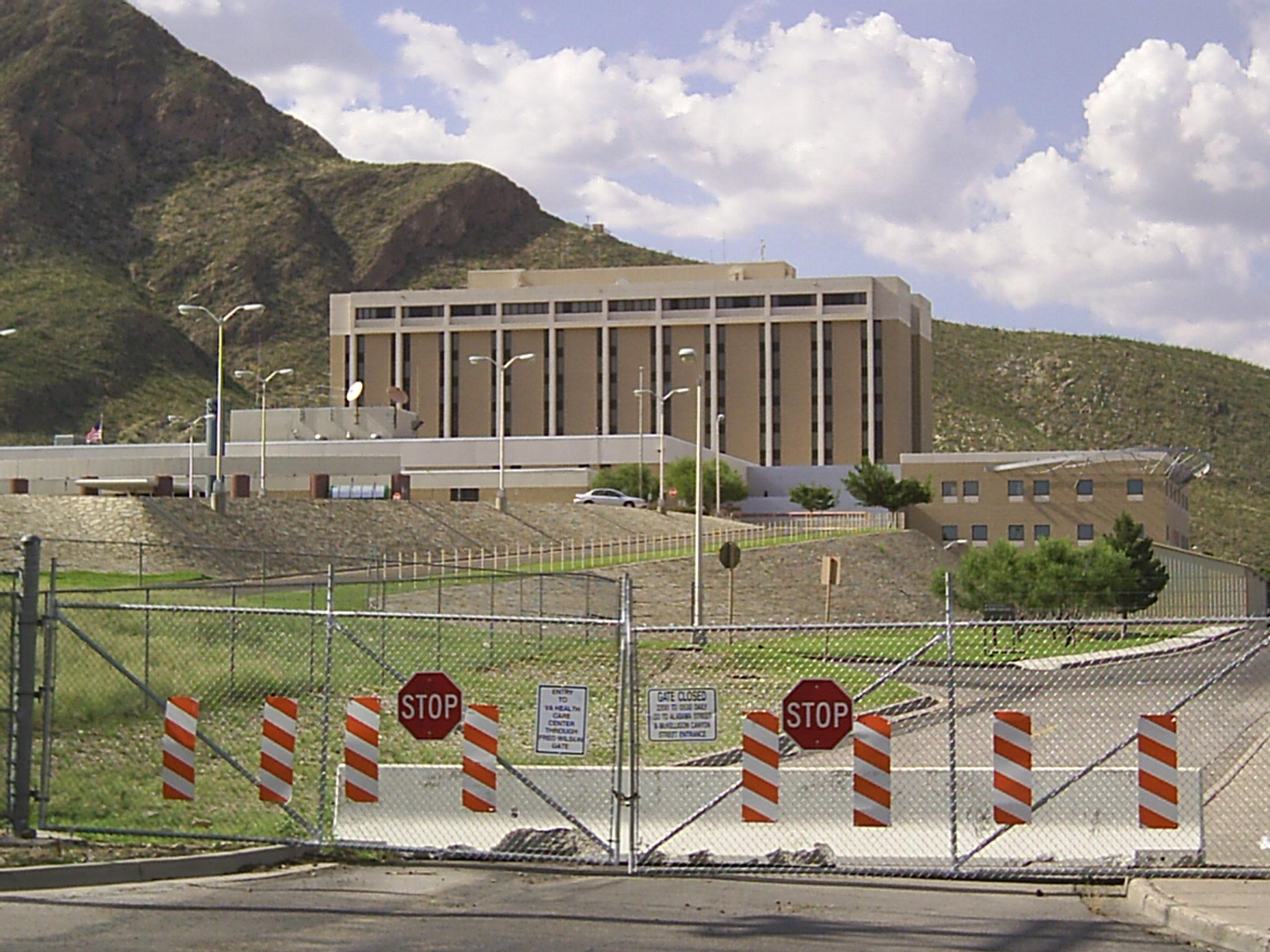
William Beaumont Army Medical Center, shown here outside the base at the now decommissioned Piedras Gate Entrance facing north. The VA clinic is located in the foreground of this image.

At approximately 3:10 p.m. MST on January 6, 2015, 48-year-old Jerry Serrato, an Ohio Army National Guardsman who later served in the regular U.S. Army, shot 63-year-old Timothy Fjordbak, a psychologist who left private practice to work with military veterans in the aftermath of the September 11 attacks. The incident resulted in a "code white" declaration at William Beaumont Army Medical Center, advising people that an active shooter was present and to take shelter.

The shooting sparked a massive multi-agency response, with officers from Fort Bliss's Military Police, the El Paso Police Department, the El Paso SWAT team, the El Paso Independent School District Police Department, the U.S. Department of Homeland Security's Immigration and Customs Enforcement and Customs and Border Protection agencies, and the Federal Bureau of Investigation responding to the report of an active shooter in the area. Ground personnel were reinforced by two Department of Homeland Security helicopters, both of which took up station in circular pattern around the VA clinic and hospital during the stand off. In addition, the nearby Bassett Middle School and Travis Elementary School went on lock-down following the reports of an active shooter in the area.

In the aftermath of the shooting, the FBI assumed responsibility for the investigation and began processing the estimated 400 witnesses for testimony while simultaneously collecting evidence from the VA center. In a press release shortly after the situation was resolved, it was announced that the hospital and VA clinic would be closed on Wednesday to allow the FBI to process the scene. Despite the two fatalities, the response to the active shooting was described as "a model of how to respond."

== Shooter ==
Jerry Serrato (c. 1967 – January 6, 2015) was identified as the shooter. He is said to have been a member of the Ohio Army National Guard, enlisting in 1985 and serving until 1996. He later enlisted in the United States Army in July 2006. Serrato served in Iraq as an infantryman with the 10th Mountain Division's 89th Cavalry Regiment, 4th Brigade Combat Team at Fort Polk, Louisiana from March to July 2007 before being medically discharged with undisclosed physical ailments in February 2009. At the time of his discharge, he held the rank of specialist, and had been awarded the National Defense Service Medal, the Iraq Campaign Medal with a campaign star, a Global War on Terrorism Service Medal, and the Army Service Ribbon.

Serrato had worked in the El Paso VA as a desk clerk in 2013. According to the FBI, Serrato threatened Dr. Fjordbak during a chance encounter at a local grocery store in October 2013. Fjordbak reported the threat, but press accounts were not clear about the recipient of Fjordbak's report or if there was a subsequent investigation.

== Victim ==
Timothy Fjordbak, PsyD, 63, was a staff supervisory psychologist for the El Paso Veterans Affairs Health Care Systems Clinic, Special Examinations Unit. Friends and colleagues described him as "... humane, caring, perceptive and dedicated, with a gentle demeanor that he brought to his work." The Department of Veterans Affairs Secretary had given him the "Hearts and Hands" award, which "recognizes VA employees whose dedication to Veterans is marked by the highest standards in patient care", in 2009.

New Mexico State University established a scholarship in Dr. Fjordbak's honor, and the American Psychological Association awarded him with a 2015 Presidential Citation, "for dedicating his professional career to caring for underserved populations". APA President Barry Anton, PhD presented the posthumous award to Eric Fjordbak, Dr. Fjordbak's brother, who accepted the award on behalf of the Fjordbak family in May 2015. Dr. Anton stated that Dr. Fjordbak was "... universally described as a compassionate and gentle man who treated all people with kindness and dignity. Passionate about caring for those who had sacrificed for our country, Dr. Fjordbak paid the ultimate sacrifice. He will be deeply missed."
