= William Beaumont =

American physician (1785–1853)

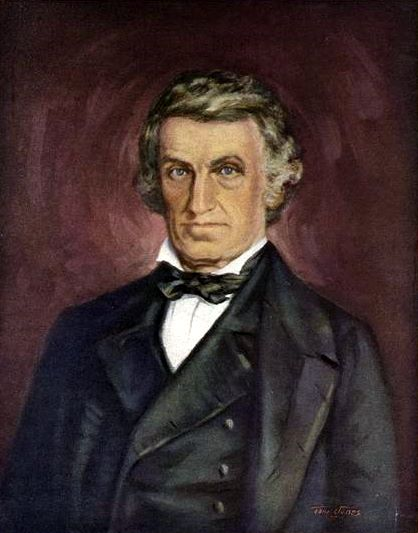
- William Beaumont
- Born: November 21, 1785; Lebanon, Connecticut, U.S.
- Died: April 25, 1853 (aged 67); St. Louis, Missouri, U.S.
- Resting place: Bellefontaine Cemetery
- Known for: Research on Alexis St. Martin
- Scientific career
- Fields: Medicine

William Beaumont (November 21, 1785 – April 25, 1853) was a surgeon in the U.S. Army. He served as an assistant surgeon from 1812 to 1815, and then rejoined the army in 1820. He became known as the "Father of Gastric Physiology" for his research on human digestion on Alexis St. Martin in 1822.

== Early life ==
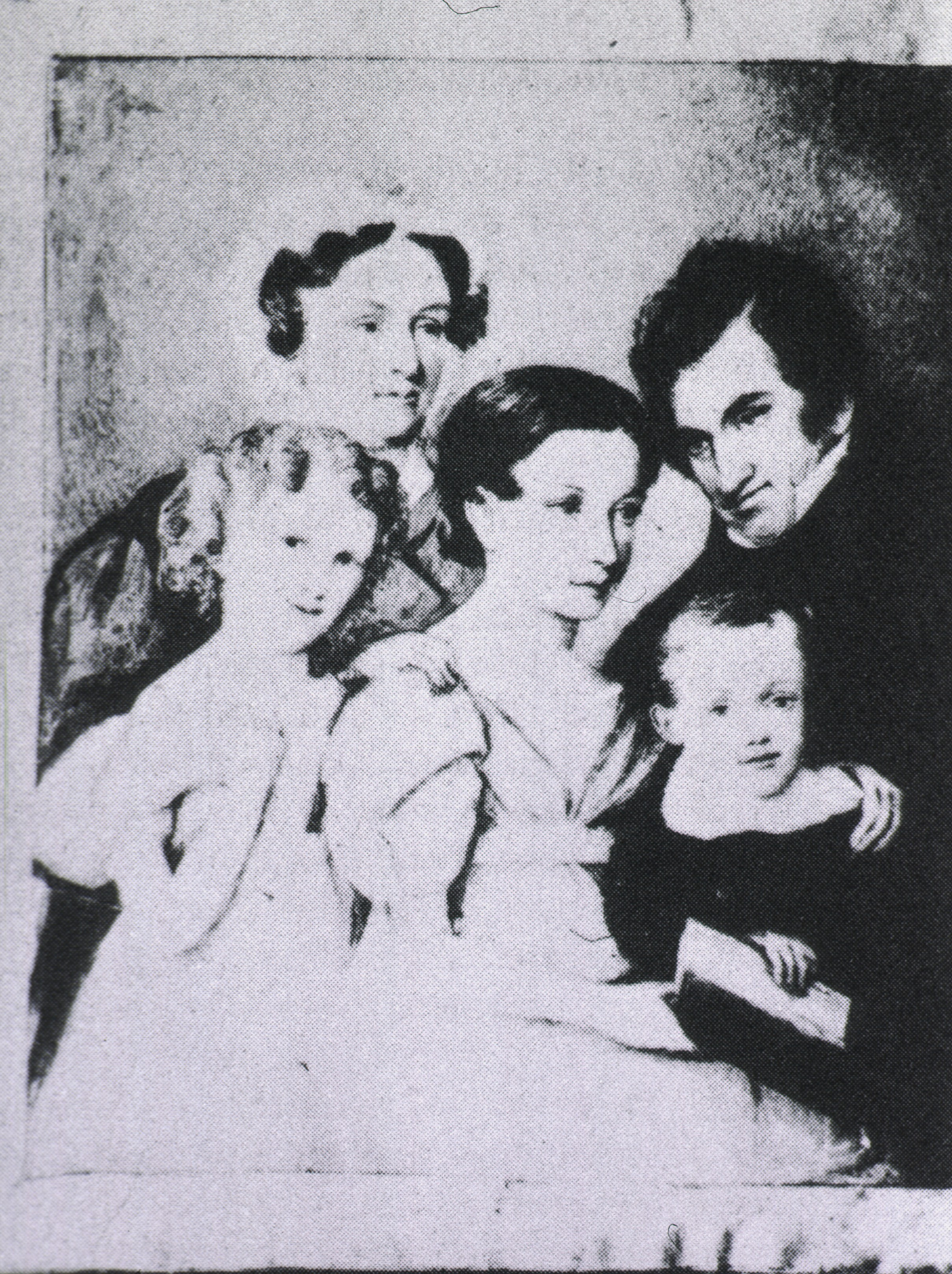
William Beaumont and family

William Beaumont was born to Samuel Beaumont and Lucretia Abel in Lebanon, Connecticut; his father was a farmer. He left his home after he turned twenty-one, moved to Champlain, New York and obtained a teaching job. In 1810 he relocated to St. Albans, Vermont, where he trained to become a physician through an apprenticeship with Dr. Truman Powell. In June 1812, the Third Medical Society of the State of Vermont in Burlington examined his knowledge "on the anatomy of the human body, and the theory and practice of physic and surgery" and recommended him as "judicious and safe practitioner in the different avocations of the medical profession."

From 1812 until 1815, Beaumont served as an assistant surgeon in the Army during the War of 1812, participating in the Battle of Plattsburgh. After the war ended, he started a private practice in Plattsburgh, New York, but by 1820, Beaumont had rejoined the Army as a surgeon. He was assigned a location at Fort Mackinac. Beaumont took a leave in 1821 and married Deborah "Debby" Green Platt in Plattsburgh before returning to his post. Deborah was divorced from Nathaniel Platt, whose uncle Zephaniah Platt founded Plattsburgh after the beginning of the Revolutionary War. Her father, Israel Green, was a third cousin of General Nathanael Greene.

== Experiments with St. Martin ==
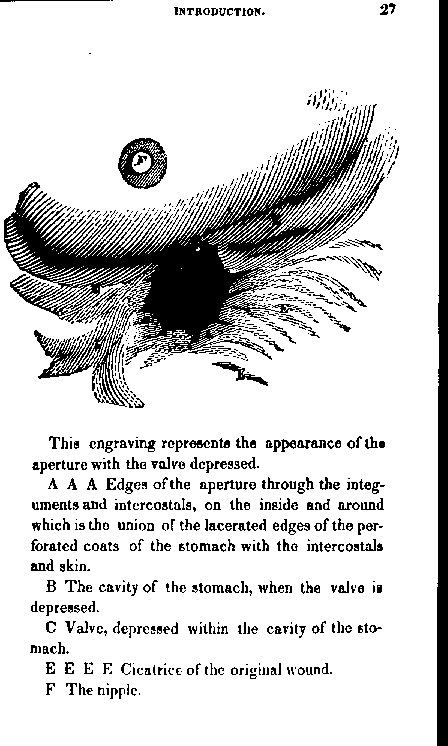
From Beaumont's Experiments and Observations on the Gastric Juice and the Physiology of Digestion, 1833 (p. 27)

On June 6, 1822, an employee of the American Fur Company on Mackinac Island named Alexis St. Martin was accidentally shot in the stomach at close range by the discharge of a shotgun loaded with buckshot that injured his ribs and his stomach. Beaumont treated his wound, but expected St. Martin to die from his injuries. Despite this dire prediction, St. Martin survived – but with a hole, or fistula, in his stomach that never fully healed. Unable to continue work for the American Fur Company, he was hired as a servant by Beaumont.

By August 1825, Beaumont had been relocated to Fort Niagara in New York, and St. Martin went with him. Beaumont recognized that he had in St. Martin an unusual opportunity to observe digestive processes. Beaumont began to perform experiments on digestion using St. Martin's stomach. Most of the experiments were conducted by tying a piece of food to a string and inserting it through the hole into the stomach. Every few hours, Beaumont would remove the food and observe how well it had been digested. Beaumont also extracted a sample of gastric acid from St. Martin's stomach for analysis. In September, St. Martin ran away from Beaumont and moved to Canada, leaving Beaumont to concentrate on his duties as an army surgeon, but Beaumont had St. Martin caught so Beaumont could continue to exhibit him.

Beaumont also used samples of stomach acid taken out of St. Martin to "digest" bits of food in cups. This led to the important discovery that the stomach acid, and not solely the mashing, pounding, and squeezing of the stomach, digests the food into nutrients the stomach can use; in other words, digestion was primarily a chemical process and not a mechanical one.

During 1826 and 1827, Beaumont was stationed at Fort Howard in Green Bay, Wisconsin. In 1828 he was transferred to St. Louis, Missouri. While en route, St. Martin was ordered to stop at Fort Crawford in Prairie du Chien, Wisconsin, to serve as Beaumont's servant again. In early 1831, Beaumont conducted another set of experiments on St. Martin's stomach, ranging from the simple observation of normal digestion to the effects that temperature, exercise, and even emotions have on the digestive process.

Beaumont published the account of his experiments in 1833 as Experiments and Observations on the Gastric Juice, and the Physiology of Digestion. He and St. Martin parted ways, with Beaumont eventually returning to St. Louis and St. Martin to his home in Quebec province, Canada. On and off for the next twenty years, Beaumont tried to get St. Martin to move to St. Louis, but the move never occurred.

== Death ==
Beaumont died in 1853 at the age of 67 in St. Louis, Missouri, as a result of slipping on ice-covered steps. He was buried at Bellefontaine Cemetery.

His papers are held at Washington University in St. Louis School of Medicine Library, and copies are held at the National Library of Medicine.

== Legacy ==
Several institutions are named after William Beaumont, including:

- Beaumont Health, with associated hospitals in Royal Oak, Michigan, and throughout Metro Detroit
  - affiliated William Beaumont School of Medicine at Oakland University
- Beaumont Elementary School in Green Bay, Wisconsin
- Beaumont High School in St. Louis, Missouri
- William Beaumont Army Medical Center in Fort Bliss, Texas (Dining Facility on the first floor of the hospital is named for Alexis St. Martin)
- William Beaumont Elementary School in Waterford, Michigan
- Beaumont Highway, in Beaumont's hometown of Lebanon
- Beaumont Hall, which houses the Biology and Psychology programs at SUNY Plattsburgh
- Beaumont Hill, a hill in Antarctica

== In popular culture ==
- Beaumont's experiments on St. Martin were featured in the April 2, 2012, episode of Radiolab.
- William Beaumont's experiments on Alexis St. Martin were featured in the episode of Dark Matters: Twisted But True that aired on August 1, 2012.
- A fictionalized history of the complicated doctor–patient relationship between Beaumont and his patient St. Martin was recreated in a novel, Open Wound: The Tragic Obsession of Dr. William Beaumont (2011).
- Beaumont's experiments on St Martin were featured on the podcast "The Dollop with Dave Anthony and Gareth Reynolds" in episode 33, The Stomach Men (November 15, 2014).
- The relationship between Beaumont and St. Martin and Beaumont's experiments on St. Martin are recounted by Dr. Sydnee McElroy and her husband Justin McElroy on their medical podcast Sawbones in the May 13, 2015, episode The Gut Hole Romance, hosted by the Maximum Fun network.
- The story of Beaumont's treatment of and experiments on St. Martin was reenacted on the medical drama Medic, which aired on February 27, 1956.
- A play centered around Beaumont's relationship with St. Martin was published by playwright Alexander Attea in 2022 and experienced a reading at the International Museum of Surgical Science in Chicago, Illinois in the same year.

== Selected writings ==
- Beaumont, William. "Experiments and Observations on the Gastric Juice and the Physiology of Digestion." Plattsburgh: FF Allen, 1833.
- Beaumont, William. "Experiments and Observations on the Gastric Juice and the Physiology of Digestion." Maclachlan and Stewart (Edinburgh), 1838.
