= M. A. W. Shockley =

American general and surgeon

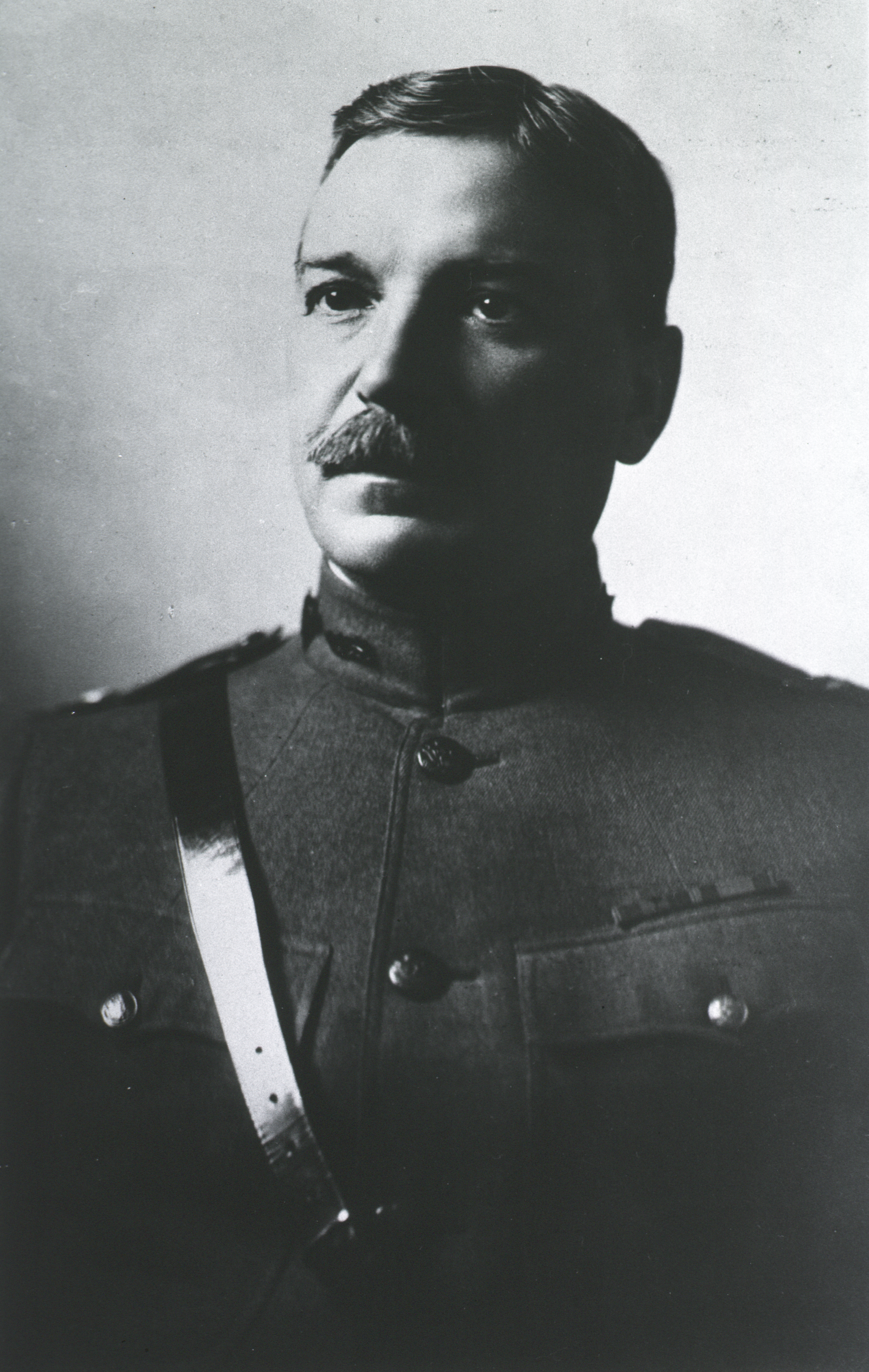
- General Shockley, in uniform of General, Medical Corps
- Born: Major Augustus Wroten Shockley; May 13, 1874; Fort Scott, Kansas, US
- Died: May 10, 1956 (aged 81); MacDill Air Force Base, Florida, US
- Military career
- Allegiance: United States
- Branch: United States Army
- Rank: Brigadier general
- Unit: William Beaumont Army Medical Center
- Conflicts: Spanish–American War 1899; Philippine–American War 1909

Major Augustus Wroten Shockley (1874–1956) was a U.S. Army medical corps officer. He was a veteran of the Philippine–American War, and retired as a brigadier general.

== Biography ==
M. A. W. Shockley was born in Fort Scott, Kansas on May 13, 1874. His father, William B. Shockley, was a surgeon for the Army of the Cumberland, United States Volunteers, during the American Civil War.

M. A. W. Shockley graduated from Kansas City Medical College in 1898.

He died at MacDill Air Force Base Hospital near Tampa on May 10, 1956.

== Military career appointments ==
- Havana, Cuba, 1899, during this assignment he treated soldiers with yellow fever
- Philippine–American War, 1909
- Division of Militia Affairs, departed in August 1919
- Fort Leavenworth, arrived in 1919, Head of the Medical Department at the Army Service School
- Camp Knox, departed in September 1922
- William Beaumont Army Medical Center, appointed commander in September 1922
- Assistant Surgeon General of the Army, appointed in 1925, promoted to brigadier general in 1925
- Carlisle Barracks, retired from this position on 1 October 1936, commander, brigadier general

M. A. W. Shockley was a member of the Military Order of the Loyal Legion of the United States.

== See also ==
- William Beaumont Army Medical Center
