= Charles C. Pixley =

Surgeon General of the US Army

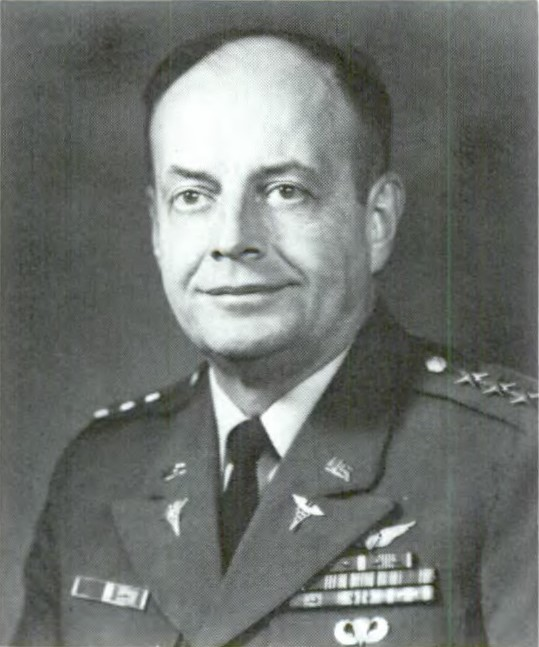
- Born: August 8, 1923; Grants Pass, Oregon
- Died: December 31, 2005 (aged 82); San Antonio, Texas
- Military career
- Allegiance: United States
- Branch: United States Army
- Rank: Lieutenant General
- Commands: Surgeon General of the United States Army
- Conflicts: Vietnam War

Charles Calvin Pixley (August 8, 1923 – December 31, 2005) was the 34th Surgeon General of the United States Army, serving in that capacity from October 1, 1977, to September 20, 1981.

== Early life ==
Pixley was born in Grants Pass, Oregon. While studying at the University of Oregon, he enlisted in the United States Navy on June 6, 1942. Pixley completed his B.A. degree in 1943 and was accepted to medical school. Released from his Navy commitment, he enlisted in the Army on February 29, 1944. Pixley earned his M.D. degree from the University of Oregon Medical School in 1947 and later completed an M.S. degree in surgery at Baylor University. He received a commission as a first lieutenant in the United States Army Reserve on January 20, 1947, and was integrated into the Regular Army in that grade on September 4, 1948.

== Residency ==
He completed his residency in surgery at Robert Packer Hospital, Sayre, Pennsylvania, from November 1948 to September 1949 after which he completed a special course in orthopedic surgery at Columbia College of Physicians and Surgeons until November 1949 when he was promoted to captain. He was then assigned to Brooke Army Medical Center for a one-year residency in general surgery as off 1 January 1950. In March 1950, he was ordered to the Ryukyus Command in Okinawa on a special 90-day temporary duty assignment to help relieve the shortage of medical officers in the Far East Command. In May the TDY was extended to 150 days. He returned to Brooke AMC in November 1950 and resumed his residency in surgery on 1 January 1951. He remained at Brooke for the next 3 years, first as senior resident in general surgery until 31 December 1952 and then as chief resident in general surgery until 31 December 1953.

== Further training ==
In February 1954, Pixley was transferred to Fort Benning, Georgia, and assigned to the U.S. Army Hospital. While at Fort Benning, he was promoted to major in April 1954. He was then assigned to the Office of The Surgeon General from November 1954 until July 1958 when he moved to Fort Sam Houston, Texas, to attend the Officers' Advanced Course at the Medical Field Service School. Then he completed the U.S. Air Force School of Aviation Medicine and the Army Aviation Medical Orientation Course at the U.S. Army Aviation School, Fort Rucker, Alabama, before serving at year in Korea. He then attended the U.S. Army Command and General Staff College at Fort Leavenworth, Kansas, from July 1960 to July 1961. He was promoted to lieutenant colonel in May 1961. In July 1961, he was assigned to the U.S. Army Hospital, Fort Lee, Virginia, and remained there until July 1963 when he moved to the Office of The Surgeon General to become the chief of the Medical Corps Branch, Directorate of Personnel and Training. From August 1965 to July 1966, he attended the Air War College, Maxwell Air Force Base, Alabama,

== Promotions ==
From August 1965 to July 1966, he studied at the Air War College, Maxwell Air Force Base, Alabama, before going to Vietnam in July 1966 to command the 68th Medical Group for a year. He was promoted to colonel in September 1966. He returned from Asia in June 1967 to become for three years the commanding officer of the Army Medical Training Center at Ft. Sam Houston, Texas. He left there in April 1970 for assignment to Ft. George G. Meade, Maryland, where he served as first army surgeon. While there, he was promoted to brigadier general on 1 November 1972. He moved back to The Surgeon General's Office in February 1973, where he spent a month in its Supply and Operations Branch before becoming director of health care operations until August 1975. He next served as commanding general of William Beaumont Army Medical Center, El Paso, Texas, where he was promoted to major general on 1 September 1976. General Pixley left El Paso in December for Ft. Sam Houston, Texas, where he became the superintendent of the Army Academy of Health Sciences, serving there for a year prior to his appointment as the surgeon general.

== Awards and recognitions ==
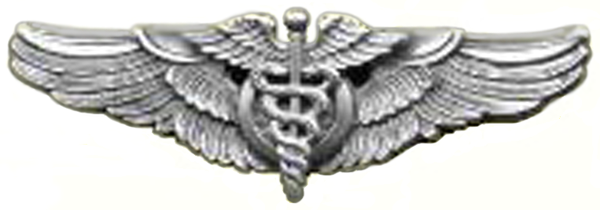
Flight Surgeon Badge
Basic Parachutist Badge

Army Distinguished Service Medal
Legion of Merit with two bronze oak leaf clusters
Army Commendation Medal with two oak leaf clusters
Army Meritorious Unit Commendation
Army Good Conduct Medal
American Campaign Medal
World War II Victory Medal
National Defense Service Medal with oak leaf cluster
Vietnam Service Medal with two service stars
Republic of Vietnam Gallantry Cross Unit Citation
Vietnam Campaign Medal

== Personal ==
Pixley was married to Marian Vanderbrook. The couple had two daughters and six grandchildren. His wife died in 1978 while he was serving as the Army Surgeon General.

After his own death in 2005, Pixley was interred at Fort Sam Houston National Cemetery.
