= Hyman I. Goldstein =

American physician and medical historian

Hyman Isaac Goldstein (November 2, 1887 – 1954) was an American physician and medical historian born in Baltimore, Maryland. He was the eldest son of Rose (sister of Isidor Zuckermann) and Solomon Joseph Goldstein.

== Background ==
After his family moved to Camden, New Jersey, he attended public schools in that city and earned his M.D. from the University of Pennsylvania in 1909. This was followed by graduate work within the medical facilities of the University of Vienna, Austria. Dr. Goldstein specialized in gastroenterology and was a member of numerous national and international medical organizations. He was known to his personal friends and family as, "Doc."

He is responsible for the discovery of Goldstein's Toe Sign and involved with work on Rendu-Osler-Weber disease.

Dr. Goldstein initiated a path in medicine also followed by his two younger brothers, all earning their M.D.s from the University of Pennsylvania. Dr. Leopold Z. Goldstein (1899–1963) specialized in endocrinology, and was co-author of Clinical Endocrinology of the Female. Dr. Henry Z. Goldstein (1903–1975) specialized in otolaryngology, and served during WWII in the Medical Corps, United States Army. Their sister, Sadie (1895–1962), married David E. Cooper, who received his Doctorate in Dentistry from the University of Pennsylvania, Medico-Chirurgical College of Philadelphia, in 1916. Hyman I. Goldstein is interred in the New Camden Cemetery, Camden, New Jersey.

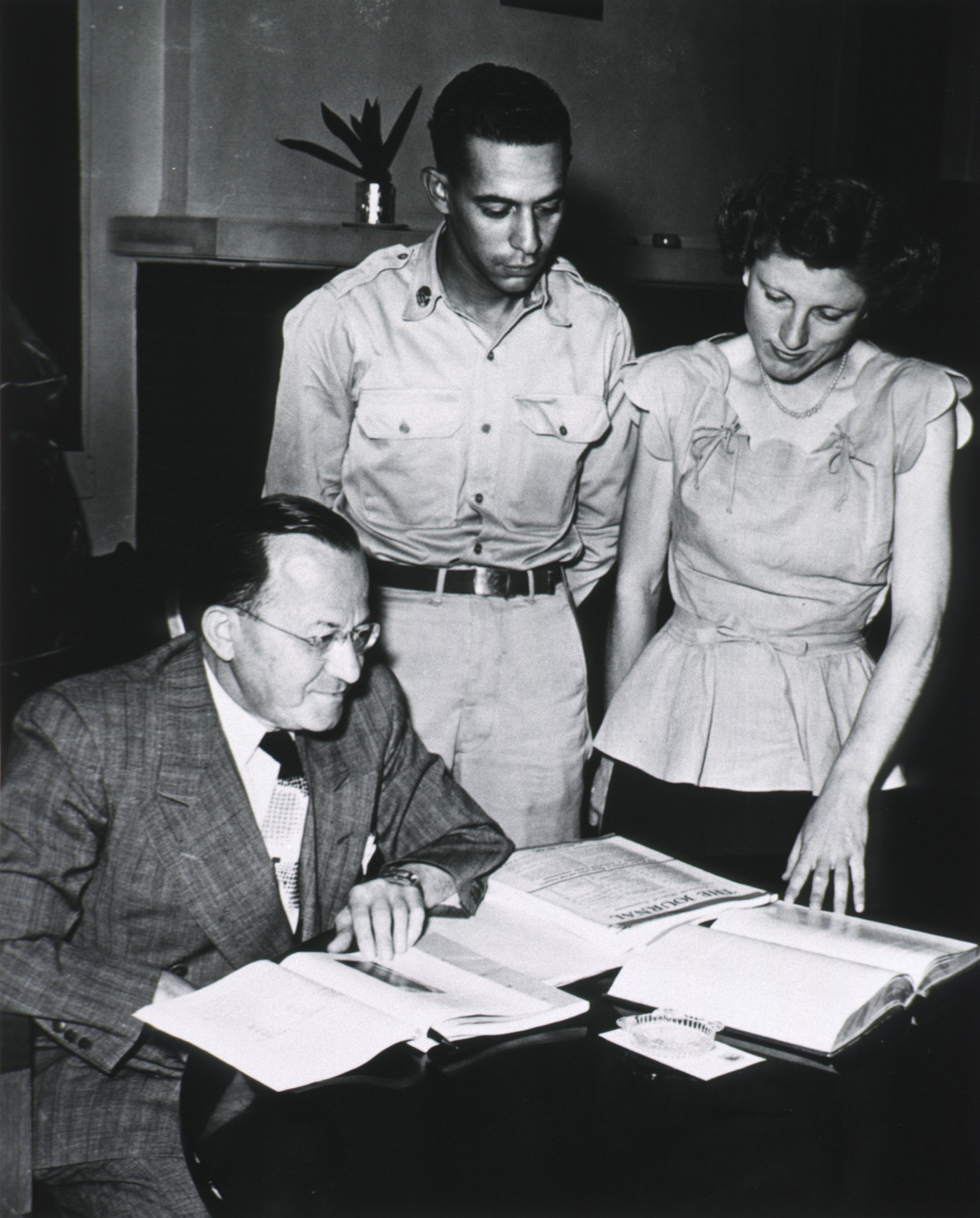
Dr. Hyman I. Goldstein seated at a library table. Standing next to him are Pfc. Carillo and Myrline Triplett, librarian at William Beaumont General Hospital.
