= Leopold Z. Goldstein =

American physician

Leopold Z. Goldstein (1899-1963), was an American physician and endocrinologist

Born in Camden, New Jersey, he graduated from Camden High School and the University of Pennsylvania Medical School in 1922. He continued a path in medicine initiated by his older brother, Hyman I. Goldstein. His younger brother, Henry Z. Goldstein specializing in otolaryngology, also a graduate of the University of Pennsylvania completed the brothers' careers in medicine. Goldstein died in Paris in 1963.

He was chief of gynecology and obstetrics at Einstein Medical Center, Associate Professor at Thomas Jefferson University Medical Center, and an associate of the Gynecology Department of the University of Pennsylvania, all of Philadelphia, PA. During the late 1920s, Goldstein undertook postgraduate studies in Vienna, Austria, and the Rotunda Hospital in Dublin.

He co-authored, "Clinical Endocrinology of the Female" with Charles Mazer, published in Philadelphia and London by W.B. Saunders Company, 1932. He also was the author of over forty articles in his specialty published in respective medical journals during his career, and was a proponent of the use of the colposcopy in physical examinations of female patients.
