= Alexis St. Martin =

Canadian subject of digestion experiments (1802–1880)

- Born: Alexis Bidagan dit St-Martin; April 8, 1802
- Died: June 24, 1880 (aged 78); Saint-Thomas, Quebec, Canada
- Occupations: Voyageur, employed by the American Fur Company
- Known for: Digestion experiments carried out on him by William Beaumont

Alexis Bidagan dit St-Martin (April 8, 1802 (Note: There has been ongoing confusion of brothers with the same name. Alexis of this article had an older brother born in 1794 who died in January 1802. Alexis the voyageur was actually born in April 1802 in Berthierville, Quebec, and named for his brother who had died several months before.) – June 24, 1880) was a Canadian voyageur who is known for his part in experiments on digestion in humans, conducted on him by the American Army physician William Beaumont between 1822 and 1833. St-Martin was shot in a near-fatal accident in 1822. His wound did not heal fully, leaving an opening into his stomach. Studies of St-Martin's stomach led to greater understanding of digestive physiology, particularly in the role of gastric juices.

== Work with Beaumont ==
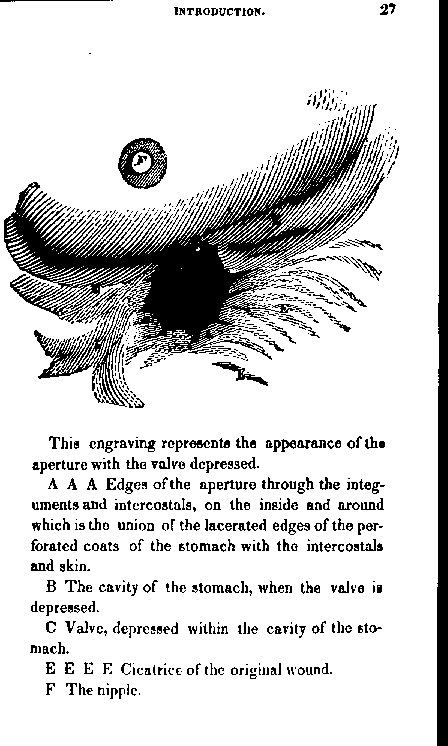
From Beaumont's Experiments and Observations on the Gastric Juice and the Physiology of Digestion, 1833 (p. 27)

On June 6, 1822, St-Martin was accidentally shot by a musket fired from close range at the fur trading post on Mackinac Island. The musket shot left a wound in his side that developed into a fistula connecting his stomach to the outside of his body.

William Beaumont, a US Army surgeon stationed at a nearby army post, treated the wound. Although St-Martin was a healthy young man, he was not expected to recover due to the severity of his wound, which included a perforated stomach, lung injury, and rib fractures. After bleeding him and providing a cathartic, Beaumont monitored St-Martin's recovery. He describes how St-Martin was seriously ill for 11 days with fevers, breathing difficulties, and sloughing of tissues from the wound, until his fever broke and the wound began to show signs of healing. For 17 days following the injury, all food he ate re-emerged from the stomach opening, requiring "nutritious injections per anum" to sustain him, until a tent of lint (a plug of rolled lint) secured by adhesive straps could be used to retain gastric contents. At this point, food began to stay in St-Martin's stomach and bowel function gradually returned. From there, he suffered nearly a year of recurrent abscesses of the rib cartilage, which Beaumont treated with surgical resections and topical application of wine with dilute muriatic acid and asafoetida extract. By June 6, 1823, one year after the shooting, the injuries had healed apart from a persistent opening between the stomach and skin.

When the wound healed, the edge of the hole in the stomach attached itself to the edge of the hole in the skin, creating a permanent gastric fistula. There was very little scientific understanding of digestion at the time and Beaumont recognized the opportunity he had in St-Martin. In August 1825, while stationed at Fort Niagara and accompanied by St-Martin, Beaumont conducted his first official experiment. He suspended pieces of food attached to a string into St-Martin's stomach and later removed them to observe the extent of digestion. This was the first in a series of 238 experiments between 1825 and 1833, which assessed digestive processes under a variety of conditions including fasting, exercise, and different emotional states.

St-Martin participated in Beaumont's experiments while working for him as a servant under contract. Beaumont recalls the chores performed by St-Martin: "During this time, in the intervals of experimenting, he performed all the duties of a common servant, chopping wood, carrying burthens, etc. with little or no suffering or inconvenience from his wound." Some of the experiments were reportedly painful to St-Martin. After placing sacks of food in the stomach, Beaumont noted "the boy complained of some pain and uneasiness at the breast." During a trip to Plattsburgh, New York in September of 1825, St-Martin returned to his native Canada against Beaumont's wishes. There he married and started a family. He would not reunite with Beaumont until 1829, at which point he was living in poverty near Montreal and willing to join Beaumont in Prairie du Chien, Wisconsin. The experiments continued until 1833.

== After the experiments ==
Beaumont published an account of his experiments in 1833 as Experiments and Observations on the Gastric Juice, and the Physiology of Digestion. Beaumont drew 51 conclusions about digestion based on his observations of Alexis St-Martin and his related research. He determined that vegetables were digested more slowly than meat, that milk coagulated early in the digestive process, and that digestion is aided by a churning motion within the stomach. Beaumont's research confirmed William Prout's theory that gastric juices contained hydrochloric acid, and he discovered gastric juice was secreted by the stomach lining.

Eventually Beaumont and St-Martin parted ways: St-Martin wrote to Beaumont from Berthier, Canada, on June 26, 1834, refusing to return to Beaumont. As an army doctor, Beaumont was posted to the Jefferson Barracks in St. Louis, Missouri, in 1834. He became Professor of Surgery in the Medical Department of Saint Louis University in 1837 and resigned from the army in 1839. Repeatedly, Beaumont tried to get St-Martin to move to St. Louis, without success. Beaumont died in 1853. St-Martin's letters reveal that he worked for other physicians after separating from Beaumont, and that he was impoverished at the end of his life.

When Alexis St-Martin died at Saint-Thomas, Quebec, in 1880, his family delayed his burial until the body began to decompose in order to prevent his "resurrection" by medical men, some of whom wished to perform an autopsy or remove the stomach. Alexis Bidagan dit St-Martin is buried at Saint-Thomas Parish Cemetery in Joliette, Quebec, Canada.

The eminent physician Sir William Osler took a great interest in retracing the details of this early incident in the history of gastric physiology and published his research in the form of a well-known essay entitled A Backwoods Physiologist. He also attempted to have the famous stomach placed in the Army Medical Museum in Washington, DC.

== Bibliography ==
- Beaumont, William (1833). Experiments and Observations on the Gastric Juice and the Physiology of Digestion. Edinburgh: Maclachlan and Stewart. p. 1. "gastric juice."
- Myer, Jesse S., ed. (1912). Life and Letters of Dr. William Beaumont. C. V. Mosby Company (St. Louis). p. 1.
- Selzer, Richard (1979). "Alexis St. Martin". Confessions of a knife. Michigan State University Press. ISBN 978-0-87013-605-4.
- Tanner, David E. (2000). "Narrative, Ethics, and Human Experimentation in Richard Selzer's "Alexis St. Martin": The Miraculous Wound Re-Examined". HEC Forum. 12 (2): 149–160. doi:10.1023/A:1008949000333. PMID 11066194. S2CID 45586623.
- BBC Radio 4 (2024) - The Human Subject - episode 1 - The Man with a Hole in His Stomach. https://www.bbc.co.uk/programmes/m00213f6
- St. Martin, Alexis (1937). Four Letters of Alexis St. Martin. Ann Arbor: William L. Clements Library. p. 4 – via HathiTrust Digital Library.
