= Panther Junction, Texas =

- Unincorporated community
- Panther Junction residential area.

- Location within Texas Location within the United States
- Coordinates: 29°19′44″N 103°12′18″W
- Country: United States
- State: Texas
- County: Brewster
- Elevation: 3,720 ft (1,130 m)
- Time zone: UTC-6 (Central (CST))
  - Summer (DST): UTC-5 (CDT)
- ZIP codes: 79834
- Area code: 432
- GNIS feature ID: 1378830

Panther Junction is an unincorporated community located in Brewster County, Texas, United States. The community is located inside Big Bend National Park. The ZIP Code serving the community is 79834, which is addressed to Big Bend National Park.

== Geography ==
Panther Junction is located approximately twenty miles east of Study Butte. The elevation for the community is 3,720 feet (1,130 m) above sea level.

=== Climate ===
Climate data for Panther Junction, Texas, 1991–2020 normals, extremes 1955–present
Month	Jan	Feb	Mar	Apr	May	Jun	Jul	Aug	Sep	Oct	Nov	Dec	Year
Record high °F (°C)	83 (28)	91 (33)	96 (36)	102 (39)	105 (41)	109 (43)	108 (42)	107 (42)	103 (39)	99 (37)	92 (33)	85 (29)	109 (43)
Mean maximum °F (°C)	77.4 (25.2)	82.5 (28.1)	87.9 (31.1)	93.9 (34.4)	99.7 (37.6)	102.5 (39.2)	100.2 (37.9)	98.5 (36.9)	95.7 (35.4)	91.5 (33.1)	83.1 (28.4)	77.9 (25.5)	103.3 (39.6)
Mean daily maximum °F (°C)	60.8 (16.0)	66.3 (19.1)	74.0 (23.3)	81.9 (27.7)	89.3 (31.8)	93.6 (34.2)	92.0 (33.3)	91.2 (32.9)	85.9 (29.9)	79.7 (26.5)	69.0 (20.6)	61.6 (16.4)	78.8 (26.0)
Daily mean °F (°C)	48.8 (9.3)	53.8 (12.1)	60.3 (15.7)	67.8 (19.9)	75.9 (24.4)	81.0 (27.2)	80.7 (27.1)	80.2 (26.8)	74.6 (23.7)	67.3 (19.6)	57.0 (13.9)	49.7 (9.8)	66.4 (19.1)
Mean daily minimum °F (°C)	36.8 (2.7)	41.4 (5.2)	46.6 (8.1)	53.6 (12.0)	62.4 (16.9)	68.3 (20.2)	69.5 (20.8)	69.1 (20.6)	63.3 (17.4)	54.8 (12.7)	44.9 (7.2)	37.7 (3.2)	54.0 (12.2)
Mean minimum °F (°C)	23.9 (−4.5)	26.4 (−3.1)	31.4 (−0.3)	39.5 (4.2)	49.4 (9.7)	60.9 (16.1)	62.9 (17.2)	62.9 (17.2)	53.1 (11.7)	40.1 (4.5)	30.5 (−0.8)	23.9 (−4.5)	20.2 (−6.6)
Record low °F (°C)	4 (−16)	6 (−14)	19 (−7)	29 (−2)	38 (3)	48 (9)	51 (11)	50 (10)	37 (3)	24 (−4)	14 (−10)	4 (−16)	4 (−16)
Average precipitation inches (mm)	0.48 (12)	0.44 (11)	0.39 (9.9)	0.49 (12)	1.30 (33)	1.67 (42)	2.25 (57)	1.93 (49)	1.71 (43)	1.17 (30)	0.70 (18)	0.47 (12)	13.00 (330)
Average snowfall inches (cm)	0.1 (0.25)	0.1 (0.25)	0.0 (0.0)	0.0 (0.0)	0.0 (0.0)	0.0 (0.0)	0.0 (0.0)	0.0 (0.0)	0.0 (0.0)	0.0 (0.0)	0.0 (0.0)	0.2 (0.51)	0.4 (1.0)
Average precipitation days (≥ 0.01 in)	3.1	3.1	1.9	2.3	4.8	6.1	7.3	7.1	5.8	4.3	3.3	2.6	51.7
Average snowy days (≥ 0.1 in)	0.1	0.0	0.0	0.0	0.0	0.0	0.0	0.0	0.0	0.0	0.0	0.1	0.2
Source: NOAA

== Education ==
Map of Brewster County, Texas with school district boundaries

Panther Junction is served by the San Vicente Independent School District, which located its school facility there circa 1951. The district covers most of Big Bend National Park and Southeastern Brewster County. High schoolers zoned to San Vicente ISD attend school in Terlingua Common School District's Big Bend High School.

Previously Alpine High School of the Alpine Independent School District served as the high school for students from San Vicente ISD. In 1996 Big Bend High opened, and San Vicente began sending students to Big Bend High when it was established.
