= Study Butte, Texas =

Census-designates place in Brewster County, Texas, United States

- Census-designated place
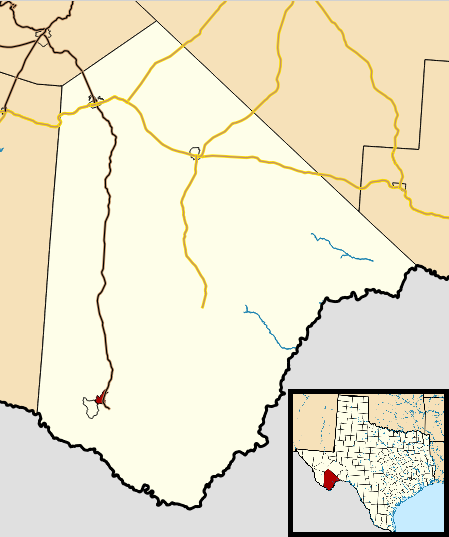
- Location in Brewster County and the state of Texas
- Coordinates: 29°20′06″N 103°32′32″W
- Country: United States
- State: Texas
- County: Brewster

Area
  - Total: 4.7 sq mi (12.3 km^{2})
  - Land: 4.7 sq mi (12.3 km^{2})
  - Water: 0 sq mi (0.0 km^{2})
- Elevation: 2,579 ft (786 m)

Population (2020)
  - Total: 200
  - Density: 42/sq mi (16/km^{2})
- Time zone: UTC-6 (Central (CST))
  - Summer (DST): UTC-5 (CDT)
- FIPS code: 48-70688
- GNIS feature ID: 2584741

Study Butte (/ˈstjuːdi ˌbjuːt/ STEW-dee BEWT) is a census-designated place (CDP) in Brewster County, Texas, United States. The population was 200 at the 2020 census, down from 233 at the 2010 census. At the 2000 census, the area was part of the Study Butte-Terlingua CDP.

== Geography ==
Study Butte is located in southern Brewster County. The Terlingua CDP borders Study Butte to the southwest. Texas State Highway 118 passes through Study Butte and leads 3.7 miles (6.0 km) southeast to the west entrance to Big Bend National Park and 78 miles (126 km) north to the city of Alpine.

According to the United States Census Bureau, the Study Butte CDP has a total area of 4.7 square miles (12.3 km^{2}), all land.

=== Climate ===
This area has a large amount of sunshine year round due to its stable descending air and high pressure. According to the Köppen Climate Classification system, Study Butte-Terlingua has a desert climate, abbreviated "BWh" on climate maps.

Climate data for Study Butte, Texas (May 1, 1993–Jun 30, 2006)
Month	Jan	Feb	Mar	Apr	May	Jun	Jul	Aug	Sep	Oct	Nov	Dec	Year
Record high °F (°C)	88 (31)	94 (34)	101 (38)	107 (42)	111 (44)	113 (45)	111 (44)	108 (42)	106 (41)	102 (39)	96 (36)	85 (29)	113 (45)
Mean daily maximum °F (°C)	69.2 (20.7)	73.2 (22.9)	81.0 (27.2)	88.9 (31.6)	98.2 (36.8)	100.6 (38.1)	99.6 (37.6)	98.2 (36.8)	94.7 (34.8)	86.3 (30.2)	75.7 (24.3)	66.3 (19.1)	86.0 (30.0)
Daily mean °F (°C)	52.8 (11.6)	57.3 (14.1)	64.1 (17.8)	72.1 (22.3)	82.2 (27.9)	86.7 (30.4)	86.6 (30.3)	85.6 (29.8)	81.3 (27.4)	71.7 (22.1)	60.8 (16.0)	51.4 (10.8)	71.1 (21.7)
Mean daily minimum °F (°C)	36.5 (2.5)	41.5 (5.3)	47.3 (8.5)	55.2 (12.9)	66.3 (19.1)	72.9 (22.7)	73.8 (23.2)	73.0 (22.8)	67.9 (19.9)	57.2 (14.0)	45.9 (7.7)	36.5 (2.5)	56.2 (13.4)
Record low °F (°C)	18 (−8)	20 (−7)	21 (−6)	37 (3)	47 (8)	62 (17)	61 (16)	61 (16)	49 (9)	27 (−3)	25 (−4)	16 (−9)	16 (−9)
Average precipitation inches (mm)	0.26 (6.6)	0.17 (4.3)	0.37 (9.4)	0.33 (8.4)	0.63 (16)	1.32 (34)	1.86 (47)	1.77 (45)	0.61 (15)	1.09 (28)	0.47 (12)	0.26 (6.6)	9.14 (232)
Average snowfall inches (cm)	0.0 (0.0)	0.0 (0.0)	0.0 (0.0)	0.0 (0.0)	0.0 (0.0)	0.0 (0.0)	0.0 (0.0)	0.0 (0.0)	0.0 (0.0)	0.0 (0.0)	0.0 (0.0)	0.0 (0.0)	0.0 (0.0)
Average precipitation days (≥ 0.01 in)	1	1	1	1	2	3	5	4	2	2	2	1	25
Source: Western Regional Climate Center, Desert Research Institute

== Demographics ==
Historical population
Census	Pop.	Note	%±
2010	233		—
2020	200		−14.2%
U.S. Decennial Census; 1850–1900 1910; 1920 1930 1940; 1950 1960 1970; 1980 1990 2000; 2010 2020

Study Butte first appeared as a census designated place in the 2010 U.S. census after the Study Butte-Terlingua CDP was split into the Study Butte CDP and the Terlingua CDP.

Study Butte CDP, Texas – Racial and ethnic composition Note: the US Census treats Hispanic/Latino as an ethnic category. This table excludes Latinos from the racial categories and assigns them to a separate category. Hispanics/Latinos may be of any race.
Race / Ethnicity (NH = Non-Hispanic)	Pop 2010	Pop 2020	% 2010	% 2020
White alone (NH)	108	85	46.35%	42.50%
Black or African American alone (NH)	0	0	0.00%	0.00%
Native American or Alaska Native alone (NH)	1	0	0.43%	0.00%
Asian alone (NH)	0	0	0.00%	0.00%
Pacific Islander alone (NH)	0	0	0.00%	0.00%
Other race alone (NH)	1	0	0.43%	0.00%
Mixed race or Multiracial (NH)	0	8	0.00%	4.00%
Hispanic or Latino (any race)	123	107	52.79%	53.50%
Total	233	200	100.00%	100.00%

== Education ==
Study Butte is served by the Terlingua Common School District. Big Bend High School is the local school. Prior to fall 1996, students at the high school level attended Alpine High School in the Alpine Independent School District. Previously the Terlingua CSD had Big Bend High and Terlingua Elementary as separate schools.

== See also ==
- List of census-designated places in Texas
