= Terlingua, Texas =

Census-designated place in Brewster County, Texas, United States

- Census-designated place
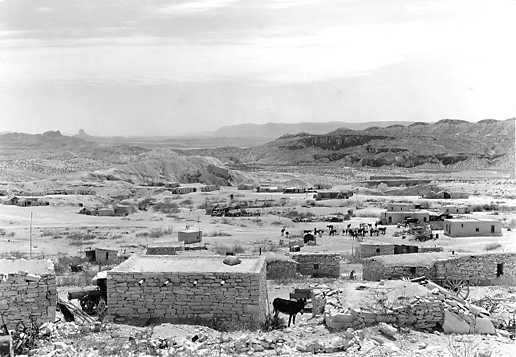
- Terlingua in 1936
- Nickname: Terlingua Ghost Town
- Motto: "The Texas Ghost Town"
- Coordinates: 29°17′57″N 103°34′46″W
- Country: United States
- State: Texas
- County: Brewster

Area
  - Total: 11.0 sq mi (28.5 km^{2})
  - Land: 11.0 sq mi (28.5 km^{2})
  - Water: 0 sq mi (0.0 km^{2})
- Elevation: 2,507 ft (764 m)

Population (2020)
  - Total: 78
  - Density: 7.1/sq mi (2.7/km^{2})
- Time zone: UTC-6 (Central (CST))
  - Summer (DST): UTC-5 (CDT)
- FIPS code: 48-72248
- GNIS feature ID: 2584745

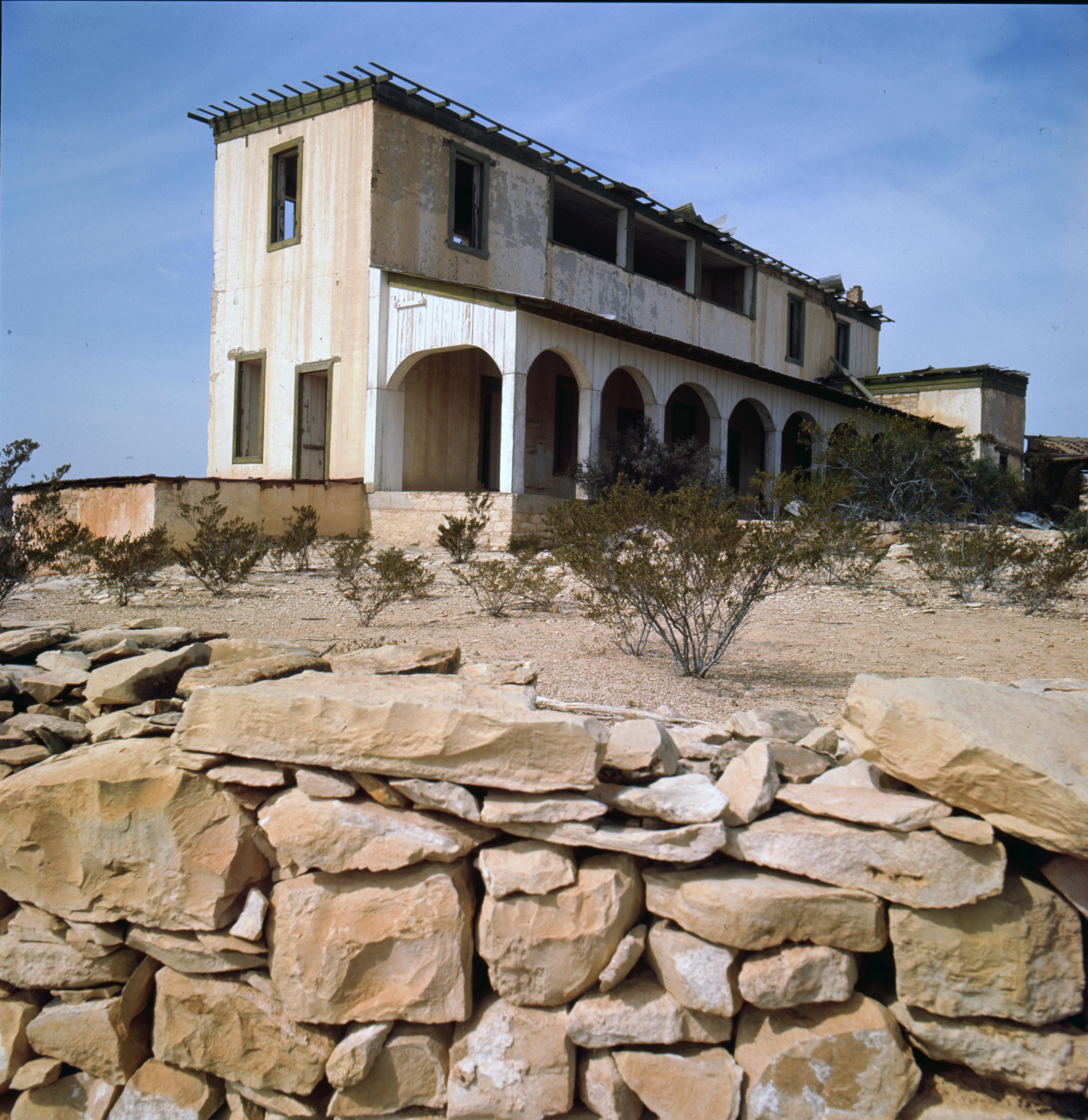
Perry Mansion

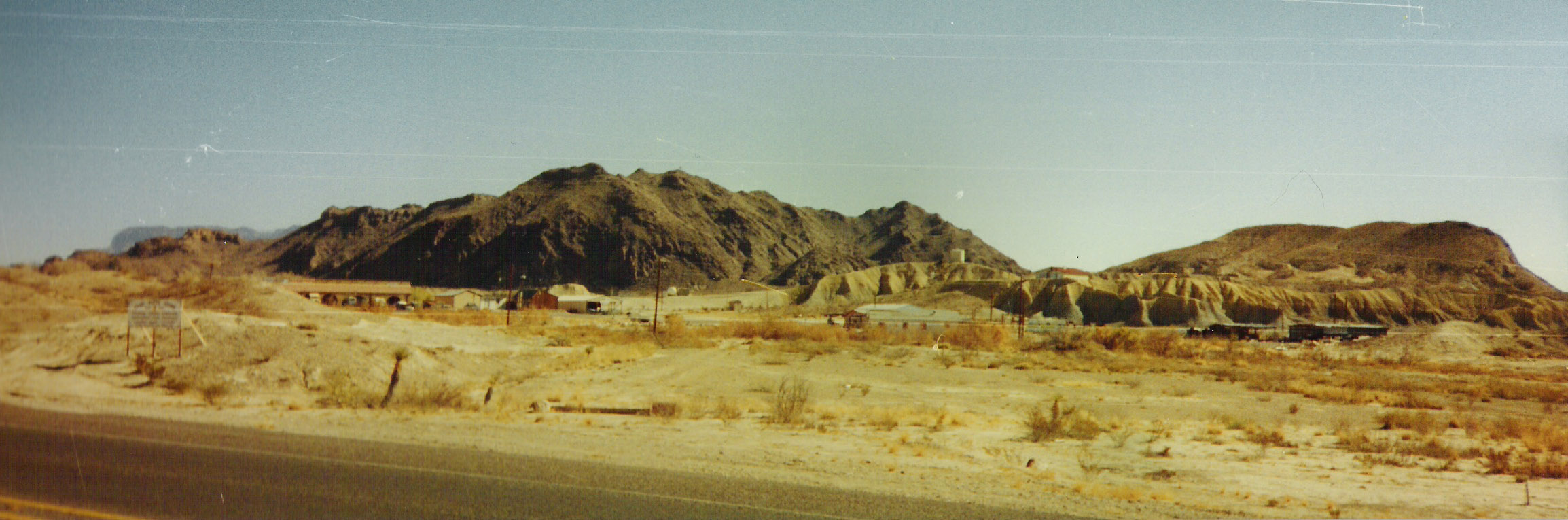
Panoramic view

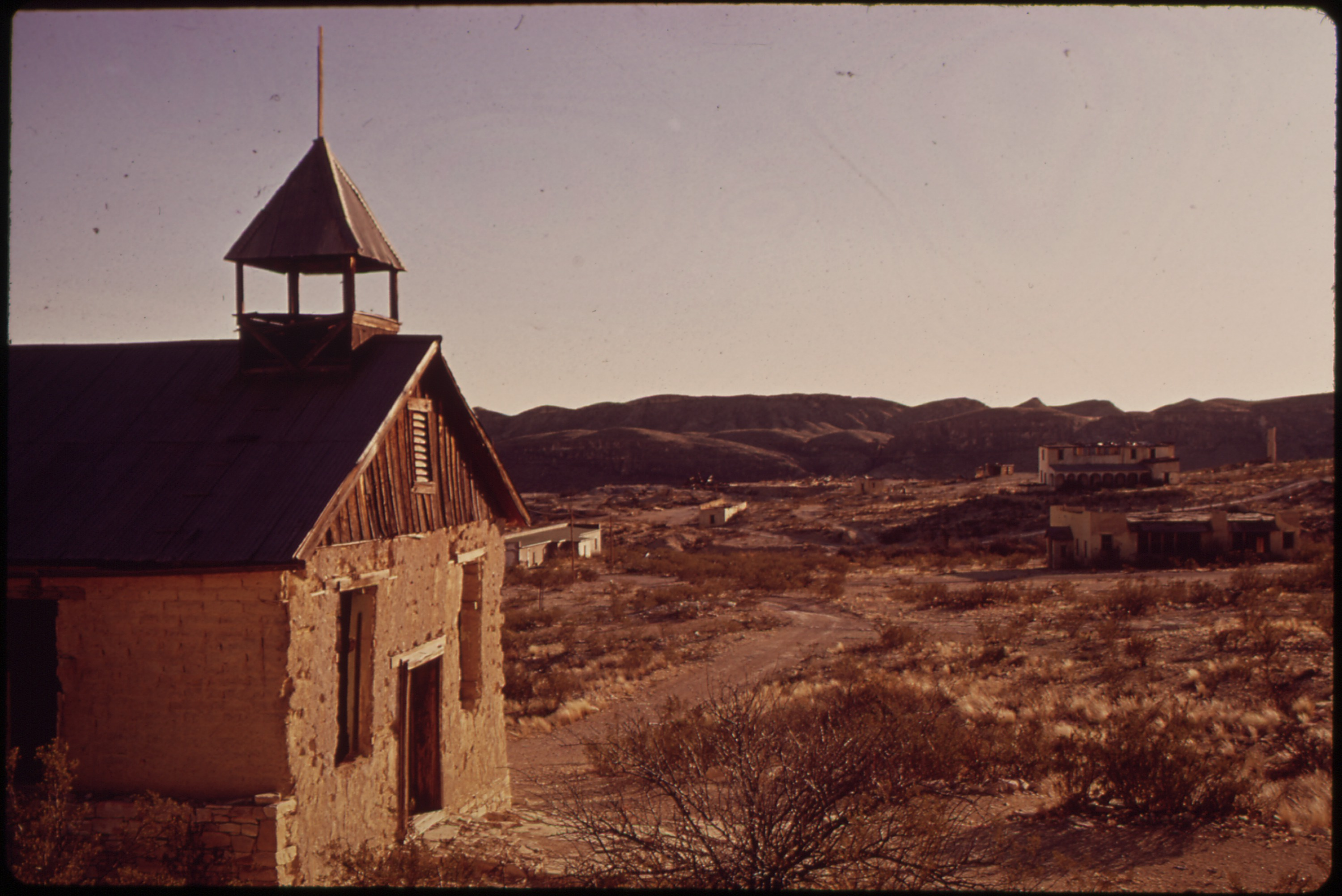
Old Church in Terlingua, 1973

Terlingua (/tərˈlɪŋɡwə/ tər-LING-gwə) is a mining district and census-designated place (CDP) in southwestern Brewster County, Texas, United States. It is located near the Rio Grande and the villages of Lajitas and Study Butte, Texas, as well as the Mexican state of Chihuahua. The discovery of cinnabar, from which the metal mercury is extracted, in the mid-1880s brought miners to the area, creating a city of 2,000 people. The only remnants of the mining days are a ghost town of the Howard Perry-owned Chisos Mining Company and several nearby capped and abandoned mines: the California Hill, the Rainbow, the 248, and the Study Butte mines. The mineral terlinguaite was first found in the vicinity of California Hill.

The population of Terlingua as of 2020 was 78.

== History ==
According to the historian Kenneth Baxter Ragsdale, "Facts concerning the discovery of cinnabar in the Terlingua area are so shrouded in legend and fabrication that it is impossible to cite the date and location of the first quicksilver recovery." The cinnabar was apparently known to Native Americans, who supposedly used its brilliant red color for pictographs.

A man named Jack Dawson reportedly produced the first mercury from Terlingua in 1888, but the district got off to a slow start. The Terlingua finds did not begin to be publicized in newspapers and mining industry magazines until the mid-1890s. By 1900, four mining companies had recovered 1000 flasks in the district: Lindheim and Dewees, Marfa and Mariposa, the California, and the Excelsior. By 1903, they were joined by the Texas Almaden Mining Company, the Big Bend Cinnabar Mining Company, and the Colquitt-Tigner combine.

George W. Wanless and Charles Allen began working the area of California Mountain around 1894 based on reports of Mexican miners from as early as 1850. Ore was found in 1896. Jack Dawson, J.A. Davies and Louis Lindheim soon followed. A Terlingua post office was established in 1899 at the California Mountain mining community. The origin of the name Terlingua may be a corruption of Tres Lenguas (which means "three tongues" in Spanish), in reference to an early mine or local feature. By 1903, 3000 people populated the area. The mining center and post office eventually moved to the area of the Chisos Mine and the original settlement took on the name of Mariposa.

== Howard E. Perry ==
Born on 2 November 1858 in Cleveland, Ohio, Howard E. Perry worked for his father in the Woods-Perry Lumber Company until he was 21. Perry then moved to Chicago in 1881 and started work at C.M. Henderson, eventually rising to the position of director after his marriage to Grace Henderson on 2 February 1897. In 1914, they moved to Portland, Maine.

By 1887, Perry had acquired four sections in Texas, most likely as security on an unpaid debt. Perry was offered increasingly more money for his property, which prompted him to hire the attorney Eugene Cartledge to investigate. Cartledge determined the mining on adjoining property was actually infringing on the Perry property, through an error in a previous survey. Perry's attorneys filed a motion on 8 November 1900, and Perry finally was granted legal possession on 13 May 1901, when the case was decided in his favor. Perry founded the Chisos Mining Company on 8 May 1903 with a $50,000 loan from the Austin National Bank, the same year the company reported its first recovery with two retorts.

Two more retorts were added in 1904 and production amounted to 200 flasks per month. In 1905, the company leased the Colquitt-Tigner 10-ton Scott furnace five miles away. In the same year, Perry hired Dr. William Battle Phillips (future director of the Texas Bureau of Economic Geology and president of the Colorado School of Mines), who taught Perry how to mine. In 1906, they agreed to install a 20-ton Scott furnace.

The furnace was initially heated with mesquite and cottonwood. However, Perry hired geologist Johan August Udden to prospect for coal on his property in 1926. The resultant coal was used to generate producer gas. Water was supplied by Mexican freighters hauling water from the Rio Grande 12 miles away. Some water was also obtained from a dam built on the Terlingua Creek and was hauled 10 miles from springs discovered in the Christmas Mountains and Cigar Mountain. By the mid-1920s, water came from the 800-foot level of the Chisos mine, which was pumped to the surface. Udden was also responsible for discovering the great ore body located in the limestone under the Del Rio clay.

Phillips' departure in the autumn of 1906 began Perry's direct management of the mine. Remarkably, he did this from his Chicago office. In essence, as Ragsdale notes, "Perry first perfected the technique of management in absentia" and "supervision-in-detail became the distinguishing feature of the Chicago-Terlingua correspondence." The book quotes a 1939 letter to Robert Cartledge (Eugene's son who became the mining company's general manager) from the man who ruled Terlingua like a feudal lord from afar, “… no other man in the world could have created Chisos like I had done. And scarcely any man in the world but that would have lost it many years ago.” Perry also received semiweekly telegraphed production reports. These reports and other correspondence used code books to maintain secrecy.

In 1906, Perry built his Perry Mansion based on the Moorish architecture from his visit to Almadén. The two-story structure had nine bedrooms, a wine cellar, nine 10-foot arches, and a 90-foot front porch. By 1913, Perry had installed in Terlingua the Chisos Hotel, a "company store", an ice-making plant, telephone service, a company doctor, and mail delivery three times a week. By 1936, he had installed the Chisos Theatre and the Oasis Confectionery Shop. His mainly Mexican miners were provided rent-free dwellings. Perry joined the New York Yacht Club in 1920. He remained a member until 1944, owning during that time three different yachts, none smaller than 59 feet. In Perry's words, "If he had not wanted the yachts, he would not have made so much money, which he had to do in order to have them." As a consequence, Terlingua became the "Land of Perry", where he controlled all aspects of life.

The beginning of the end to financial prosperity was in sight, however, by 1930, when Perry was forced into a $75,000 settlement with the adjoining Rainbow Mine. The Chisos Mine's No. 9 Shaft had been mining a rich ore body that extended 200 ft into the Rainbow claim. Then in 1934, Perry was forced to increase wages in a settlement with the National Recovery Administration. More disturbing were the accusations that the mine was a "death trap" for miner safety. One of the Chisos geologists, A.R. Fletcher, later testified that the "mine was extremely hot, horribly hot, and there wasn't any provision made for ventilation."

Financial problems with the Chisos mine were compounded when Perry bought the Mariposa mine in 1928 and then the Rainbow Mine in 1938. Though a major ore body in the Mariposa was found by Fletcher in 1935, by 1939, Fletcher reported that the Chisos Mine "had been worked out." Perry further squandered scarce cash on the Bonanza silver mine near Sierra Blanca, Texas, and the Stanley gold mine in Canada. With more accounts becoming delinquent, and creditors becoming more irate, Perry was forced into bankruptcy on 1 October 1942. Perry died not long afterwards, on 6 December 1944.

== Geology ==
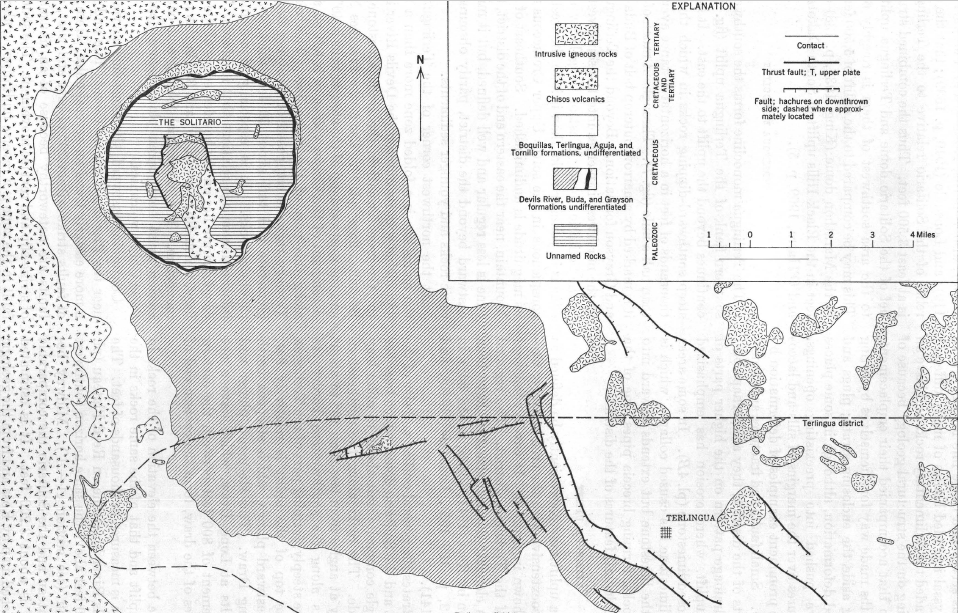
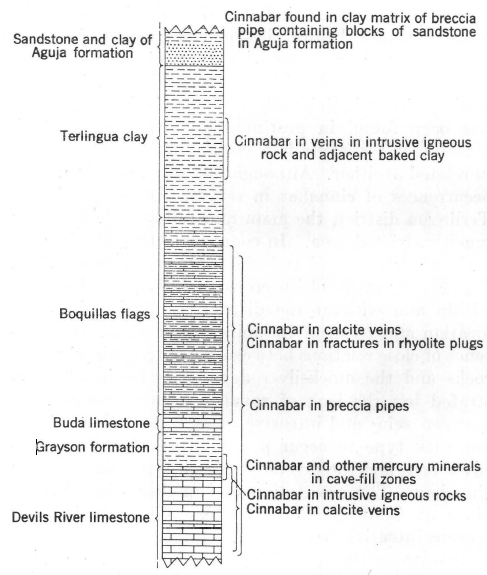
Geological map of the Terlingua area (left), and Stratigraphic column indicating where cinnabar is found (right).

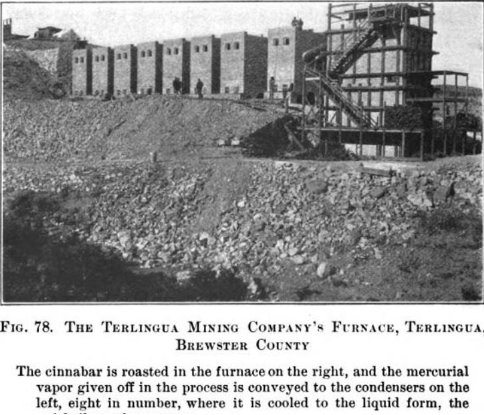
Terlingua's Robert Scott furnace (right) and eight condensers

The regional geology is characterized by the Terlingua Uplift and the Solitario Dome. The southwestern and southern flank of the uplift is marked by the Terlingua Monocline. Cinnabar is the most common ore mineral localized along an east–west trend around Terlingua. It occurs as a replacement mineral and as a filling in rock openings such as fractures in igneous rocks. The most common deposits are along the contact between the Lower Cretaceous Devils River limestone and the Upper Cretaceous Grayson clay formation. The most valuable ore body occurred in the Chisos Pipe in the Chisos Mine.

The Chisos Mine is located in the town of Terlingua and produced most of the quicksilver in the area. Discovered in 1902, it operated until 1943, producing 100,000 flasks of quicksilver. Three shafts connected 23 miles of workings over 17 levels. The mine included a 20-ton Scott furnace and a 100-ton rotary furnace. Cinnabar was discovered near the No. 9 shaft around 1897, the basis for the preceding McKinney-Parker Mine. Peak production of 7,200 flasks occurred in 1917. The mine was operated by Howard E. Perry's Chisos Mining Co. until 1 October 1942, when the company declared insolvency and was purchased by the Esperado Mining Co. The Esperado Mining Co. closed the mine at the end of World War II. The village was abandoned and all company surface property was scrapped. At its peak, the mine employed 125 men around the clock.

The second-most prolific mine in the areas was the Mariposa Mine, located seven miles west of Terlingua. In 1901, the mine was operated by the Marfa and Mariposa Mining Co., owned by Montroyd Shayse and Thomas Golby. That company operated until 1910, when the mine was owned by the Esperado Mining Co. The mine produced between 20,000 and 30,000 flasks of quicksilver, most of it from 1895 to 1911, though production continued through World War II. Most of the production occurred on California Hill in cave-fill zones, which are solution caverns in the Devils River limestone. Calomel is most common.

The third-largest producer of quicksilver in the area was the Study Butte Mine, located five miles east of Terlingua. Cinnabar was discovered here in 1902 and mined from 1905. The property was operated in World War II by the Texas Mercury Co. Cinnabar occurs in ore-bearing fractures or veins within a syenite intrusion. The mine included four principal shafts and two medium-sized furnaces. The mine was soon abandoned when water was encountered, flooding the works.

The district accounted for most of the US quicksilver production at least through 1937, totaling almost 150,000 flasks. However, declining prices forced all of the mines to close by 1947.

== Demographics ==
Historical population
Census	Pop.	Note	%±
2010	58		—
2020	78		34.5%
U.S. Decennial Census; 1850–1900 1910; 1920 1930 1940; 1950 1960 1970; 1980 1990 2000; 2010 2020

Terlingua first appeared as a census-designated place in the 2010 U.S. census after the Study Butte-Terlingua CDP was split into the Study Butte CDP and the Terlingua CDP.

Terlingua CDP, Texas – Racial and ethnic composition Note: the US Census treats Hispanic/Latino as an ethnic category. This table excludes Latinos from the racial categories and assigns them to a separate category. Hispanics/Latinos may be of any race.
Race / Ethnicity (NH = Non-Hispanic)	Pop 2010	Pop 2020	% 2010	% 2020
White alone (NH)	51	64	87.93%	82.05%
Black or African American alone (NH)	0	0	0.00%	0.00%
Native American or Alaska Native alone (NH)	0	0	0.00%	0.00%
Asian alone (NH)	0	0	0.00%	0.00%
Pacific Islander alone (NH)	0	0	0.00%	0.00%
Other race alone (NH)	0	0	0.00%	0.00%
Mixed race or Multiracial (NH)	4	5	6.90%	6.41%
Hispanic or Latino (any race)	3	9	5.17%	11.54%
Total	58	78	100.00%	100.00%

== Culture ==
Due to its proximity to Big Bend National Park, today Terlingua is mostly a tourist destination for park visitors. Rafting and canoeing on the Rio Grande, mountain biking, camping, hiking, and motorcycling are some of the outdoor activities favored by tourists.

On the first Saturday of November, over 10,000 "chiliheads" convene in Terlingua for two annual chili cookoffs: the Chili Appreciation Society International and the Frank X. Tolbert/Wick Fowler World Chili Championship (established 1967). In the late 1970s, the Chili Cook-Off sponsored a “Mexican Fence-Climbing Contest” to spoof the U.S. government's planned reinforcement of the chain-link fence separating El Paso, Texas, from Ciudad Juárez, Mexico, and San Ysidro, California, from Tijuana, Mexico. The fence the “chili heads” used was constructed by undocumented Mexican workers who labored annually for the Cook-Off organizers at $5 a day plus meals and rustic lodging. Among the founders of the first chili cookoff in 1967 was car manufacturer Carroll Shelby, who owned a 220,000-acre (890 km^{2}) ranch nearby.

Near the general store is Terlingua Cemetery, with the earliest grave dating to 1903, when the cinnabar mining operation began. The cemetery continues to be used to this day by Terlingua residents, and Dia de los Muertos is celebrated every year.

Terlingua features in Wim Wenders' movie Paris, Texas. Travis is brought there to the German physician.

Terlingua was the focus of the 2015 National Geographic Channel show Badlands, Texas. The reality show followed the case surrounding the 2014 murder of Glenn Felts.

Terlingua was the main filming location for the 1993 Kenny Rogers TV movie Rio Diablo.

=== Statue of Robert E. Lee on Traveller ===
In 2019, a statue of Robert E. Lee on Traveller was moved from Dallas and installed at a Terlingua golf course owned by Kelcy Warren, near the Mexican border crossing.

== Education ==
Education started with the 1909–1910 school year in a "tent-house". By 1923 the school consisted of 53 students taught in one adobe classroom. Four teachers had joined the staff by the 1927–1928 school year. In 1930 the Chisos Mining Company erected the Perry School. This was a four-room stucco building for the 141 students enrolled in the 1931–1932 school year.

Terlingua is now served by the Terlingua Common School District. Big Bend High School is the local school. Prior to fall 1996 students at the high school level attended Alpine High School in the Alpine Independent School District. Previously the Terlingua CSD had Big Bend High and Terlingua Elementary as separate schools.

Brewster County is within the Odessa College District for community college.

== Climate ==
This area has a large amount of sunshine year round due to its stable descending air and high pressure. The climate is similar to that of nearby Presidio.

== See also ==
- List of census-designated places in Texas
