= Big Bend High School =

Location
- 2281 Road Runner Circle; Terlingua, Texas 79852; United States; 29.315168°N 103.538474°W

Information
- Type: Public high school
- School district: Terlingua Common School District
- Teaching staff: 11.70 (FTE)
- Grades: PK-12
- Enrollment: 132 (2023–2024)
- Student to teacher ratio: 11.28
- Colors: Red and black
- Team name: Roadrunners
- Website: Official website

Big Bend High School is a public K-12 school located in unincorporated Brewster County, Texas, United States, adjacent to the Study Butte census-designated place, and with a Terlingua postal address. Originally a high school, it now serves as the only school in the Terlingua Common School District and is classified as a 1A school by the UIL. For the 2024–2025 school year, the school was given an "F" by the Texas Education Agency.

In addition to the Terlingua CSD area, Big Bend High also serves high school students from San Vicente Independent School District, based at Big Bend National Park. San Vicente itself does not have enough of a taxation base, as of 1997, to establish its own high school.

== History ==
Prior to 1996 Alpine High School of the Alpine Independent School District served as the high school for students from Terlingua CSD. Beginning in the 1960s, students took school buses to and from Alpine, with the bus ride being the longest in the United States, with both directions totaling 160 miles (260 km). Due to the distance, there was a 30% dropout rate among Terlingua area students. From the 1960s there was consideration of establishing a high school for Terlingua area students. The district deliberation over establishing a high school began in 1992. In 1993 San Vicente ISD, which was also sending its high school students to Alpine High, began collaborating with Terlingua CSD.

After an article in The New York Times was published about the ordeals of students being bussed, with the roundtrip distance being 179.6 miles (289.0 km) and with transportation from the dropoff point being as much as 35 miles (56 km), a fundraising drive to build the new high school began in December 1994. The National Enquirer also published a story drawing attention to the issue. Both Terlingua CSD and San Vicente ISD managed to fundraise by May 1996 $148,000. A Dallas Morning News reader donated 320 acres (130 ha) of land to the Big Bend Educational Corporation, a non-profit organization established by area residents, and the organization then sold the land for $18,000. The fencing and the septic tanks were donated by a Fort Stockton hardware store and a firm in Ohio, respectively.

The high school opened in 1996 in temporary buildings. Pressly stated "By most standards, the new facility is tiny". It had 37 students upon opening. San Vicente ISD began sending students to Big Bend High when it was established. Some classes were held outdoors, and high school students shared space with middle school students. The opening was prompted by district officials getting the financing in place to establish a high school. In 1997 the school had 45 students. Funded with donations and what Sue Ann Pressly of the Los Angeles Times called "the thinnest of shoestring budgets", it had six classrooms and a total cost of $550,000. In 1998 there were two graduates, the smallest graduating size in the state.

The 2004 book Tales from the Times stated that because the economy and population of the Big Bend area was trending upwards, Big Bend High would be "an increasingly sustainable proposition."

== Athletics ==
The Big Bend Roadrunners compete in cross country, golf, basketball, and track and field.

== See also ==
Other high schools in Brewster County:

- Alpine High School
- Marathon High School
