= Quercus graciliformis =

Conservation status
- Critically Endangered (IUCN 3.1)

Scientific classification
- Kingdom: Plantae
- Clade: Embryophytes
- Clade: Tracheophytes
- Clade: Spermatophytes
- Clade: Angiosperms
- Clade: Eudicots
- Clade: Rosids
- Order: Fagales
- Family: Fagaceae
- Genus: Quercus
- Subgenus: Quercus subg. Quercus
- Section: Quercus sect. Lobatae
- Species: Q. graciliformis

Binomial name
- Quercus graciliformis C.H.Mull.
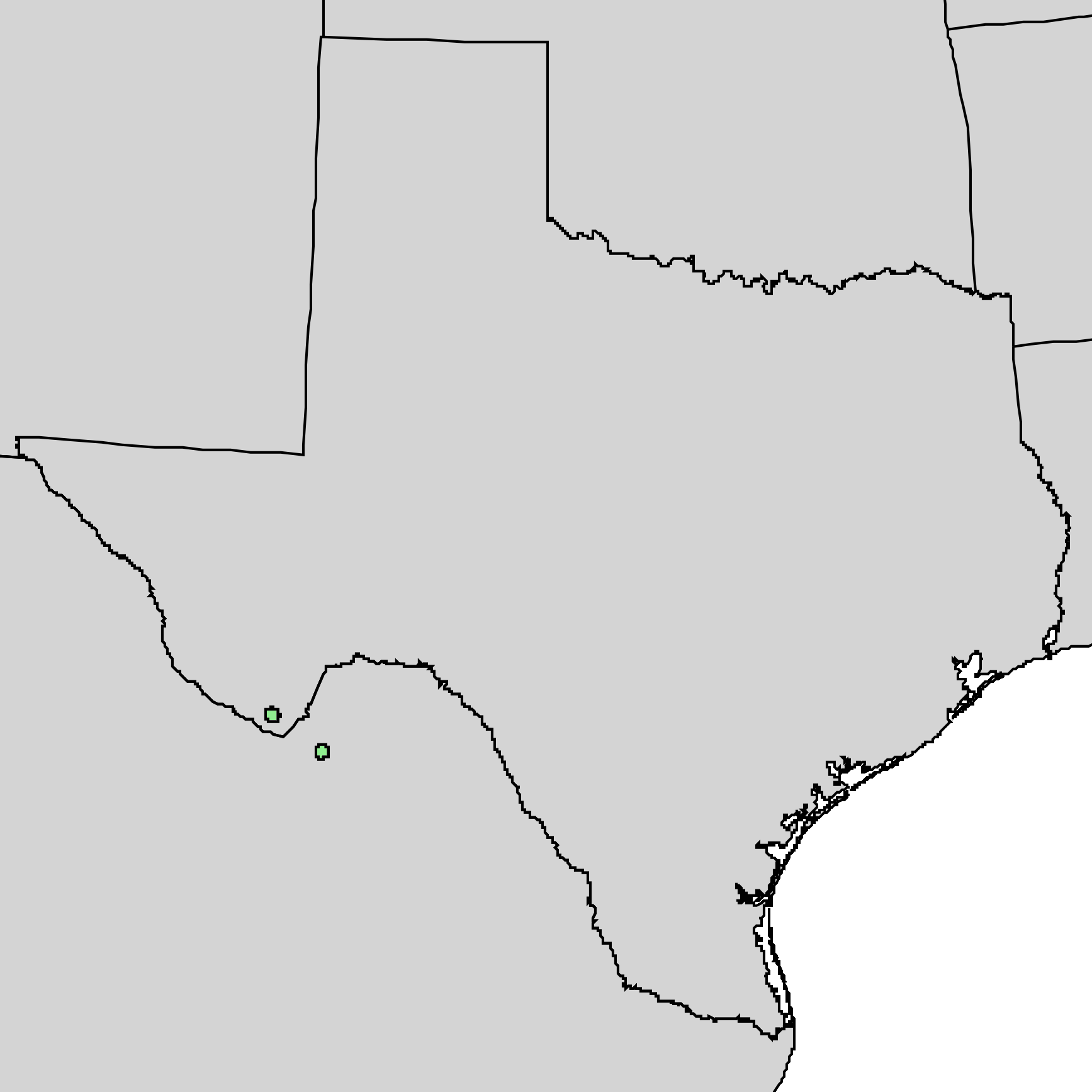
- Natural range of Quercus graciliformis

Species of tree

Quercus graciliformis (also known as the Chisos oak or slender oak) is a rare North American species of oak tree.

== Description ==
Quercus graciliformis is a deciduous tree up to 8 metres (26 feet) tall. The leaves are elliptical or lance-shaped with 8–10 shallow lobes. The acorns are produced biennially.

== Distribution ==
The species has been found only in the Chisos Mountains, within Big Bend National Park of West Texas. It may also be native the state of Coahuila in northeast Mexico. It is threatened by habitat loss.

It grows on dry, rocky canyon floors at elevations above 1,500 m (5,000 ft).
