= Alpine High School =

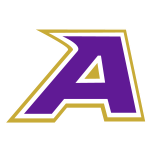

Location
- 300 East Hendryx Drive; Alpine, Texas 79830; United States
- 30.371503°N 103.665788°W

Information
- School type: Public high school
- School district: Alpine Independent School District
- NCES School ID: 480795000124
- Principal: Luane Porter
- Teaching staff: 28.27 (on an FTE basis)
- Grades: 9–12
- Enrollment: 303 (2023–2024)
- Student to teacher ratio: 10.72
- Colors: Purple and gold
- Athletics conference: UIL Class 3A
- Mascot: Bucks/Lady Bucks
- USNWR ranking: 332 in Texas; 4,071 in U.S.
- STAAR EOC Assessments average: 79.7%
- Yearbook: El Ocotillo
- Website: alpine.esc18.net/high-school

Alpine High School is a public high school located in the city of Alpine, Texas (USA) and is classified as a 3A school by the UIL. It is a part of the Alpine Independent School District located in north-central Brewster County. For the 2024-2025 school year, the school was given a "B" by the Texas Education Agency.

== History ==
In 1994 the school had 350 students.

Prior to 1996 Alpine High School served as the high school for students from Terlingua Common School District. Beginning in the 1960s, students were bussed to Alpine, with the bus ride being the longest in the United States, with 89.7 miles (144.4 km) of distance each way, totaling about one hour and 55 minutes. A trip to and from Alpine High totaled 179.6 miles (289.0 km). In 1994 about 24 students took this bus. Some students then traveled to and/or from the drop-off point as additionally far as 35 miles (56 km) to and/or from their residences each way. This means adding an additional 45 minutes each way, which involved parents having to wake up early. Due to the distance and because there was only one bus each day, Terlingua area students could not participate in extracurricular activities after school. Additionally there was a 30% dropout rate among Terlingua area students. Additionally San Vicente Independent School District sent its high school students to Alpine High. In 1996 Big Bend High School opened in temporary facilities, and the Terlingua area students no longer came to Alpine High. The same year San Vicente ISD students were also redirected to Big Bend High.

== Service area ==
Currently, the high school serves Alpine. Residents of the Sul Ross State University family housing units, Lobo Village 5 through 7, are zoned to Alpine ISD schools.

Prior to 1996, the school served, in addition to Alpine, Lajitas, Panther Junction, and Terlingua. The San Vicente and Terlingua districts include Big Bend National Park.

== Academic awards ==
- UIL Team Debate Champions
  - 1960 (2A) Boys, 1962 (2A) Girls

== Athletics ==
The Alpine Bucks compete in the following sports.

- Baseball
- Basketball
- Cross Country
- Football
- Golf
- Powerlifting
- Softball
- Tennis
- Track and Field
- Volleyball

=== State Titles ===
- Boys Golf
  - 1965 (2A)
- Girls Golf
  - 1986 (3A)

==== State Finalist ====
- Baseball
  - 1994(3A)
- Volleyball
  - 1985 (3A), 1986 (3A)

== Theater ==
- One Act Play
  - 1958 (B)

== 2016 shooting ==
On September 8, 2016, a female student shot and injured another student in a school hallway and then committed suicide in the bathroom. A Homeland Security officer who responded to the shooting was accidentally shot by a U.S. Marshal during the incident.

== See also ==
Other high schools in Brewster County:

- Marathon High School
