= Terlingua Common School District =

School district in Texas, United States

Terlingua Common School District (TCSD) is a public school district based in unincorporated Brewster County, in the U.S. state of Texas. Its only school, Big Bend High School, is located adjacent to the Study Butte census-designated place, and with a Terlingua postal address.

The district, which also serves Lajitas, has one school — Big Bend High School, for grades K-12. Previously it was administratively divided between Big Bend High and Terlingua Elementary (Grades K–8). Previously the elementary school was called the "Terlingua Common School".

== History ==
As of 2007, the Texas State Energy Conservation Office awards Terlingua ISD money due to the colonias served by the district.

In 2009, the school district was rated "academically acceptable" by the Texas Education Agency.

== Operations ==
In 1996 Sam Howe Verhovek of The New York Times wrote that "The district is still extremely poor, though it is growing".

== Service area ==
Its service area includes Terlingua, Study Butte, and Lajitas. Big Bend High School also takes high-schoolers within the San Vicente Independent School District, which serves residents from K through 8. San Vicente ISD is based in Panther Junction, and Big Bend High school accordingly serves Panther Junction as well.

Prior to fall 1996 Alpine High School of the Alpine Independent School District served as the high school for students from Terlingua CSD, with the bus ride being the longest in the United States. In 1996 Big Bend High School opened. San Vicente began sending students to Big Bend High when it was established in 1996; San Vicente itself does not have enough of a taxation base, as of 1996, to establish its own high school.

== See also ==
- Non-high school district (Regarding the pre-1996 period)
