= Alpine Independent School District =

School district in Texas

Location
- 704 W Sul Ross Ave. Alpine, Texas ESC Region 18 United States
- Coordinates: 30°21′26″N 103°40′6″W

District information
- Type: Independent school district
- Grades: Pre-K through 12
- Superintendent: Michelle Rinehart
- Schools: 3 (2009-10)
- NCES District ID: 4807950

Students and staff
- Students: 1,108 (2010-11)
- Teachers: 89.6 (2009-10) (on full-time equivalent (FTE) basis)
- Student–teacher ratio: 11.9 (2009-10)
- Athletic conference: UIL Class 2A Football Division II
- District mascot: Bucks
- Colors: Purple and gold

Other information
- TEA District Accountability Rating for 2011-12: Recognized
- Website: Alpine ISD

The Alpine Independent School District is a school district based in Alpine, Texas, United States. The district operates one high school, Alpine High School.

== History ==
Prior to 1996 Alpine High School served as the high school for students from Terlingua Common School District. Beginning in the 1960s, students were bussed to Alpine, with the bus ride being the longest in the United States. San Vicente Independent School District also sent its high school students to Alpine High. In 1996 Big Bend High School opened and the Terlingua area students no longer came to Alpine High. San Vicente ISD at that time began using Big Bend High.

== Finances ==
As of the 2010-2011 school year, the appraised valuation of property in the district was $380,110,000. The maintenance tax rate was $0.117 and the bond tax rate was $0.009 per $100 of appraised valuation.

== Academic achievement ==
In 2011, the school district was rated "Recognized" by the Texas Education Agency. Thirty-five percent of districts in Texas in 2011 received the same rating. No state accountability ratings will be given to districts in 2012. A school district in Texas can receive one of four possible rankings from the Texas Education Agency: Exemplary (the highest possible ranking), Recognized, Academically Acceptable, and Academically Unacceptable (the lowest possible ranking).

Historical district TEA accountability ratings:

- 2011: Recognized
- 2010: Recognized
- 2009: Recognized
- 2008: Academically Acceptable
- 2007: Academically Acceptable
- 2006: Academically Acceptable
- 2005: Recognized
- 2004: Recognized

== Service area ==
Currently the district serves Alpine. Residents of the Sul Ross State University family housing units, Lobo Village 5 through 7, are zoned to Alpine ISD schools.

Prior to 1996 for the high school level Alpine ISD served, in addition to Alpine, Lajitas, Panther Junction, and Terlingua. The San Vicente and Terlingua districts include Big Bend National Park.

== Schools ==
In the 2011-2012 school year the district operated three schools:

- Alpine High School (grades 9-12)
- Alpine Middle School (grades 5-8)
- Alpine Elementary School (grades PK-4)

== Special programs ==
=== Athletics ===
Alpine High School offers boys' baseball, basketball, football, powerlifting, golf, and wrestling; and girls' basketball, softball, powerlifting, golf, and volleyball. For the 2012 through 2014 school years, Alpine High School played football in UIL Class 2A Division II. The Alpine High School teams are known as the Fightn' Bucks and Lady Bucks.

== See also ==
- List of school districts in Texas
- List of high schools in Texas
