= Frank X. Tolbert =

American journalist

Joseph Francis Tolbert (July 27, 1912 – January 10, 1984), better known as Frank X. Tolbert, was an American journalist, historian, and chili enthusiast from Texas. For the Dallas Morning News, he wrote a local history column called Tolbert's Texas that ran from 1946 until his death in 1984.

== Biography ==
Tolbert was born in Amarillo, and was raised in Wichita Falls and Canyon. He attended various colleges, but never received a degree. He worked as a sports writer for the Lubbock Avalanche-Journal, the Wichita Falls Times Record News, and the Fort Worth Star-Telegram. He also wrote articles that were published in Leatherneck Magazine, Collier's, Esquire, and the Saturday Evening Post. He served in the U.S. Marine Corps during World War II, and married Kathleen Hoover in December 1943. In 1946 he joined the Dallas Morning News, and became a regular columnist on Texas topics, including colorful Texas people from all walks of life.

He was also a food connoisseur, wrote a history of chili con carne called A Bowl of Red, and ran a chili restaurant in Dallas called Tolbert's. In 1967 he founded, with Wick Fowler, the World Chili Championship held annually in Terlingua, Texas, which was later named for them. He appeared in several television commercials for Dennison's canned chili during the late 1970s.

He died of heart failure at age 71. His son, Frank X. Tolbert II, is an artist and chili chef. His daughter, Kathleen Tolbert Ryan, re-opened a Tolbert's Restaurant in May 2006 on Main Street in Grapevine, Texas. Tolbert's Restaurant serves Frank X. Tolbert's famous chili recipe and has been named one of the "52 things Every Dallasite Must Do" by D Magazine as well as one of the best chili spots in America by Bon Appétit magazine.

== Books ==
=== Fiction ===
- Bigamy Jones (1954)
- The Staked Plain (1958) with Tom Pilkington, 1987, Southern Methodist University Press reprint, ISBN 978-0-87074-253-8.

=== Non-fiction ===
- An Informal History of Texas (1951)
- Neiman-Marcus, Texas (1953)
- The Day of San Jacinto (1959) Jenkins Publishing.
- Dick Dowling at Sabine Pass (1962)
- A Bowl of Red (1972) Doubleday, ISBN 978-0-385-05763-9.
- Tolbert's Texas (1983) Doubleday, ISBN 0-385-08582-6, ISBN 978-0-385-08582-3.
- Tolbert of Texas: the Man and His Work (1986) ed. by Evelyn Oppenheimer, TCU Press, ISBN 0-87565-068-6, ISBN 978-0-87565-068-5.
