= Big Bend National Park =

U.S. national park located in West Texas, bordering Mexico

Big Bend
- IUCN category II (national park)
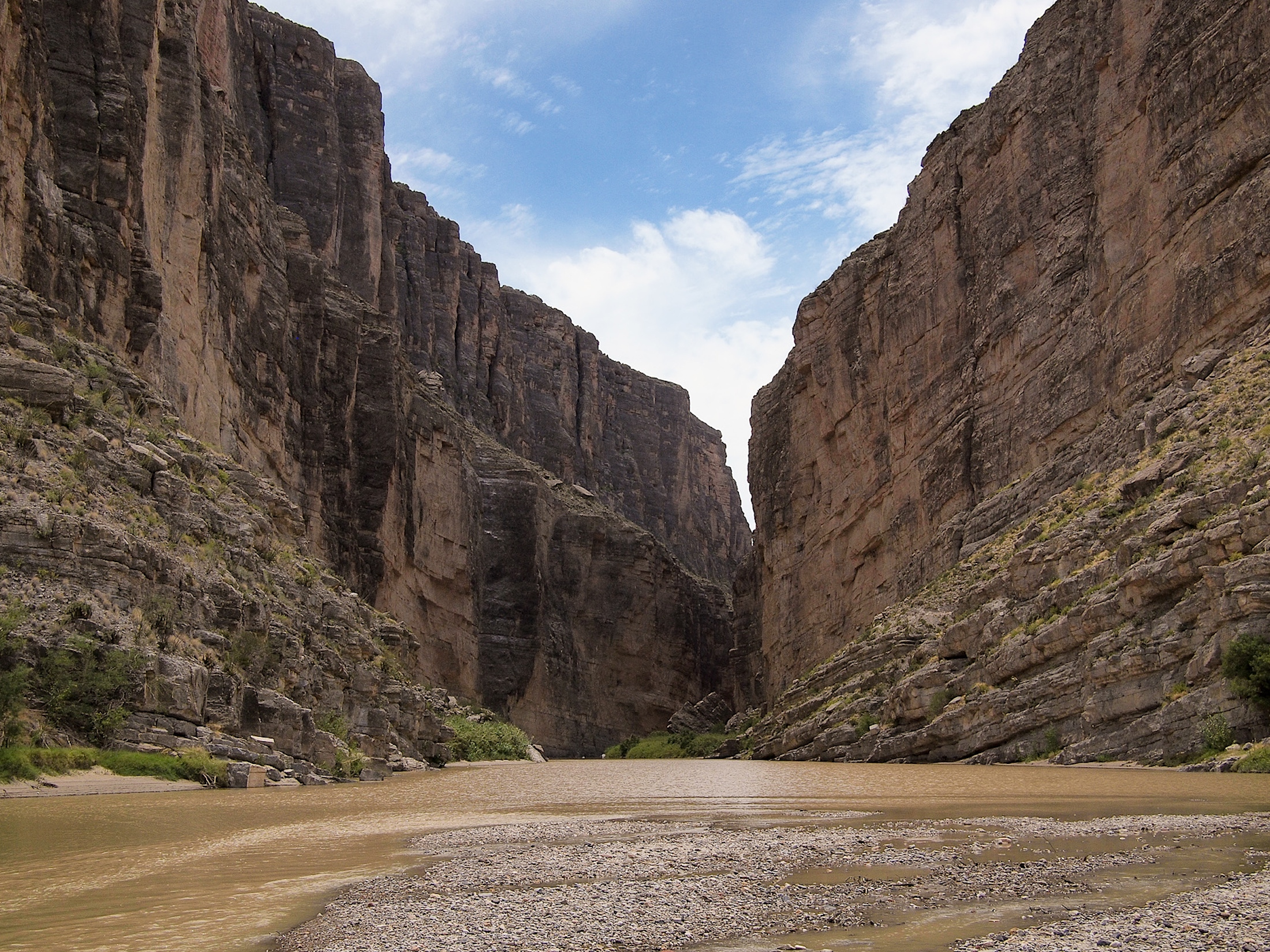
- The Rio Grande runs through Cañón de Santa Elena, Mexico, on the left and Big Bend National Park, U.S., on the right.
- Interactive map of Big Bend
- Location: Brewster County, Texas, United States
- Nearest city: Alpine
- Coordinates: 29°15′0″N 103°15′0″W
- Length: 4 km (2.5 mi)
- Area: 801,163 acres (3,242.19 km^{2})
- Established: June 12, 1944; 82 years ago
- Visitors: 568,104 (in 2025)
- Operator: National Park Service
- Website: nps.gov/bibe/

Big Bend National Park is a national park of the United States located in West Texas, bordering Mexico. The park has national significance as the largest protected area of Chihuahuan Desert topography and ecology in the United States, and was named after a large bend in the Rio Grande/Río Bravo. The park protects more than 1,200 species of plants, more than 450 species of birds, 56 species of reptiles, and 75 species of mammals.

The area has a rich cultural history, from archeological sites dating back nearly 10,000 years to more recent pioneers, ranchers, and miners. The Chisos Mountains are located in the park, and are the only mountain range in the United States to be fully contained within the boundary of a national park. Geological features in the park include sea fossils and dinosaur bones, as well as volcanic dikes.

The park encompasses 801,163 acres (1,251.8 sq mi; 3,242.2 km^{2}), entirely within Brewster County. For more than 1,000 miles (1,600 km), the Rio Grande/Río Bravo forms the boundary between Mexico and the United States, and Big Bend National Park administers approximately 118 miles (190 km) along that boundary.

Because the Rio Grande serves as an international boundary, the park faces unusual constraints while administering and enforcing park rules, regulations, and policies. In accordance with the Treaty of Guadalupe Hidalgo, the park's territory extends only to the center of the deepest river channel as the river flowed in 1848. The rest of the channel and the land south of it lie within Mexican territory. The park is bordered by the protected areas of Cañón de Santa Elena and Maderas del Carmen in Mexico.

== Geography and climate ==
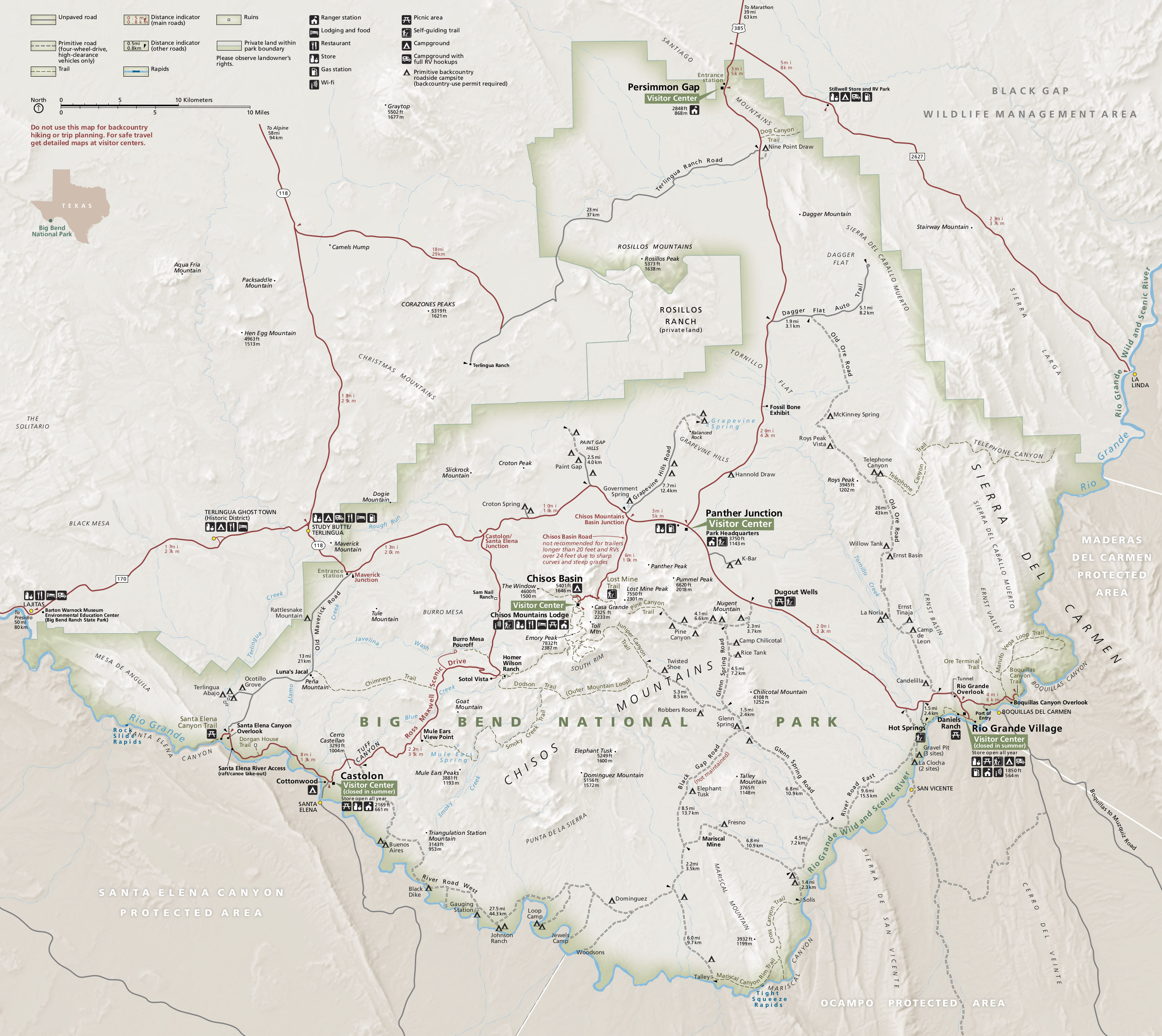
Park map

The park is in an unincorporated area of Brewster County, Texas.

According to the Köppen climate classification system, Big Bend National Park has a hot arid climate (BWh).

Dry, hot late-spring and summer days often exceed 100 °F (38 °C) at lower elevations. Winters are normally mild, but subfreezing temperatures occasionally occur. Because of the range in altitude from about 1,800 feet (550 m) along the river to Emory Peak in the Chisos Mountains at 7,832 feet (2,387 m), a wide variation in available moisture and temperature exists throughout the park. These variations contribute to an exceptional diversity in plant and animal habitats. Some species in the park, such as the Chisos oak (Quercus graciliformis), are found nowhere else in the United States.

The 118 mi (190 km) of rivers that form the southern boundary of the park include the spectacular canyons of Santa Elena, Mariscal, and Boquillas. The Rio Grande, which meanders through this portion of the Chihuahuan Desert, has cut deep canyons with nearly vertical walls through three uplifts made primarily of limestone. Throughout the open desert areas, the highly productive Rio Grande riparian zone includes numerous plant and animal species and significant cultural resources. The vegetative belt extends into the desert along creeks and arroyos.

The park's Chisos Mountains are sky islands surrounded by desert. A significant part of the park's biodiversity is represented by isolated populations of plants and animals found in the Chisos Mountains and in many of the desert springs distributed across the park.

South of the border lie the Mexican states of Chihuahua and Coahuila, as well as newly protected areas for flora and fauna, known as the Maderas del Carmen and the Cañón de Santa Elena.

Climate data for Panther Junction, Texas, 1991–2020 normals, extremes 1955–present
Month	Jan	Feb	Mar	Apr	May	Jun	Jul	Aug	Sep	Oct	Nov	Dec	Year
Record high °F (°C)	83 (28)	91 (33)	95 (35)	100 (38)	105 (41)	109 (43)	108 (42)	105 (41)	103 (39)	99 (37)	92 (33)	85 (29)	109 (43)
Mean maximum °F (°C)	77.4 (25.2)	82.5 (28.1)	87.9 (31.1)	93.9 (34.4)	99.7 (37.6)	102.5 (39.2)	100.2 (37.9)	98.5 (36.9)	95.7 (35.4)	91.5 (33.1)	83.1 (28.4)	77.9 (25.5)	103.3 (39.6)
Mean daily maximum °F (°C)	60.8 (16.0)	66.3 (19.1)	74.0 (23.3)	81.9 (27.7)	89.3 (31.8)	93.6 (34.2)	92.0 (33.3)	91.2 (32.9)	85.9 (29.9)	79.7 (26.5)	69.0 (20.6)	61.6 (16.4)	78.8 (26.0)
Daily mean °F (°C)	48.8 (9.3)	53.8 (12.1)	60.3 (15.7)	67.8 (19.9)	75.9 (24.4)	81.0 (27.2)	80.7 (27.1)	80.2 (26.8)	74.6 (23.7)	67.3 (19.6)	57.0 (13.9)	49.7 (9.8)	66.4 (19.1)
Mean daily minimum °F (°C)	36.8 (2.7)	41.4 (5.2)	46.6 (8.1)	53.6 (12.0)	62.4 (16.9)	68.3 (20.2)	69.5 (20.8)	69.1 (20.6)	63.3 (17.4)	54.8 (12.7)	44.9 (7.2)	37.7 (3.2)	54.0 (12.2)
Mean minimum °F (°C)	23.9 (−4.5)	26.4 (−3.1)	31.4 (−0.3)	39.5 (4.2)	49.4 (9.7)	60.9 (16.1)	62.9 (17.2)	62.9 (17.2)	53.1 (11.7)	40.1 (4.5)	30.5 (−0.8)	23.9 (−4.5)	20.2 (−6.6)
Record low °F (°C)	4 (−16)	6 (−14)	19 (−7)	29 (−2)	38 (3)	48 (9)	51 (11)	50 (10)	37 (3)	24 (−4)	14 (−10)	4 (−16)	4 (−16)
Average precipitation inches (mm)	0.48 (12)	0.44 (11)	0.39 (9.9)	0.49 (12)	1.30 (33)	1.67 (42)	2.25 (57)	1.93 (49)	1.71 (43)	1.17 (30)	0.70 (18)	0.47 (12)	13.00 (330)
Average snowfall inches (cm)	0.1 (0.25)	0.1 (0.25)	0.0 (0.0)	0.0 (0.0)	0.0 (0.0)	0.0 (0.0)	0.0 (0.0)	0.0 (0.0)	0.0 (0.0)	0.0 (0.0)	0.0 (0.0)	0.2 (0.51)	0.4 (1.0)
Average precipitation days (≥ 0.01 in)	3.1	3.1	1.9	2.3	4.8	6.1	7.3	7.1	5.8	4.3	3.3	2.6	51.7
Average snowy days (≥ 0.1 in)	0.1	0.0	0.0	0.0	0.0	0.0	0.0	0.0	0.0	0.0	0.0	0.1	0.2
Source: NOAA

Climate data for Castolon, Texas, 1991–2020 normals, extremes 1947–present
Month	Jan	Feb	Mar	Apr	May	Jun	Jul	Aug	Sep	Oct	Nov	Dec	Year
Record high °F (°C)	92 (33)	98 (37)	105 (41)	109 (43)	115 (46)	117 (47)	115 (46)	114 (46)	110 (43)	105 (41)	99 (37)	93 (34)	117 (47)
Mean maximum °F (°C)	84.4 (29.1)	91.0 (32.8)	98.0 (36.7)	103.5 (39.7)	109.3 (42.9)	112.9 (44.9)	110.5 (43.6)	108.5 (42.5)	104.8 (40.4)	100.5 (38.1)	92.1 (33.4)	83.6 (28.7)	113.3 (45.2)
Mean daily maximum °F (°C)	68.9 (20.5)	75.4 (24.1)	83.3 (28.5)	92.2 (33.4)	99.9 (37.7)	104.3 (40.2)	102.2 (39.0)	101.7 (38.7)	96.0 (35.6)	89.3 (31.8)	77.7 (25.4)	69.1 (20.6)	88.3 (31.3)
Daily mean °F (°C)	52.4 (11.3)	58.5 (14.7)	65.8 (18.8)	74.6 (23.7)	83.4 (28.6)	89.4 (31.9)	88.8 (31.6)	88.5 (31.4)	82.9 (28.3)	74.2 (23.4)	61.6 (16.4)	52.9 (11.6)	72.8 (22.6)
Mean daily minimum °F (°C)	35.9 (2.2)	41.6 (5.3)	48.3 (9.1)	57.0 (13.9)	67.0 (19.4)	74.5 (23.6)	75.4 (24.1)	75.2 (24.0)	69.8 (21.0)	59.1 (15.1)	45.6 (7.6)	36.8 (2.7)	57.2 (14.0)
Mean minimum °F (°C)	24.8 (−4.0)	28.2 (−2.1)	35.1 (1.7)	43.9 (6.6)	54.8 (12.7)	65.5 (18.6)	68.3 (20.2)	68.3 (20.2)	58.5 (14.7)	43.6 (6.4)	31.6 (−0.2)	24.7 (−4.1)	21.9 (−5.6)
Record low °F (°C)	7 (−14)	5 (−15)	22 (−6)	28 (−2)	44 (7)	56 (13)	60 (16)	64 (18)	47 (8)	29 (−2)	21 (−6)	7 (−14)	5 (−15)
Average precipitation inches (mm)	0.36 (9.1)	0.33 (8.4)	0.29 (7.4)	0.37 (9.4)	0.79 (20)	1.38 (35)	1.71 (43)	1.51 (38)	1.55 (39)	0.81 (21)	0.48 (12)	0.28 (7.1)	9.86 (249.4)
Average precipitation days (≥ 0.01 in)	2.5	1.9	1.4	1.8	3.9	4.8	6.4	4.9	4.7	3.4	1.8	2.4	39.9
Source 1: NOAA
Source 2: National Weather Service

Climate data for Chisos Basin, Texas, 1991–2020 normals, extremes 1947–present
Month	Jan	Feb	Mar	Apr	May	Jun	Jul	Aug	Sep	Oct	Nov	Dec	Year
Record high °F (°C)	82 (28)	84 (29)	96 (36)	96 (36)	99 (37)	103 (39)	102 (39)	100 (38)	97 (36)	94 (34)	89 (32)	87 (31)	103 (39)
Mean maximum °F (°C)	71.0 (21.7)	75.4 (24.1)	80.5 (26.9)	86.1 (30.1)	92.4 (33.6)	94.6 (34.8)	91.6 (33.1)	89.7 (32.1)	87.1 (30.6)	83.2 (28.4)	76.1 (24.5)	70.8 (21.6)	95.4 (35.2)
Mean daily maximum °F (°C)	58.1 (14.5)	62.6 (17.0)	68.8 (20.4)	76.4 (24.7)	83.1 (28.4)	86.9 (30.5)	84.8 (29.3)	83.9 (28.8)	79.1 (26.2)	74.1 (23.4)	65.2 (18.4)	59.0 (15.0)	73.5 (23.1)
Daily mean °F (°C)	48.0 (8.9)	51.7 (10.9)	57.1 (13.9)	64.3 (17.9)	71.6 (22.0)	75.9 (24.4)	74.9 (23.8)	74.2 (23.4)	69.5 (20.8)	63.8 (17.7)	54.9 (12.7)	48.9 (9.4)	62.9 (17.2)
Mean daily minimum °F (°C)	37.9 (3.3)	40.8 (4.9)	45.5 (7.5)	52.3 (11.3)	60.1 (15.6)	64.8 (18.2)	65.0 (18.3)	64.6 (18.1)	59.9 (15.5)	53.5 (11.9)	44.6 (7.0)	38.9 (3.8)	52.3 (11.3)
Mean minimum °F (°C)	22.6 (−5.2)	25.7 (−3.5)	30.4 (−0.9)	36.5 (2.5)	46.4 (8.0)	57.0 (13.9)	59.2 (15.1)	59.0 (15.0)	50.0 (10.0)	37.0 (2.8)	28.0 (−2.2)	22.6 (−5.2)	18.4 (−7.6)
Record low °F (°C)	−3 (−19)	1 (−17)	12 (−11)	25 (−4)	30 (−1)	45 (7)	53 (12)	52 (11)	34 (1)	19 (−7)	13 (−11)	4 (−16)	−3 (−19)
Average precipitation inches (mm)	0.58 (15)	0.61 (15)	0.50 (13)	0.59 (15)	1.58 (40)	2.74 (70)	3.57 (91)	3.06 (78)	2.72 (69)	1.29 (33)	0.63 (16)	0.46 (12)	18.33 (467)
Average precipitation days (≥ 0.01 in)	3.2	3.1	2.4	2.6	5.2	7.3	9.4	8.7	7.3	4.7	3.7	2.7	60.3
Source 1: NOAA
Source 2: National Weather Service

== History ==
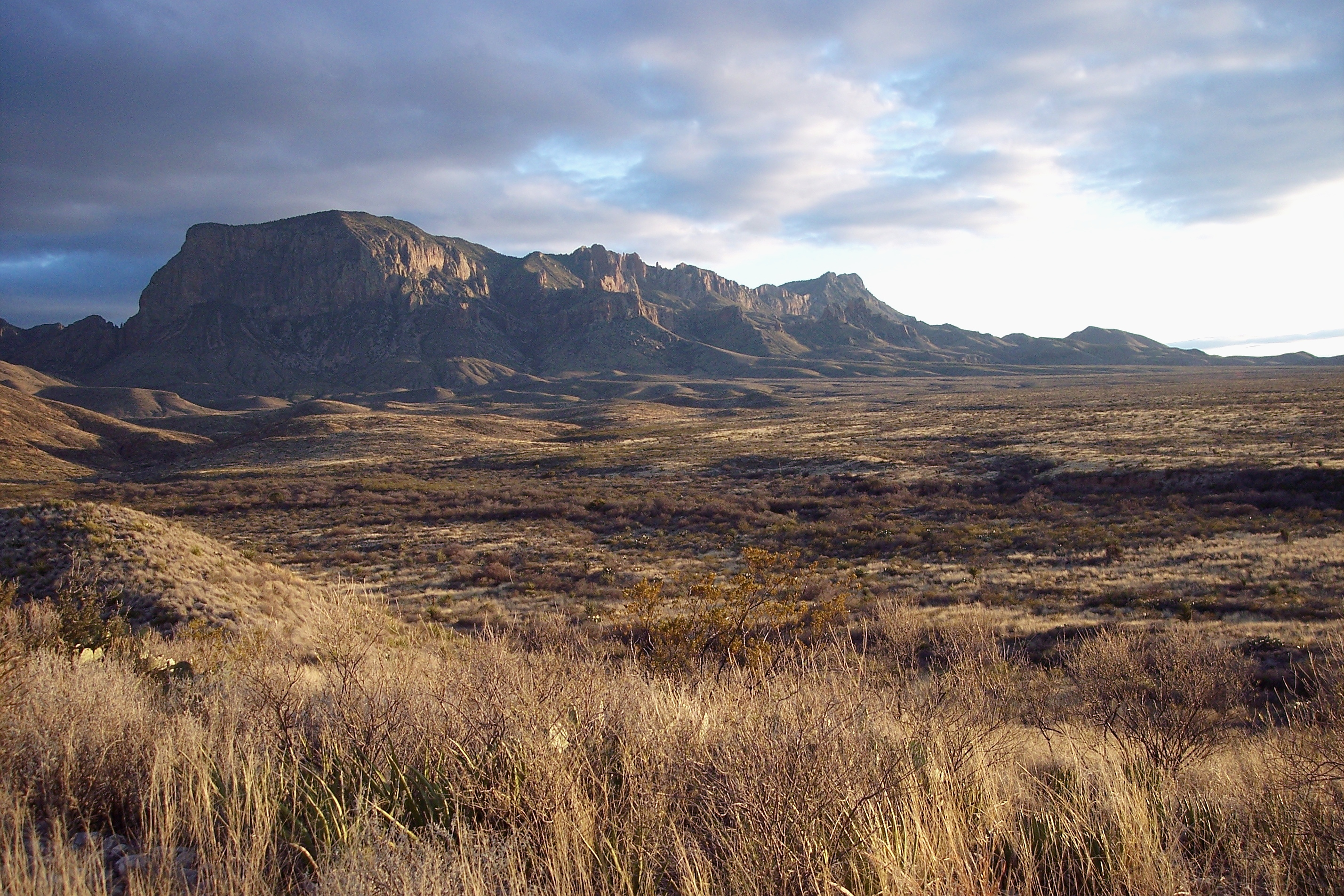
Big Bend and the Chihuahuan Desert

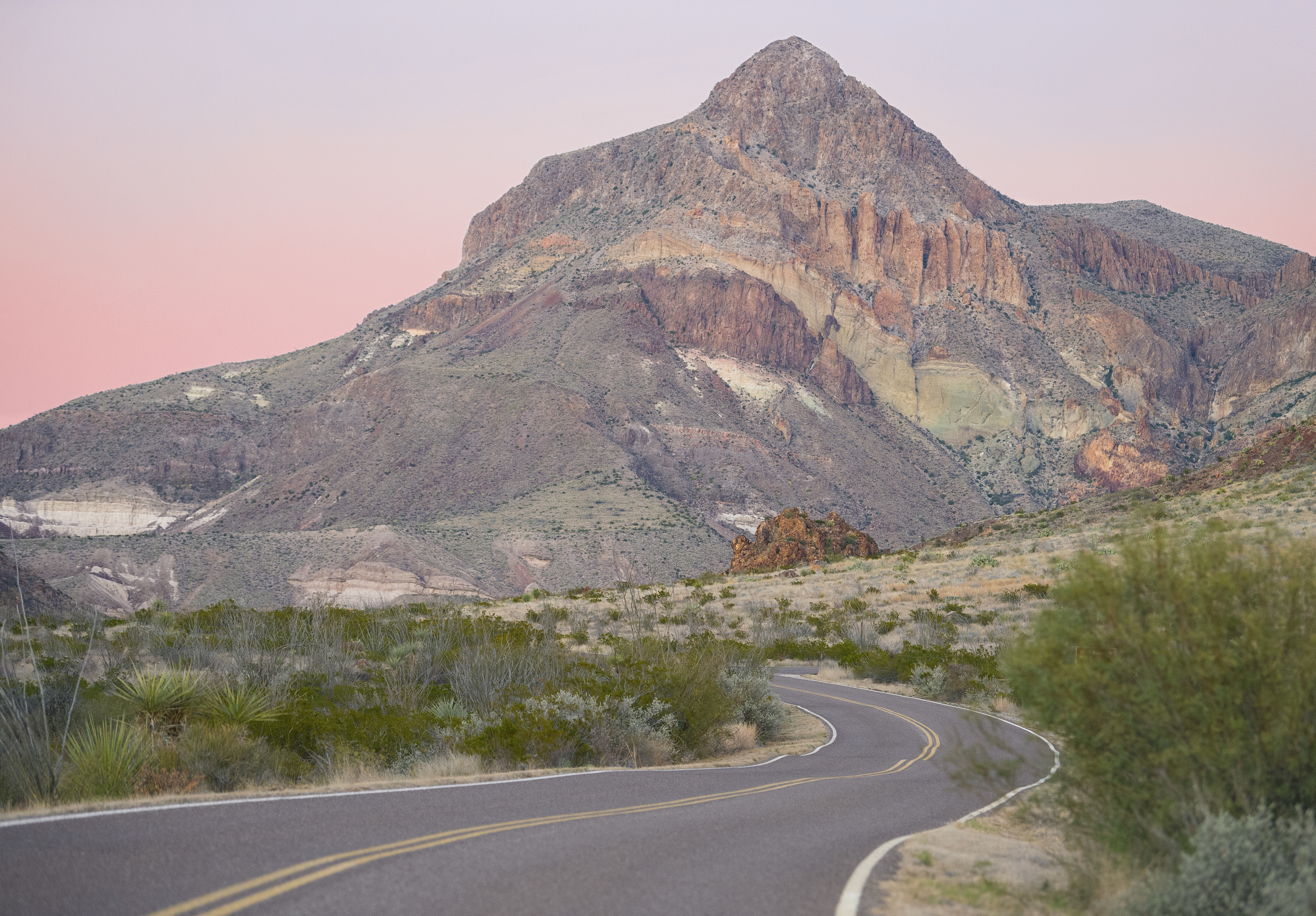
Ross Maxwell Scenic Drive

During the early historic period (before 1535), several Indian groups were recorded as inhabiting the Big Bend. The Chisos Indians were a loosely organized group of nomadic hunters and gatherers who probably practiced limited agriculture on a seasonal basis. The origin of the Chisos Indians is not known. Linguistically, they were associated with the Conchos Indians of northern Chihuahua and northwestern Coahuila. They spoke a member of Uto-Aztecan, a language family whose speakers ranged from central Mexico to the Great Basin of the U.S.

The Jumano was a nomadic group that traveled and traded throughout West Texas and southeastern New Mexico, but some historic records indicate they were enemies of the Chisos. Around the beginning of the 18th century, the Mescalero Apaches began invading the Big Bend region and displacing the Chisos Indians. One of the last Native American groups to use the Big Bend was the Comanches, who passed through the park along the Comanche Trail on their way to and from periodic raids into the Mexican interior. These raids continued until the mid-19th century. The last of the great military leaders of the native peoples of the region was an Apache of Spanish ancestry named Alzate, who was active as late as the late 1860s.

The European presence in the region begins c. 1535 AD with the first Spanish explorations into this portion of North America. The expedition of Álvar Núñez Cabeza de Vaca passed near the Big Bend and was followed by other expeditions. Some of these expeditions were searching for gold and silver, or farm and ranch land. Others, such as those by the Franciscan missionaries, were intended to establish centers in which the natives could be evangelized. In an attempt to protect the northern frontier of the New Spain, from which emerged present-day Mexico, a line of presidios, or forts, was established along the Rio Grande in the late 18th century. The Presidio de San Vicente was built near present-day San Vicente, Coahuila, and the Presidio de San Carlos was built near present-day Manuel Benavides, Chihuahua. Some of the presidios were soon abandoned because of financial difficulties and because they could not effectively stop Indian intrusions into Mexico. The soldiers and settlers of these presidios moved to newer presidios where the interests of the Spanish Empire were more defensible. Such was the case of Santa Rosa Maria del Sacramento, now Muzquiz, Coahuila.

Very little study has been made of the Spanish occupation of the Big Bend following the abandonment of the presidios. In 1805, a Spanish settlement called Altares existed 30 mi (48 km) south of the Rio Grande. The region became part of Mexico after achieving independence from Spain in 1821. Mexican families lived in the area when English-speaking settlers began arriving after Texas seceded in the latter half of the 19th century.

Following the end of the Mexican–American War in 1848, the U.S. Army made military surveys of the uncharted land of the Big Bend. Forts and outposts were established across Trans-Pecos Texas to protect migrating settlers from Indian attacks. A significant proportion of soldiers in the late 1800s were African American and came to be called the "buffalo soldiers", a name apparently given to them by Native Americans. Lieutenant Henry Flipper, the first American of African ancestry to graduate from West Point, served in Shafter, Texas, near the end of the 19th century. (Shafter, named for General William R. Shafter, lies west of the Big Bend along the highway from Presidio to Marfa.) Ranchers began to settle in the Big Bend about 1880, and by 1900, sheep, goat, and cattle ranches occupied most of the area. The delicate desert environment was soon overgrazed.

In the late 19th and early 20th centuries, valuable mineral deposits were discovered, which attracted settlers who worked in the mines or supported them by farming or cutting timber for the mines and smelters. Communities sprang up around the mines. Boquillas and Terlingua both resulted from mining operations. During this period, the Rio Grande flood plain was settled by farmers. Settlements developed with names like Terlingua Abajo, San Vicente, La Coyota, and Castolon. Often, no more than clusters of families lived and farmed in the same area, and they were successful only to the degree that the land supported them.

In May 1916, a raid on Glenn Springs received national attention, prompting President Wilson to order the mobilization of the Texas National Guard to aid federal forces along the border. A permanent cavalry camp was established at Glenn Springs in 1916 and remained until 1920, when the border situation improved.

=== Establishing a park ===
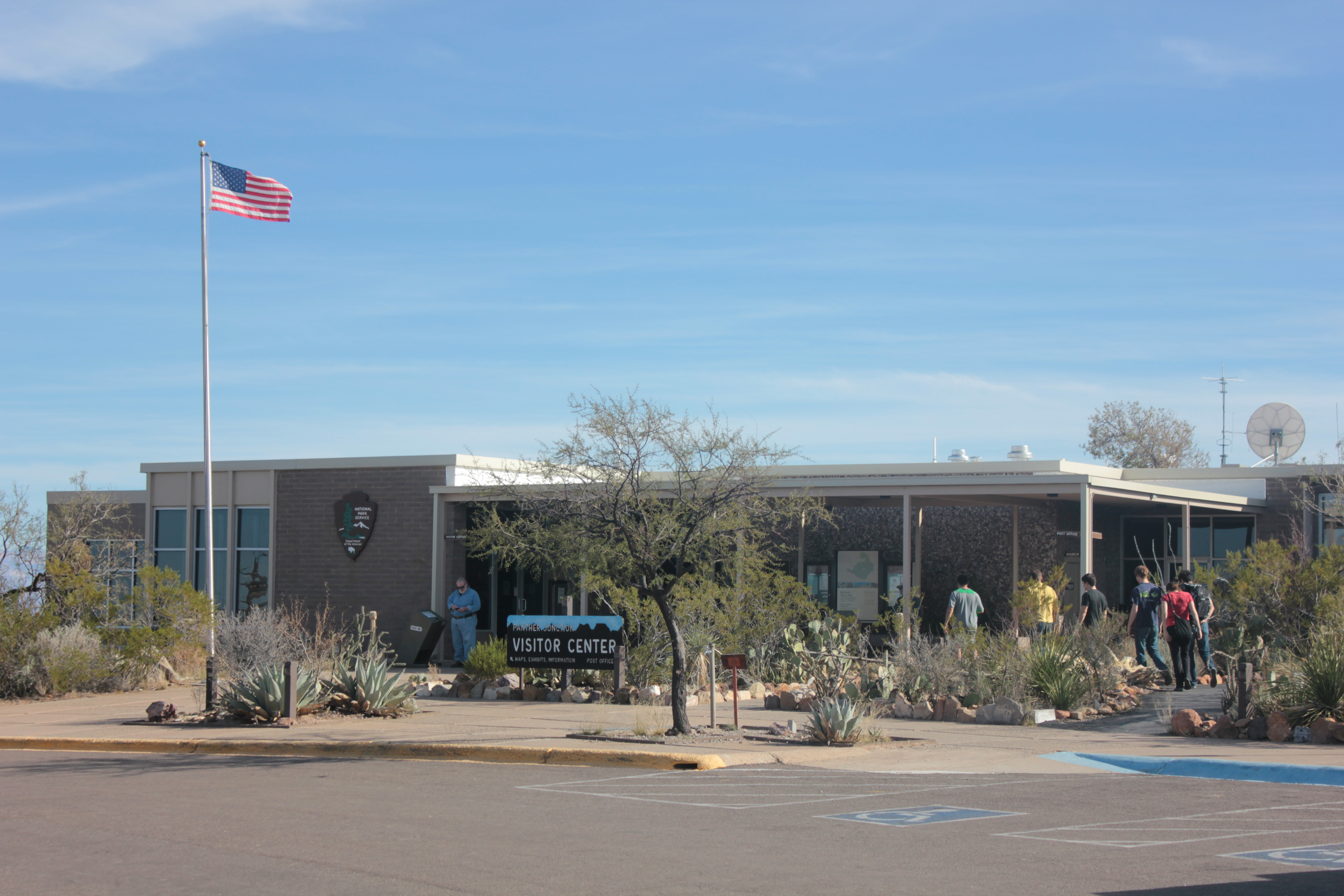
Main visitor center at Panther Junction

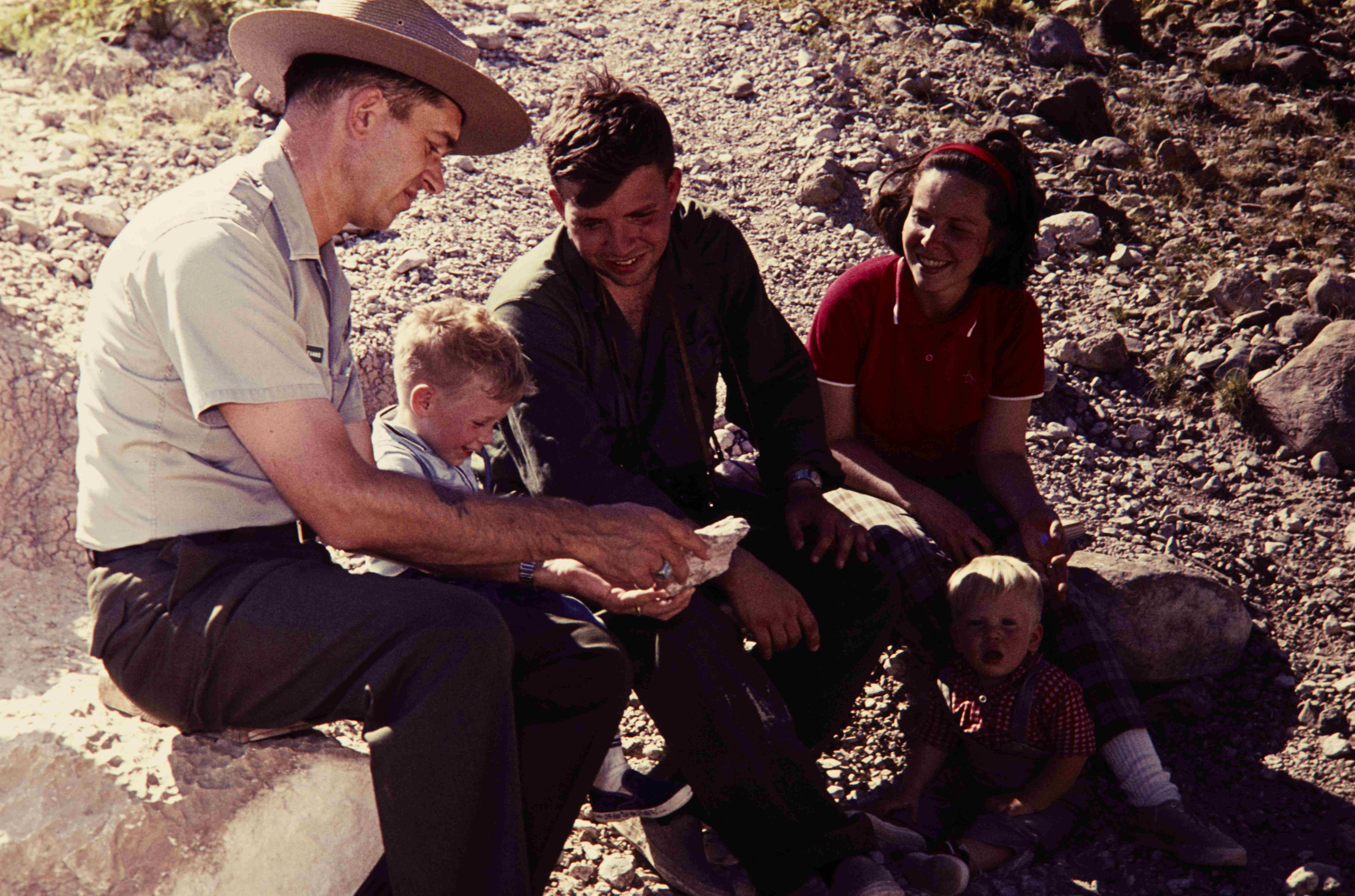
A National Park Service employee showing a rock to visitors at Big Bend National Park, 1960s

In the 1930s, many people who loved the Big Bend country recognized it as a land of unique contrasts and beauty, worth preserving for future generations. In 1933, the Texas Legislature passed legislation to establish Texas Canyons State Park. Later that year, the park was redesignated Big Bend State Park. In 1935, the United States Congress passed legislation enabling the acquisition of land for a national park. The State of Texas deeded the land that it had acquired to the federal government, and on June 12, 1944, Big Bend National Park became a reality. The park opened to visitors on July 1, 1944.

Big Bend remains one of the largest, most remote, and least-visited national parks in the contiguous United States. Over the 10 years from 2009 to 2019, an average of 377,154 visitors entered the park each year.

=== Conservation concerns ===
In July 2026, the second Trump administration waived restrictions on construction of a border wall and roads slated to run through parts of Big Bend National Park. Multiple conservation groups condemned the decision, stating that major harm to wildlife and nearby human residencies could occur, and U.S. Senator John Cornyn wrote a letter to authorities calling for discussions regarding the matter before construction can be authorized. In October 2026, the Trump administration asked the Supreme Court to let border wall construction and related projects resume in Texas's Big Bend region after a federal judge temporarily halted the work.

== Geology ==
Big Bend from space, 2002

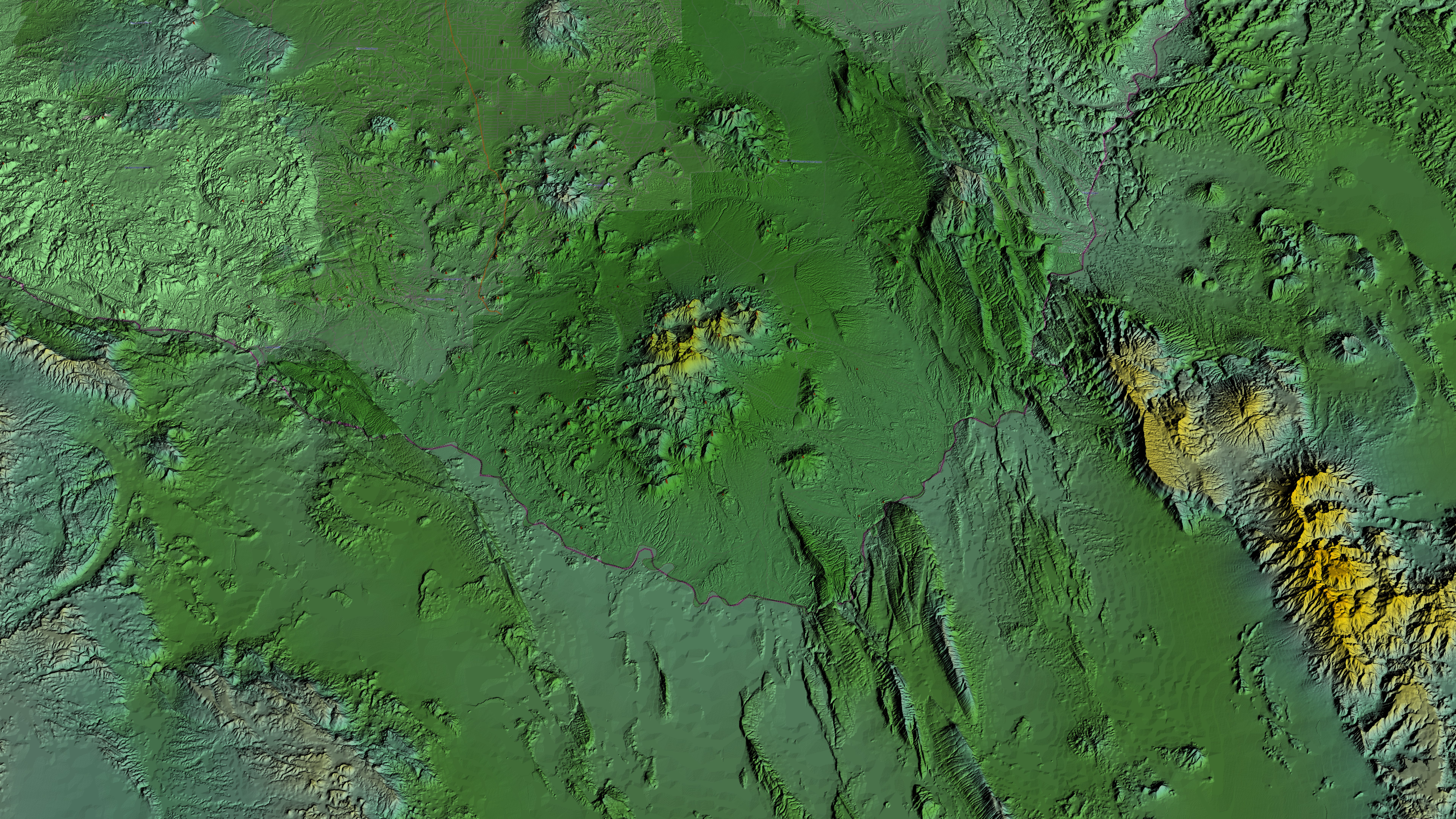
Aerial view, 3D computer generated image

The oldest recorded tectonic activity in the park is related to the Paleozoic Marathon orogeny, although Proterozoic events (over 550 Mya) possibly have some deep control. The Marathon orogeny (part of the Ouachita-Marathon-Sonora orogenic belt) is part of thrusting of rocks from the South American Plate over the North American Plate. This can be best seen in the Persimmon Gap area of the park. This orogenic event is linked to the lack of Triassic- and Jurassic-age rocks in the park.

Between the Triassic and the Cretaceous, the South American Plate rifted from the North American Plate, resulting in the deposition of the Glen Rose Limestone, Del Carmen Limestone, Sue Peaks Formation, Santa Elena Limestone, Del Rio Clay, Buda Limestone, and Boquillas formations (preserved in the Sierra del Carmen–Santiago Mountains, Nine Point Mesa, Mariscal Mountain, and Mesa de Anguila areas). Also during this time, the Chihuahua trough formed as the Gulf of Mexico opened, which resulted in east–west striking normal faulting. As a result of this depositional time, dinosaur, forest and other fossils are preserved in the park.

Following the ending of rifting in the Late Cretaceous to the early Cenozoic, the Big Bend area was subjected to the Laramide orogeny. This period of (now east–west) compression caused the northeast-facing Mesa de Anguila (an uplifted monocline on the park's southwest margin), the southwest-facing Sierra del Carmen–Santiago Mountains (an uplifted and thrust-faulted monocline that forms the park's boundary on the east) and the Tornillo Basin. During the middle Cenozoic, most of the volcanic rocks, including the Chisos Group, the Pine Canyon caldera complex, and the Burro Mesa Formation, formed.

The most recent tectonic activity in the park is basin and range faulting from the Neogene to Quaternary. This period of east–west extension has resulted in the Estufa and Dehalo bolsons in the Chisos Mountains, as well as the Terlingua and Sierra del Carmen Faults, the Chalk Draw Fault, and the Burro Mesa Fault. The Rio Grande entered the Big Bend area roughly 2 million years ago, and since then, extensive erosion and downcutting have occurred.

== Cultural resources ==
Cultural resources in the park range from the Paleo-Indian period 10,500 years ago through the historic period represented by Native American groups, such as the Chisos, Mescaleros, and Comanche. More recently, Spanish, Mexican, Anglo, and Irish settlers farmed, ranched, and mined in the area.

Throughout the prehistoric period, humans found shelter and maintained open campsites throughout the park. The archeological record reveals an Archaic-period desert culture, whose inhabitants developed a nomadic, hunting-and-gathering lifestyle that remained virtually unchanged for several thousand years.

The historic cultural landscape centers upon various subsistence or commercial land use. The riparian and tributary environments were used for subsistence and irrigation farming. Transportation networks, irrigation structures, simple domestic residences and outbuildings, and planned and terraced farmland lining the stream banks characterize these landscapes.

== Flora and fauna ==
Despite its harsh desert environment, Big Bend has more than 1,200 species of plants (including 60 cactus species), over 600 species of vertebrates, and about 3,600 insect species. The variety of life is largely due to the diverse ecology and changes in elevation between the dry, hot desert, the cool mountains, and the fertile river valley.

=== Plants ===
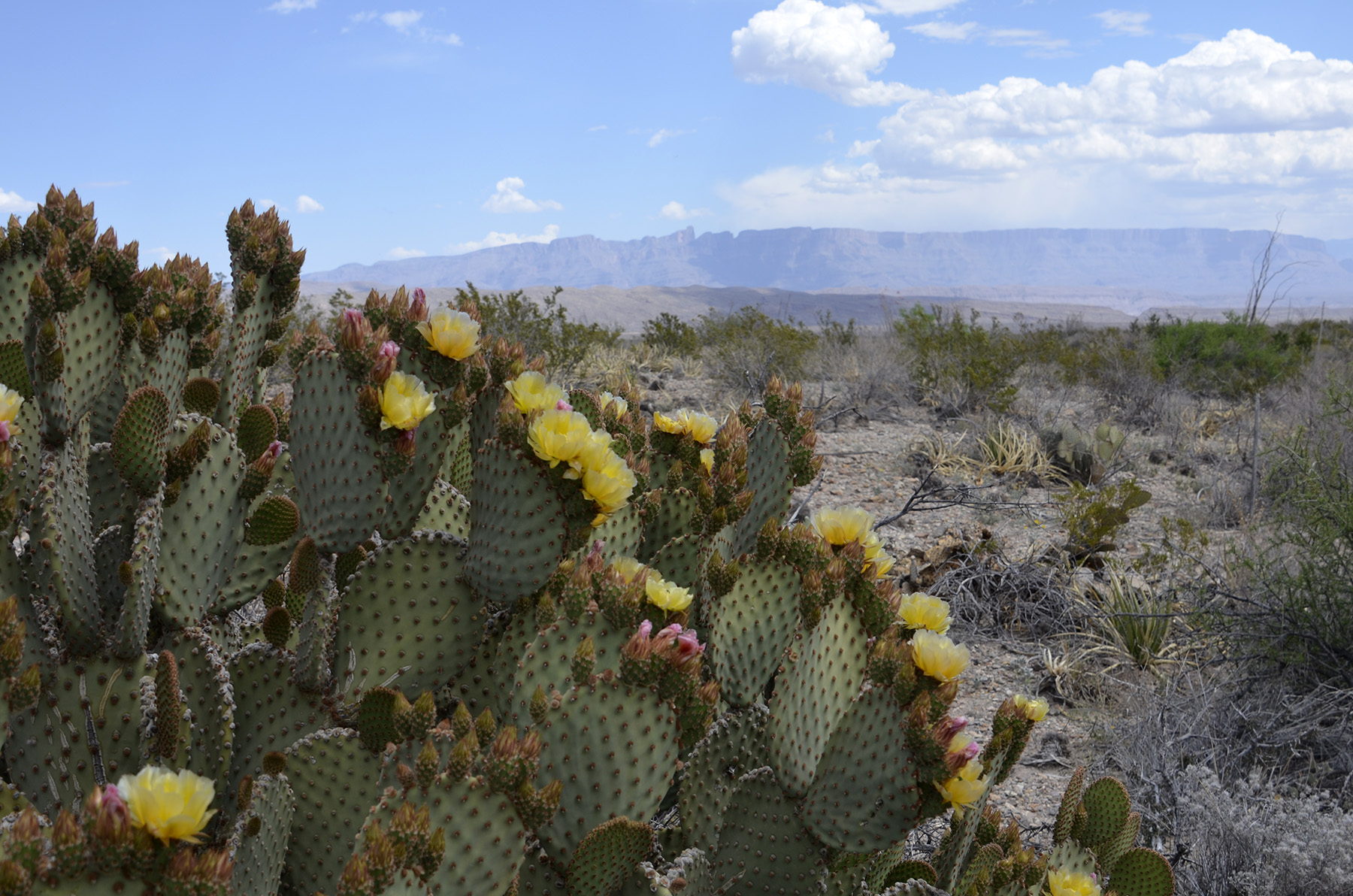
Blind prickly pear

The variety of cactus and other plant life adds color to the Big Bend region. Cactus in the park include prickly pear (Opuntia spp.), claretcup (Echinocereus coccineus), and pitaya (E. enneacanthus). In the spring, the wildflowers are in full bloom, and the yucca flowers display bright colors. Bluebonnets (Lupinus spp.) are prevalent in Big Bend, and white and pink bluebonnets are sometimes visible by the road. Other flowering plants such as the desert marigold (Baileya multiradiata), desert willow (Chilopsis linearis), ocotillo (Fouquieria splendens), rock nettle (Eucnide urens), and lechuguilla (Agave lechuguilla) abound in Big Bend.

Of particular importance to the region was the candelilla plant (Euphorbia antisyphilitica). This was used to produce candelilla wax and was the motivation for wax camps in the Big Bend area, such as Glenn Springs, Texas.

=== Animals ===
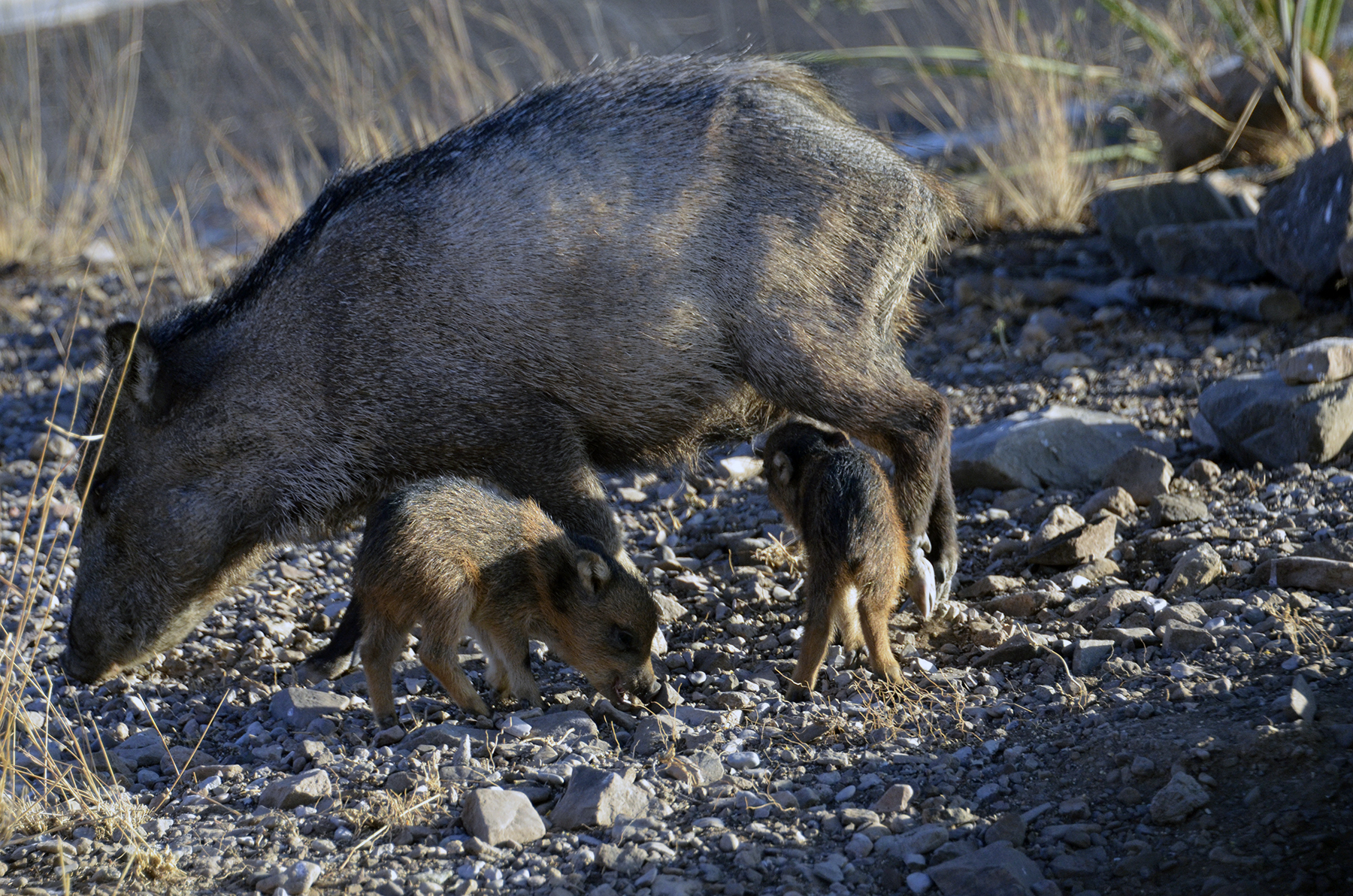
Javelina and young

Most animals are not visible during the day, particularly in the desert. The park comes alive at night, as many animals forage for food. About 150 cougar (Puma concolor) sightings are reported per year, even though only two dozen cougars live in the park. Other species that inhabit the park include coyote (Canis latrans), kangaroo rat (Dipodomys spp.), greater roadrunner (Geococcyx californianus), golden eagle (Aquila chrysaetos), gray fox (Urocyon cinereoargenteus), collared peccary (Dicotyles tajacu), and black-tailed jackrabbit (Lepus californicus). Mexican black bears (Ursus americanus eremicus) are also present in the mountain areas.

Plans to reintroduce the Mexican wolf (Canis lupus baileyi) to Big Bend National Park were rejected in the late 1980s by the state of Texas. Disagreement over the reintroduction centered on whether the park had enough prey, such as deer and javelinas, to sustain a wolf population.

==== Birds ====
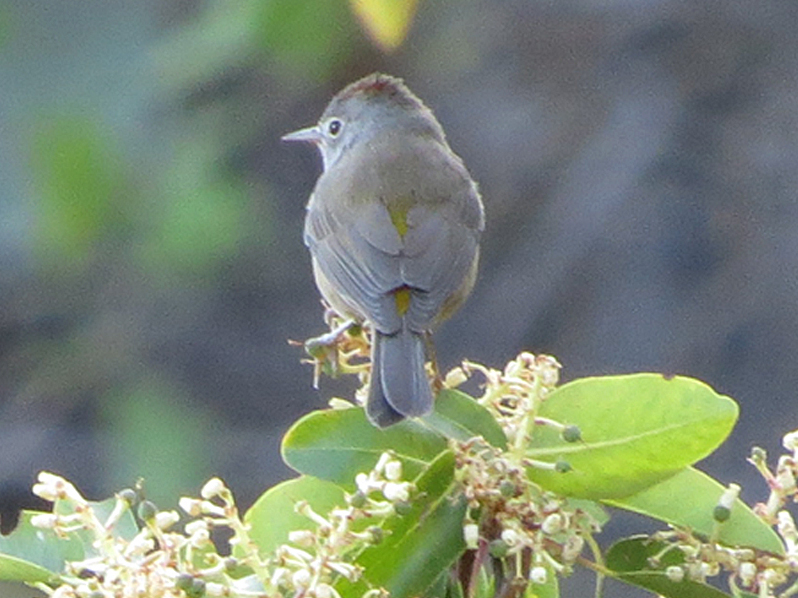
Colima warbler

More than 450 species of birds have been recorded at Big Bend NP.

Eight basic land cover types occur in the park. In order of predominance, they are desert shrubland, igneous grassland, limestone grassland, riparian vegetation, montane woodland, bare ground, developed areas, and surface water.

Birders flock to the park, as it is home to the only area in the United States within the breeding range of the Colima warbler (Leiothlypis crissalis). The colima warbler arrives in the Chisos Mountains in mid-April and stays through summer in the high canyons of the mountains. By mid-September, it returns to its wintering grounds in southwestern Mexico. The species is a ground nester and prefers the oak-maple habitat found in Boot Canyon and similar high, cool areas from Laguna Meadow to Boot Canyon and the South Rim. The first U.S. record of the northern tufted flycatcher (Mitrephanes phaeocercus), a Central American species, was from this site in November 1991.

== Fossils ==
=== History of paleontology at Big Bend ===
Paleontologists began working at Big Bend National Park site as early as 1907, with the discovery of sharks and ammonite fossils by Johan Udden. Then, from 1938 to 1939, a handful of men worked at three fossil quarries in Big Bend as part of a Works Progress Administration project. Other fossil hunters, including Barnum Brown and Roland "R.T." Bird, arrived in 1940 to search for dinosaur remains. Among other discoveries, Brown and Bird uncovered neck vertebrae of a giant sauropod, Alamosaurus, as well as partial jawbones of a crocodylian species, Deinosuchus.

The first museum built to display fossils at the park burned down in 1941; mammoth teeth and saber-tooth cat fossils were lost in the blaze. A new exhibit of fossil bones opened in 1957, and displayed fossils of Hyracotherium, an early relative to horses, and Coryphodon, a large hippo-like animal that lived during the Paleocene and Eocene, about 55 million years ago (mya). In 1990, the fossils were replaced with replicas, but the museum was overhauled in the 2000s – a redesigned Fossil Discovery Exhibit opened in 2017. Today, citizens need permits to collect fossils in Big Bend National Park legally.

=== Fossils by ecosystem and time period ===
==== Big Bend Underwater ====
135 million years ago, Big Bend was underwater. Fossils from this time period include sharks, marine reptiles such as plesiosaurs, pliosaurs, plankton and foraminifera microfossils – as well as the remains of larger mollusks. Fossils from 85 to 82 mya show that warm waters frequented by sharks covered Big Bend, small mosasaurs, and fish such as Xiphactinus. Spiral-shelled ammonites and invertebrates of the marine shelf are also common.

==== Big Bend Delta ====
When water levels fell 83-72 mya, the area that is now Big Bend became a complex mosaic of deltas, populated by fish and sharks, big turtles, and crocodylian. There is also evidence of terrestrial species such as herds of hadrosaurs, horned ceratopsids, armored nodosaurs, and tyrannosauroids.

==== The Javelina Formation (72–67 mya) ====
Big Bend was, at this time, well above sea level. Some of its animals include early carnivorous mammals, hadrosaurs, ceratopsians, tyrannosauroids, and one of the largest known pterosaurs, Quetzalcoatlus. Its waterways were filled with fish, rays, and amphibians.

==== Black Peaks Formation (67–66 mya) ====
In geological strata marking the end of the Cretaceous, the remains of flowering plants, conifers, gar, rays, as well as the bones of Alamosaurus have been found. The Cretaceous–Paleogene (K–Pg) extinction event occurred around 66 mya, wiping out seventy percent of life on land, including all non-bird dinosaurs and pterosaurs, and 90 percent of ocean life.

== Hot Springs ==
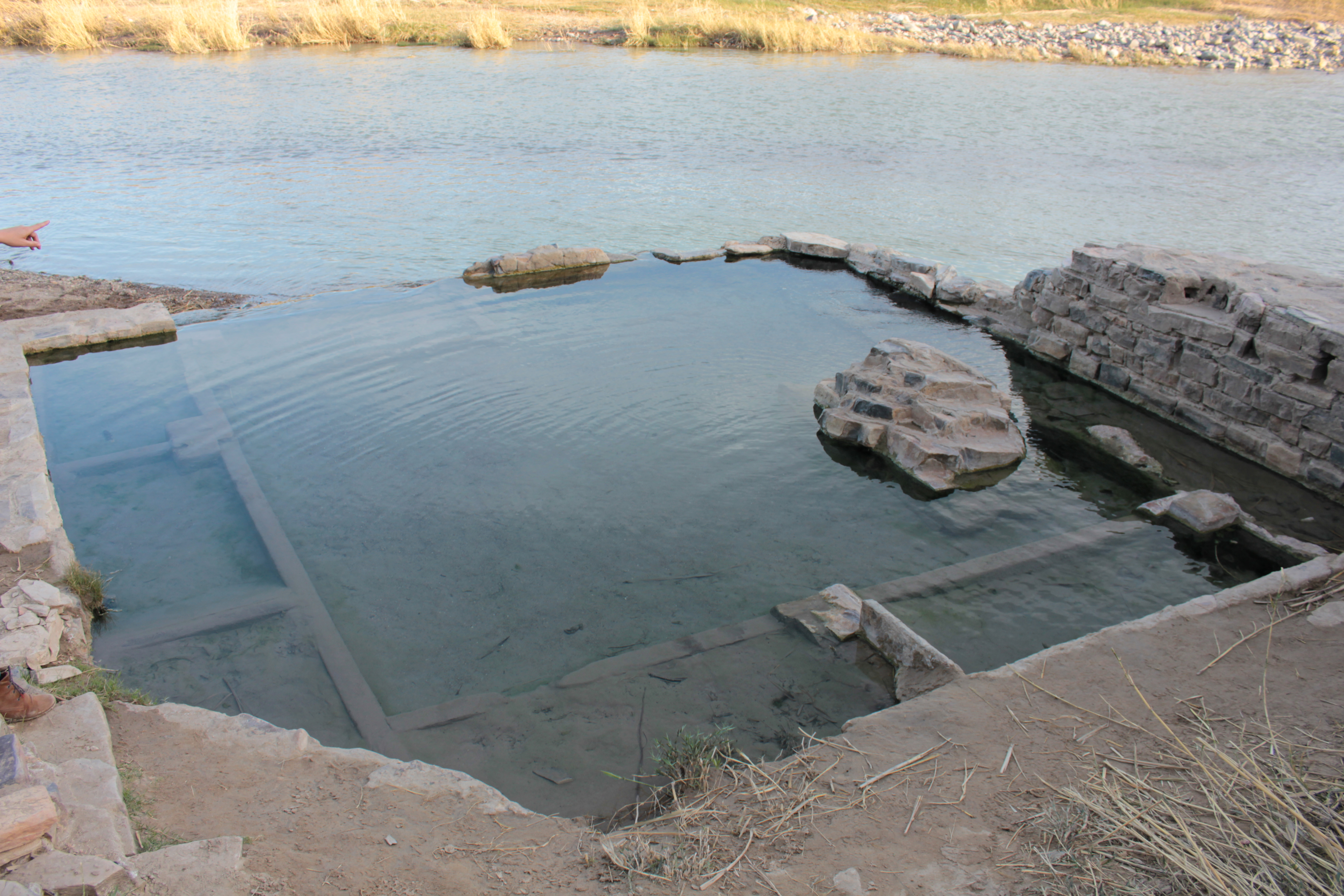
Hot Springs at the site of the foundation of the old bathhouse

The park has several hot springs, including the springs in the Hot Springs Historic District. The main hot spring is called Hot Springs; it is also known as Bocadillas Hot Springs and Langford Hot Springs. Hot Springs is on the National Register of Historic Places. The hot springs were the first major tourist attraction in the Big Bend area before the national park was established. In 1909, J.O. Langford began developing the springs. A small stone soaking tub, made of local stone from before Langford's development, was excavated at the site. A dugout shelter existed at the site that the Langford family renovated as a residence. The Langfords then constructed an adobe house, a stone bathhouse, and bathing shelters made of brushwood. Later in 1927, they rebuilt the bathhouse and built a store and a motor court with seven attached cabins.

== Tourism ==
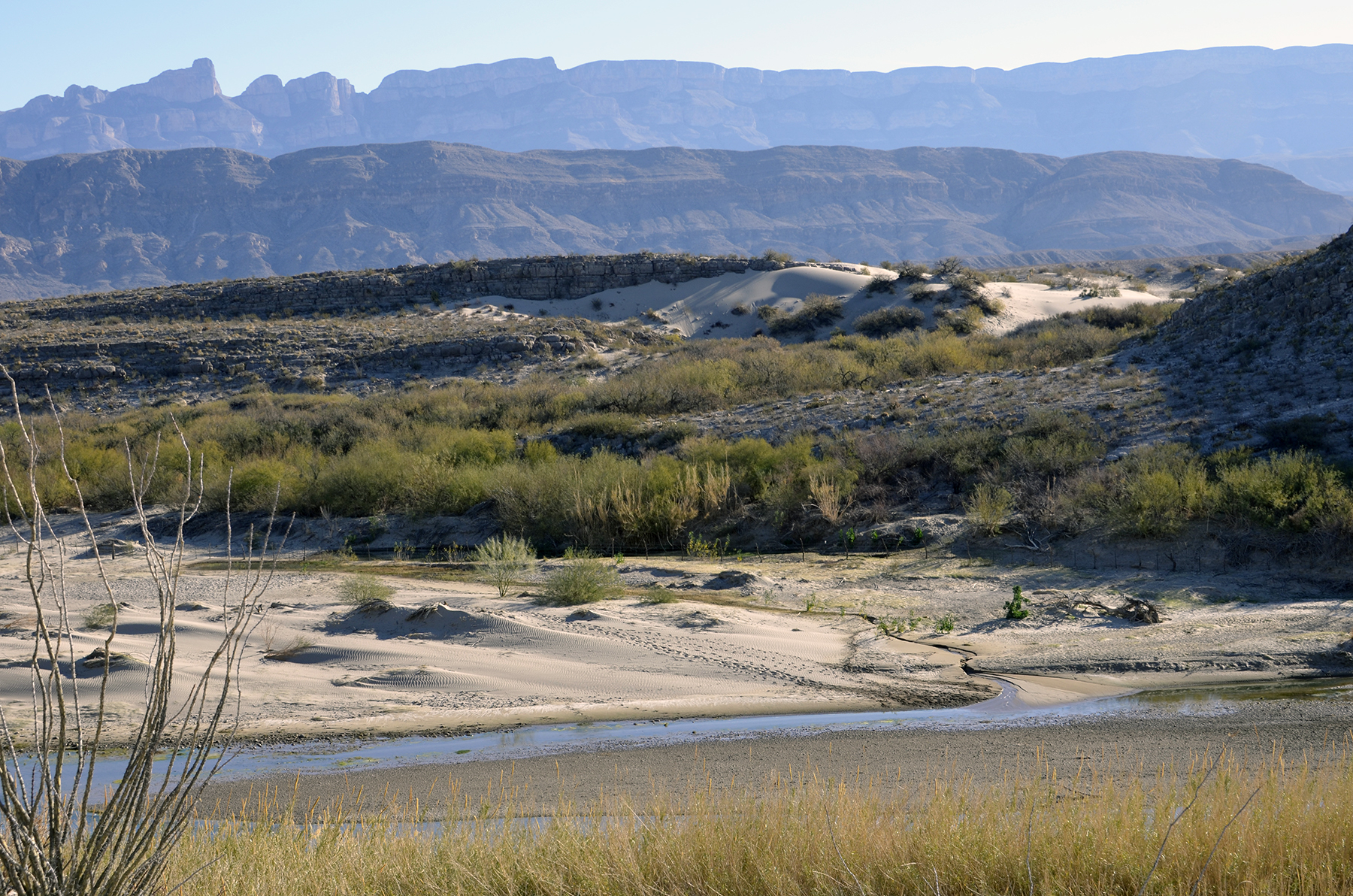
Dunes from the Rio Grande Village Nature Trail

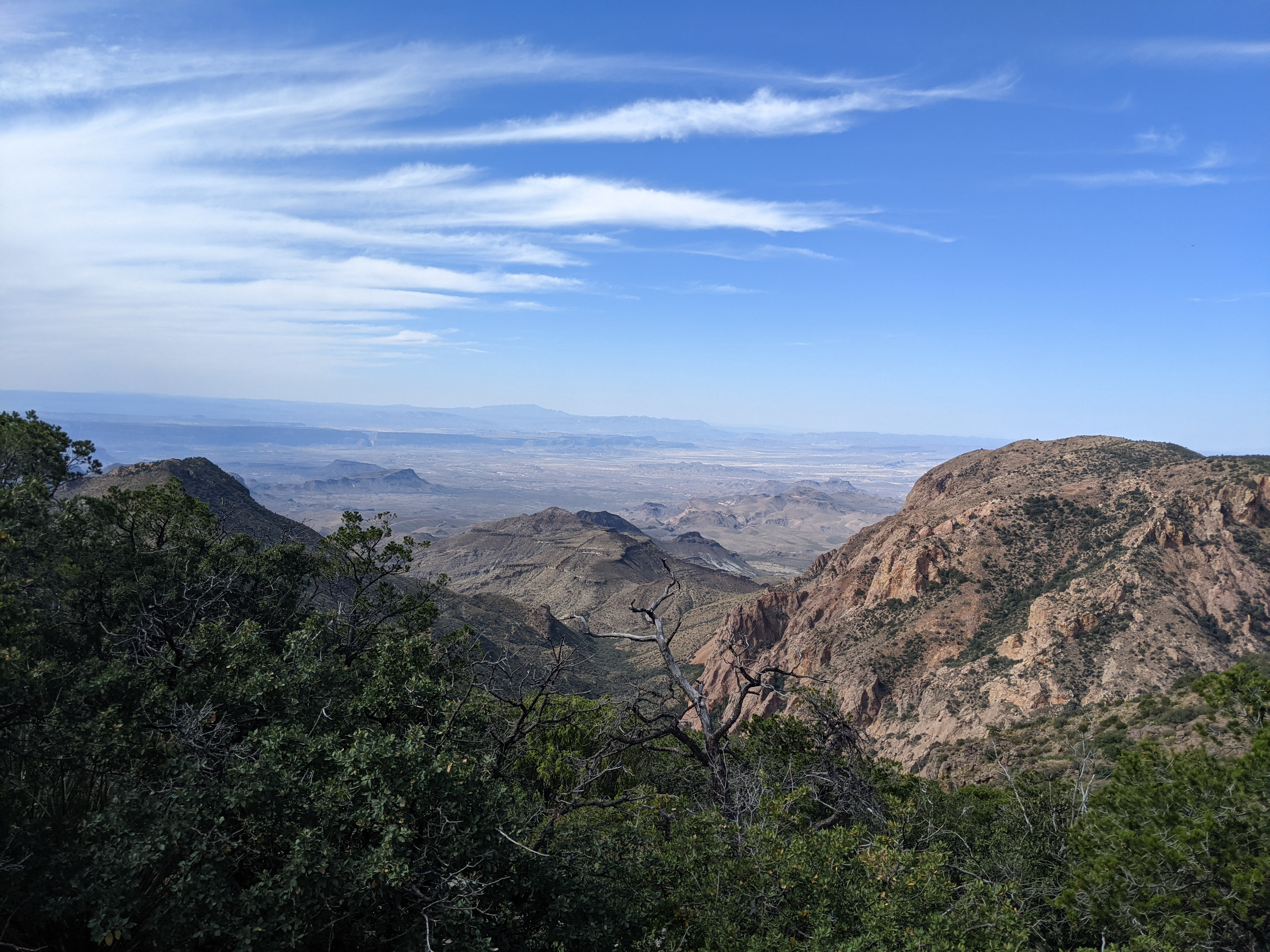
Big Bend South Rim from the South West Rim trail

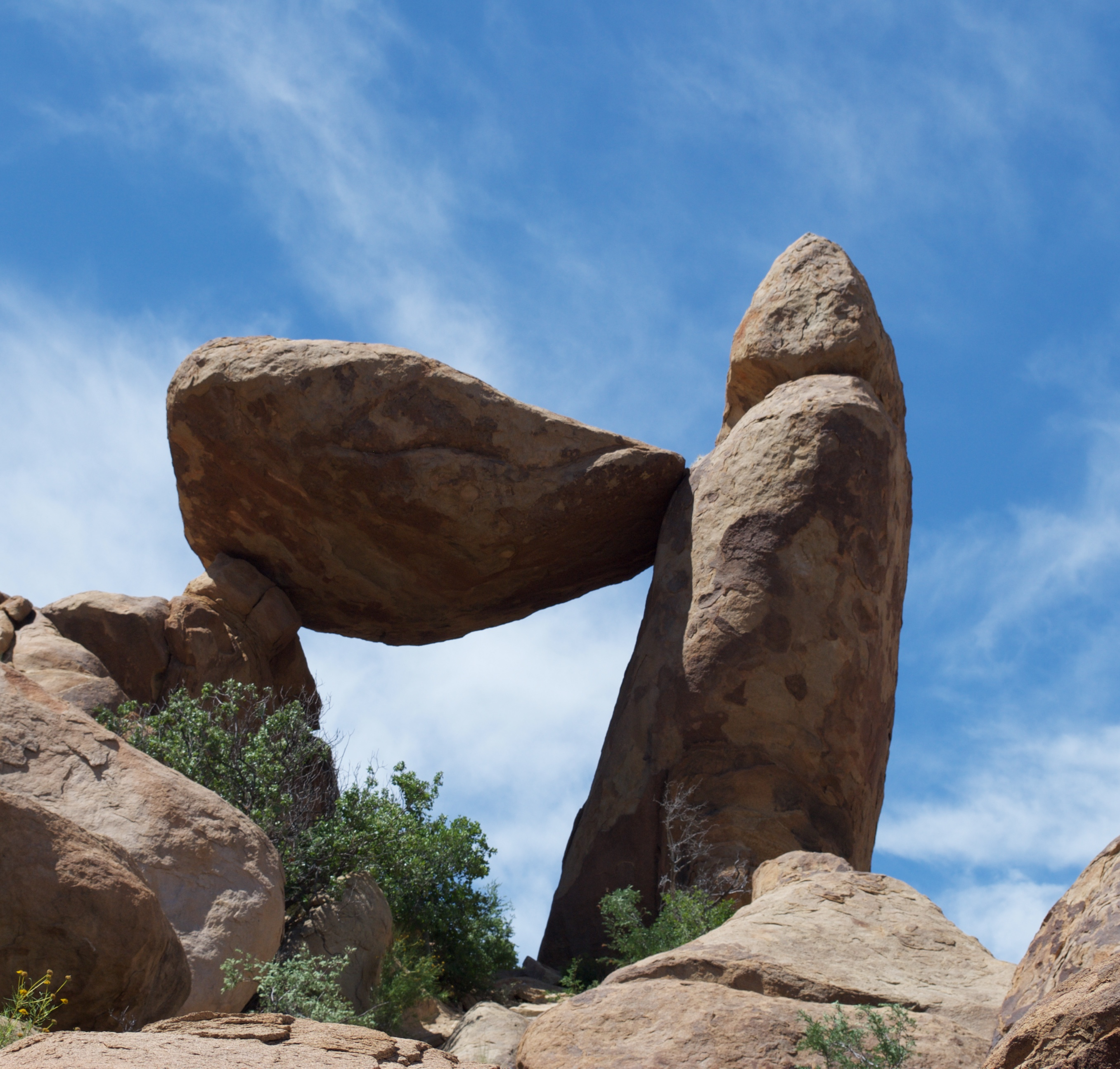
Balanced Rock in the Grapevine Hills

Big Bend's primary attraction is its hiking and backpacking trails. Particularly notable among these are the Chimneys Trail, which visits a rock formation in the desert; the Marufo Vega trail, a loop trail that passes through scenic canyons on the way to and from the Rio Grande; the South Rim trail which circles the high mountains of the Chisos; and the Outer Mountain Loop trail in the Chisos, which incorporates parts of the South Rim loop, descends into the desert along the Dodson Trail, and then returns to the Chisos Basin, completing a 30-mile loop. Other notable locations include Santa Elena Canyon, Grapevine Hills, and the Mule Ears, two imposing rock towers in the middle of the desert. Professional backpacking guide services provide trips in the park.

The park administers 118 miles (190 km) of the Rio Grande for recreational use. Professional river outfitters provide tours of the river. Use of a personal boat is permitted, but a free river float permit is required. In June 2009, the Department of Homeland Security began treating all float trips as international departures. It required participants to present acceptable identification, such as a passport, to re-enter the country.

Visitors often cross the Rio Grande to visit the Mexican village of Boquillas. The Department of Homeland Security closed the border crossing in 2002 due to increased security following the September 11 attacks. Still, in April 2013, the Boquillas crossing reopened as an official Class B Port of Entry between the U.S. and Mexico. It is open Wednesday through Sunday, 9 am to 6 pm.

With more than 450 bird species recorded in the park, birdwatching is a widely popular activity. Many species stop in the park during their annual migrations.

Five paved roads are in Big Bend. Persimmon Gap to Panther Junction is a 28-mile (45 km) road from the north entrance of the park to park headquarters at Panther Junction. Panther Junction to Rio Grande Village is a 21-mile (34 km) road that descends 2,000 feet (610 m) from the park headquarters to the Rio Grande. Maverick Entrance Station to Panther Junction is a 23-mile (37 km) route from the western entrance of the park to the park headquarters. Chisos Basin Road is 6 miles (10 km) long and climbs to 5,679 feet (1,731 m) above sea level at Panther Pass before descending into the Chisos Basin. The 30-mile (48 km) Ross Maxwell Scenic Drive leads to the Castolon Historic District and Santa Elena Canyon.

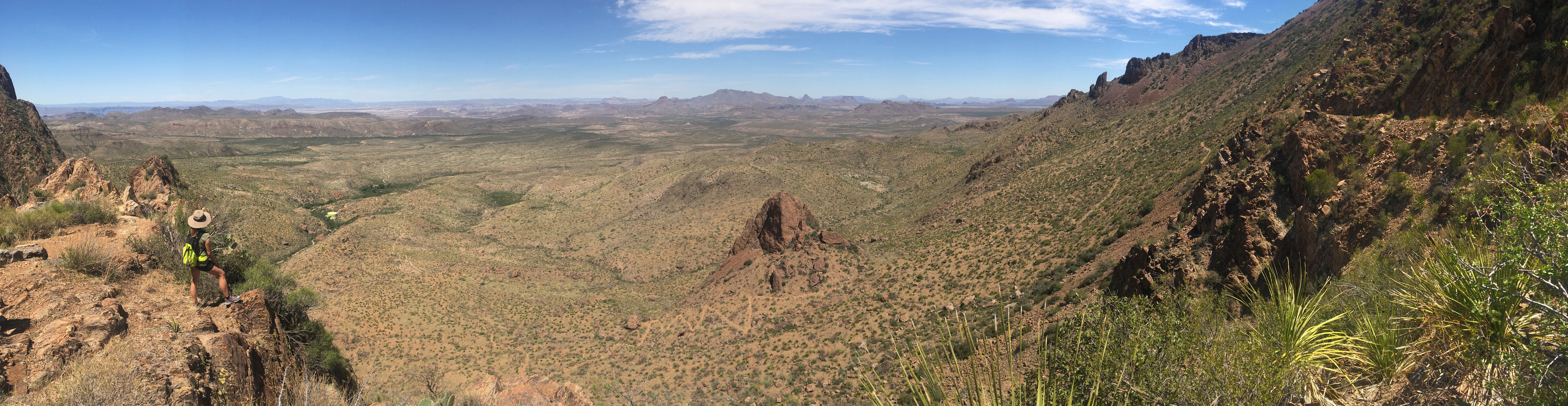
View from above the Window looking at the desert far below

=== International dark-sky park ===
In 2012, the park was designated an international dark-sky park by the International Dark-Sky Association. The association also recognized the park with its Gold Tier designation as "free from all but the most minor impacts of light pollution". Measurements made by the National Park Service show that Big Bend has the darkest skies in the contiguous United States. Thousands of stars, bright planets, and the Milky Way are visible on clear nights.

== Education ==
San Vicente Independent School District is based on the park grounds. San Vicente ISD's facility moved to the Panther Junction area circa 1951 so children of park employees had a local school. Much of the park is in San Vicente ISD while other parts are physically in Terlingua Common School District. High school-aged students from San Vicente ISD attend high school at Big Bend High School of Terlingua CSD.

Before 1996 Alpine High School of the Alpine Independent School District served as the high school for students from Terlingua CSD, and also for students of San Vicente ISD. Big Bend High opened in 1996. San Vicente began sending students to Big Bend High when it was established in 1996.

== See also ==
- List of national parks of the United States
- Big Bend
- Guadalupe Mountains
- Marathon, Texas
- Mexico–United States international park
- McKittrick Canyon
- Pecos River
- Rio Grande Wild and Scenic River

== Bibliography ==
- Gómez, Arthur R. (1990) A Most Singular Country: A History of Occupation in the Big Bend. Charles Redd Center for Western Studies; Brigham Young University.
- Jameson, John R. (1996) The Story of Big Bend National Park. University of Texas Press.
- Maxwell, Ross A. (1968) The Big Bend of the Rio Grande: A Guide to the Rocks, Landscape, Geologic History, and Settlers of the Area of Big Bend National Park. Bureau of Economic Geology; University of Texas.
