= Lajitas, Texas =

Unincorporated community in Brewster County, Texas, United States

- Unincorporated community
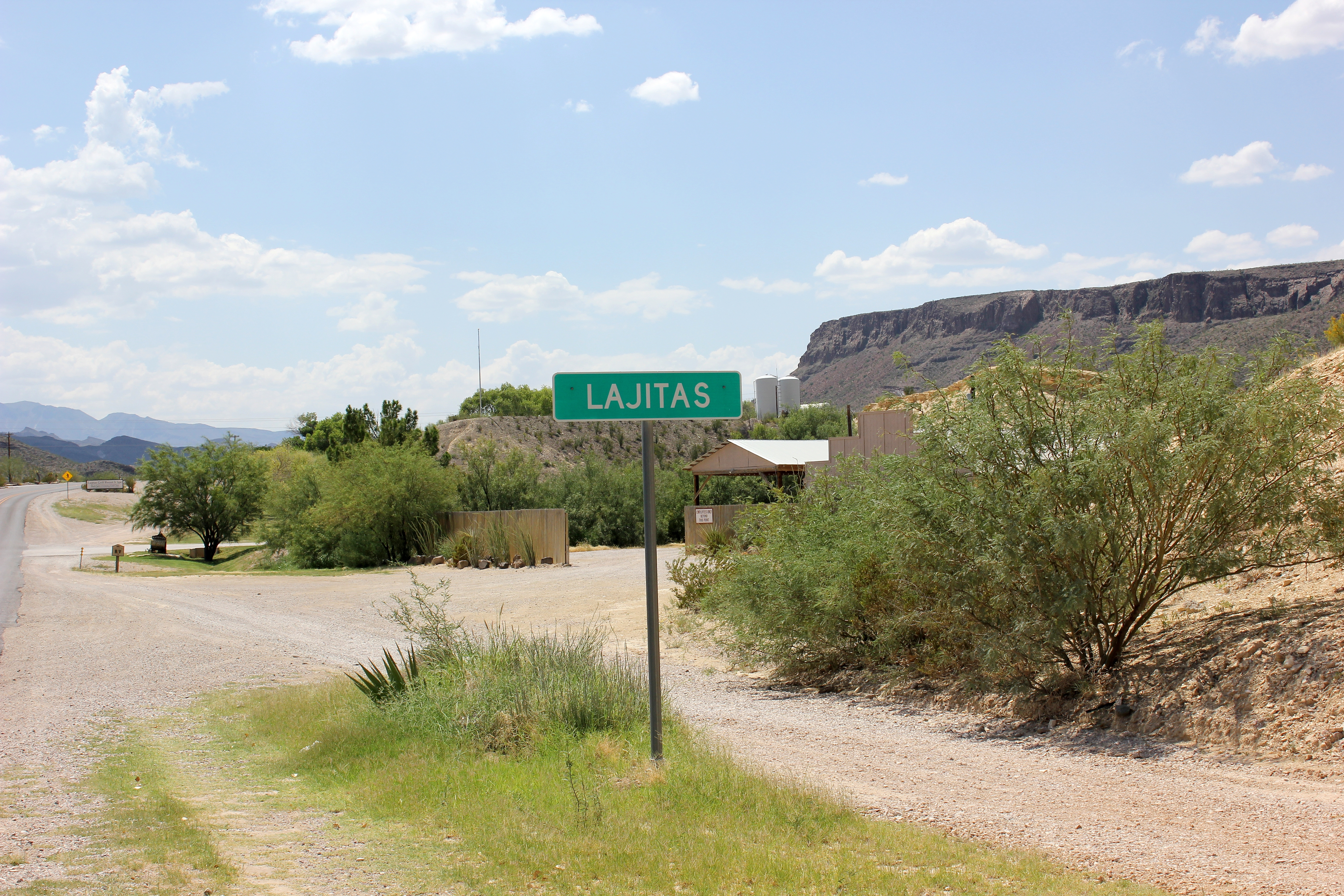
- Lajitas, July 2014

- Location within Texas
- Coordinates: 29°15′42″N 103°46′36″W
- Country: United States
- State: Texas
- County: Brewster
- Elevation: 2,343 ft (714 m)
- Time zone: UTC-6 (Central (CST))
  - Summer (DST): UTC-5 (CDT)
- ZIP codes: 79852
- Area code: 432
- GNIS feature ID: 1339481

Lajitas is an unincorporated community in Brewster County, Texas, United States, near the Big Bend National Park. According to the Handbook of Texas, the community had a population of 75 in 2010.

== History ==
The settlement is named after the Boquillas flagstone found in the area. Lajitas translates to "little flat rocks" in Spanish.

Starting in the 1980s as a joke, for many years the purported mayor of Lajitas was Clay Henry III, a "beer-drinking" goat. After two replacements of the original Clay Henry, the trading post and stable where the actual mayor lived is now closed and the goat no longer resides there. The election included incumbent human mayor Tommy Steele, as well as a trading post wooden Indian, and a dog named Buster. Since Clay Henry, goats have been mayors of the community ever since.

== Geography ==
Lajitas is located on the eastern end of the Big Bend Ranch State Park. It is located on a bluff overlooking the Rio Grande at San Carlos ford of the old Comanche Trail, in the northern part of the Chihuahuan Desert in southwestern Brewster County. It is also located 95 mi (153 km) south of Alpine and 50 mi (80 km) east of Presidio.

Columnar basalt that is similar to that of the Devils Postpile National Monument in California can be found in a high desert dry river falls area just north of Lajitas.

=== Climate ===
Lajitas has a hot arid climate with very hot summers and mild winters.

Climate data for Lajitas, Texas, 1991–2020 normals, extremes 1978–present
Month	Jan	Feb	Mar	Apr	May	Jun	Jul	Aug	Sep	Oct	Nov	Dec	Year
Record high °F (°C)	89 (32)	98 (37)	104 (40)	109 (43)	115 (46)	115 (46)	113 (45)	113 (45)	111 (44)	104 (40)	97 (36)	92 (33)	115 (46)
Mean maximum °F (°C)	83.5 (28.6)	89.9 (32.2)	95.5 (35.3)	101.5 (38.6)	107.8 (42.1)	110.8 (43.8)	108.5 (42.5)	106.3 (41.3)	104.0 (40.0)	99.7 (37.6)	90.1 (32.3)	83.0 (28.3)	111.4 (44.1)
Mean daily maximum °F (°C)	67.9 (19.9)	74.0 (23.3)	82.0 (27.8)	90.3 (32.4)	97.5 (36.4)	102.4 (39.1)	100.6 (38.1)	99.6 (37.6)	94.7 (34.8)	88.1 (31.2)	76.4 (24.7)	68.1 (20.1)	86.8 (30.5)
Daily mean °F (°C)	50.5 (10.3)	55.9 (13.3)	63.7 (17.6)	72.1 (22.3)	80.9 (27.2)	87.9 (31.1)	87.4 (30.8)	86.4 (30.2)	81.1 (27.3)	72.0 (22.2)	59.5 (15.3)	50.7 (10.4)	70.7 (21.5)
Mean daily minimum °F (°C)	33.0 (0.6)	37.9 (3.3)	45.4 (7.4)	53.9 (12.2)	64.3 (17.9)	73.4 (23.0)	74.3 (23.5)	73.2 (22.9)	67.5 (19.7)	55.9 (13.3)	42.7 (5.9)	33.3 (0.7)	54.6 (12.5)
Mean minimum °F (°C)	23.1 (−4.9)	26.2 (−3.2)	32.5 (0.3)	41.1 (5.1)	51.4 (10.8)	64.7 (18.2)	68.4 (20.2)	66.8 (19.3)	56.9 (13.8)	41.2 (5.1)	30.1 (−1.1)	21.6 (−5.8)	19.3 (−7.1)
Record low °F (°C)	12 (−11)	5 (−15)	19 (−7)	29 (−2)	35 (2)	59 (15)	61 (16)	53 (12)	47 (8)	27 (−3)	21 (−6)	4 (−16)	4 (−16)
Average precipitation inches (mm)	0.36 (9.1)	0.24 (6.1)	0.30 (7.6)	0.31 (7.9)	0.88 (22)	1.28 (33)	1.86 (47)	1.22 (31)	1.32 (34)	0.90 (23)	0.37 (9.4)	0.25 (6.4)	9.29 (236.5)
Average snowfall inches (cm)	0.1 (0.25)	0.0 (0.0)	0.0 (0.0)	0.0 (0.0)	0.0 (0.0)	0.0 (0.0)	0.0 (0.0)	0.0 (0.0)	0.0 (0.0)	0.0 (0.0)	0.0 (0.0)	0.4 (1.0)	0.5 (1.25)
Average precipitation days (≥ 0.01 in)	2.1	1.6	1.6	1.5	3.2	4.3	6.3	4.5	5.1	3.4	2.4	1.7	37.7
Average snowy days (≥ 0.1 in)	0.1	0.0	0.0	0.0	0.0	0.0	0.0	0.0	0.0	0.0	0.0	0.0	0.1
Source 1: NOAA
Source 2: National Weather Service

== Economy ==
The Lajitas Golf Resort and Spa is a 20,000-acre golf resort business in Lajitas owned by Texas businessman Kelcy Warren, who bought the resort from previous owner Steve Smith while the business was going through financial distress. It is located on the Rio Grande, bordering Mexico, between Big Bend National Park and Big Bend Ranch State Park. The Robert E. Lee on Traveller statue is on display at the resort.

== Education ==
Lajitas is zoned to schools in the Terlingua Common School District. In 1912, Lajitas had a school with 50 students.

== Media ==
In the 1970s, the community had one telephone, and newspapers were delivered one day later than their normal dates. Additionally, televisions were a rarity among communities in the decade.

Frank Q. Dobbs directed his first film, Enter the Devil, in Lajitas in 1972.

== Infrastructure ==
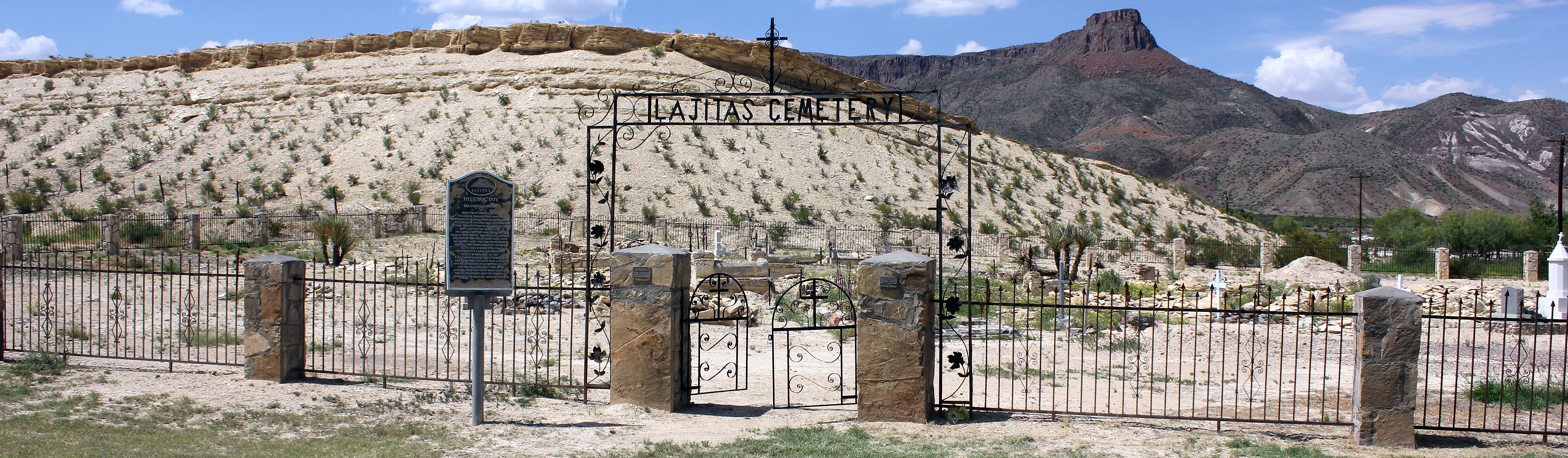
Lajitas Cemetery

=== Airport ===
Due to the remoteness of the resort, Lajitas is served by the Lajitas International Airport, a private airport with a 6,503-foot (1,982 m) concrete runway. Regularly scheduled service between Lajitas and Dallas Love Field is available on JSX.

=== Military bases ===
The 90th Fighter Squadron of the United States Army Border Air Patrol had a sector that traveled to Lajitas from Eagle Pass. The 11th Bomb Squadron operated from Marfa Field along the Rio Grande to El Paso.

== See also ==
- List of unincorporated communities in Texas
