= San Vicente Independent School District =

School district in Texas, United States

San Vicente Independent School District is a public school district in Brewster County, Texas (USA).

The district has one school – San Vicente Elementary – located on the grounds of Big Bend National Park. It serves students in grades kindergarten through twelve who are dependents of people who work at the park.

== History ==
The school district began in 1898. Thomas J. Miller constructed the first San Vicente ISD school building.

The 1929 stock market crash prompted school districts to consolidate into the San Vicente school in 1930. In 1937, the building was destroyed by a tornado, and so another school building from Dugout Wells was moved and began serving as the San Vicente ISD building.

The original San Vicente School stopped functioning in 1945 as the national park went into operation.

Circa 1951, the school was relocated to the Panther Junction area so employees of Big Bend National Park had a local school for their children. The school had 27 students in 1992. Previously high school aged students were bused to Alpine Independent School District's Alpine High School. In 1993, San Vicente ISD began collaborating with Terlingua ISD on the establishment on a new high school. San Vicente began sending students to Big Bend High when it was established in 1996, as San Vicente itself did not have enough of a taxation base to establish its own high school.

As of 2007, the Texas State Energy Conservation Office awards San Vicente ISD money due to the colonias served by the district.

In 2009, the school district was rated "academically acceptable" by the Texas Education Agency.

In 2020, the district had seven employees and five students, making it the smallest school district in Texas.

Circa 2025, San Vicente ISD started allowing high schoolers to enroll.
