= Black Gap Wildlife Management Area =

Protected area in Brewster County, Texas

- Black Gap WMA or BGWMA
- Location within Texas
- Location: Brewster County, Texas, United States
- Nearest city: Tesnus, Texas (35.53 miles); Rosenfeld, Texas (38.33 miles)
- Coordinates: 29°33′48″N 102°53′52″W (geographic center)
- Area: 103,000 acres (420 km^{2})
- Governing body: Texas Parks and Wildlife Department
- Website: Caddo-LBJ National Grasslands

Black Gap Wildlife Management Area (Black Gap WMA) is a 103,000 acres (42,000 ha) protected area in Brewster County, Texas. The goal is wildlife study and regulated hunting of mainly javelina, deer, and gamebirds.

== Location ==
The entrance is located 55 miles south of Marathon, TX. Take 385 south from Marathon to FM 2627, turn left, the BGWMA entrance will be approximately 18 miles on the left. The WMA is 35.53 miles (57.18 km) from Tesnus and 38.33 miles (61.69 km) from Rosenfeld, Texas.

== Description ==
The land is predominantly desert wilderness. There are an estimated 30 miles of boundaries along the Rio Grande. The Santiago Mountains run through the WMA towards the Rio Grande. Of prominence is the 6,522 foot (1,988 m) Santiago Peak In 2025, the Nature Conservancy in Texas (TNC) purchased the 671-acre Heath Canyon Ranch, which was added to the WMA. The southern border of the ranch sits along the Rio Grande in an area designated a National Wild and Scenic River.
