= Ward Mountain (Texas) =

Mountain in Texas, United States

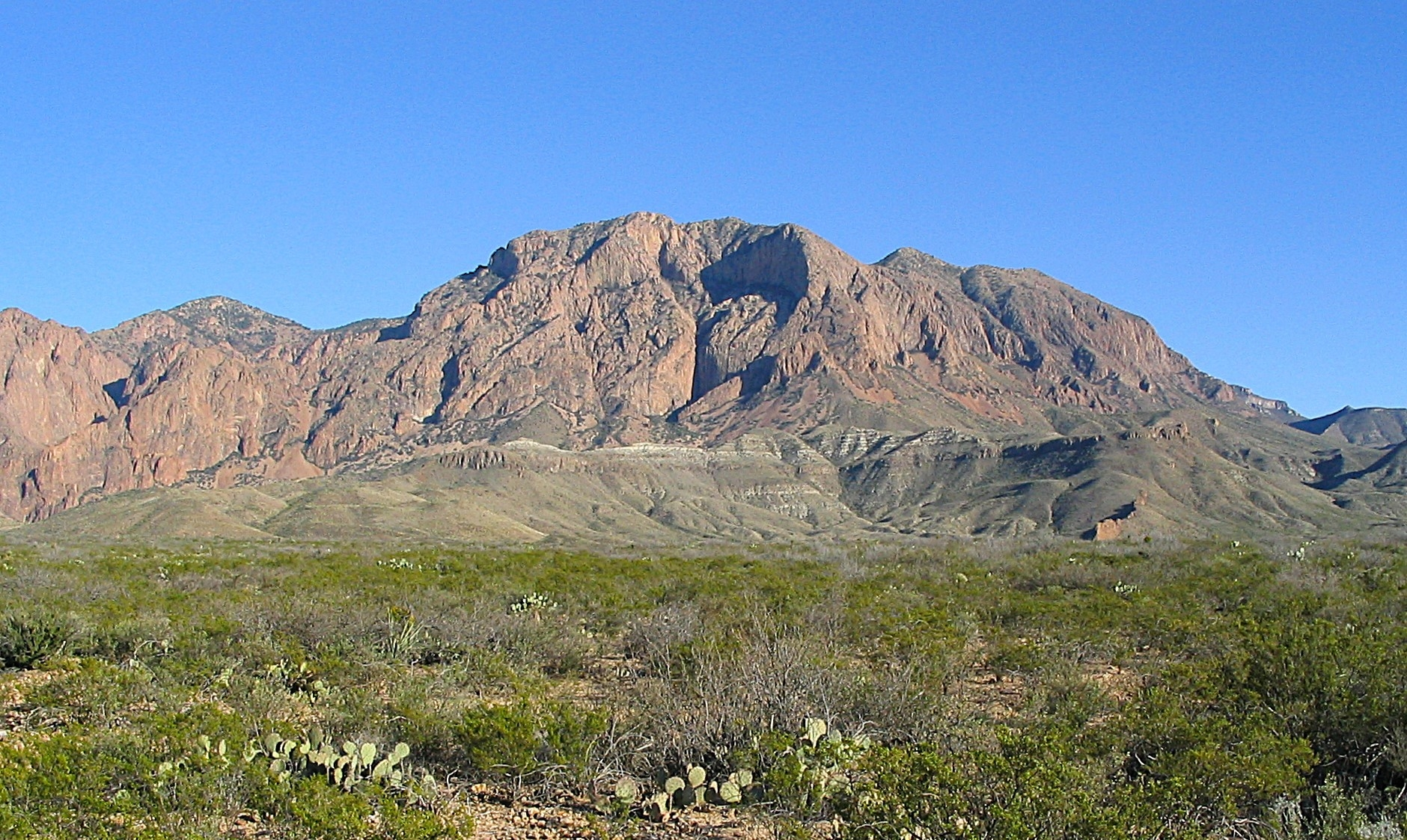
- West aspect

Highest point
- Elevation: 6,926 ft (2,111 m)
- Prominence: 258 ft (79 m)
- Isolation: 0.43 mi (0.69 km)
- Coordinates: 29°15′25″N 103°20′07″W

Geography
- Location within Texas Location within the United States
- Country: United States
- State: Texas
- County: Brewster
- Protected area: Big Bend National Park
- Parent range: Chisos Mountains
- Topo map: USGS The Basin

Geology
- Rock age: Oligocene
- Rock type: Igneous rock

Ward Mountain is a 6,926-foot-elevation (2,111-meter) summit in Brewster County, Texas, United States.

== Description ==
Ward Mountain is located on the west side of the Chisos Mountains in Big Bend National Park. The mountain is composed of rhyolite (volcanic rock) and Chisos Formation which formed during the Oligocene period. Topographic relief is significant as the summit rises 2,500 feet (762 m) above Cottonwood Creek near Ward Spring in 1.25 miles (2.01 km). Based on the Köppen climate classification, Ward Mountain is located in a hot arid climate zone with hot summers and mild winters. Any scant precipitation runoff from the mountain's slopes drains into Cottonwood Creek which is part of the Rio Grande watershed. The lower slopes of the mountain are covered by juniper, oak, and piñon. The mountain's toponym was officially adopted on March 9, 1939, by the United States Board on Geographic Names. The namesake was Johnny Ward, a cowboy from the nearby G4 ranch. The G4 ranch manager Captain Jim Gillette trusted nineteen-year-old Johnny Ward who was sent by rail to Chicago in the late 1880s to buy cattle for the G4 Cattle Company. The G4 was one of the first large ranches of Big Bend, stretching from Oak Spring and The Window to Terlingua Creek and Aguja Fria to the west.

== See also ==
- List of mountain peaks of Texas
- Geography of Texas

== Gallery ==
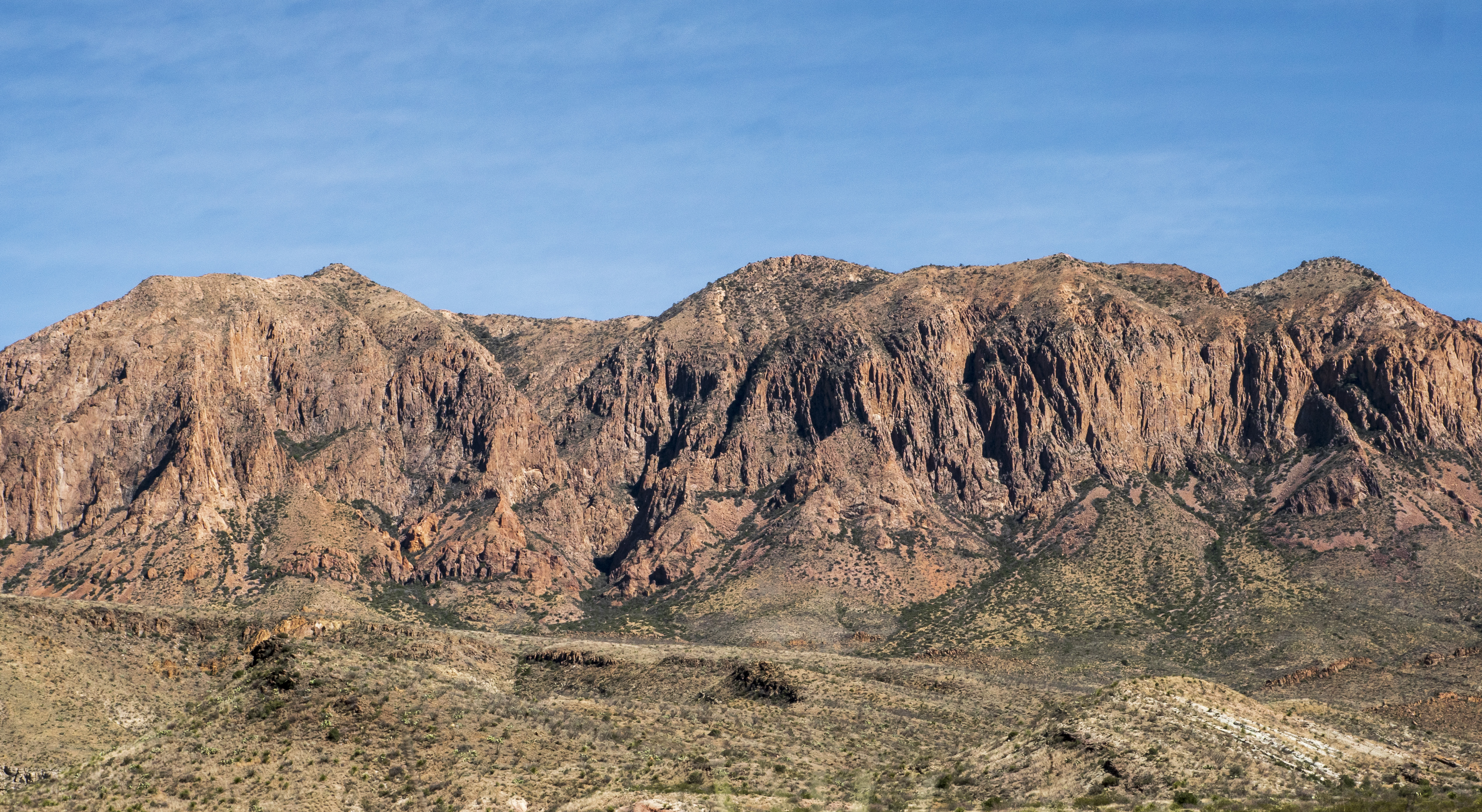
West aspect, summit to the left

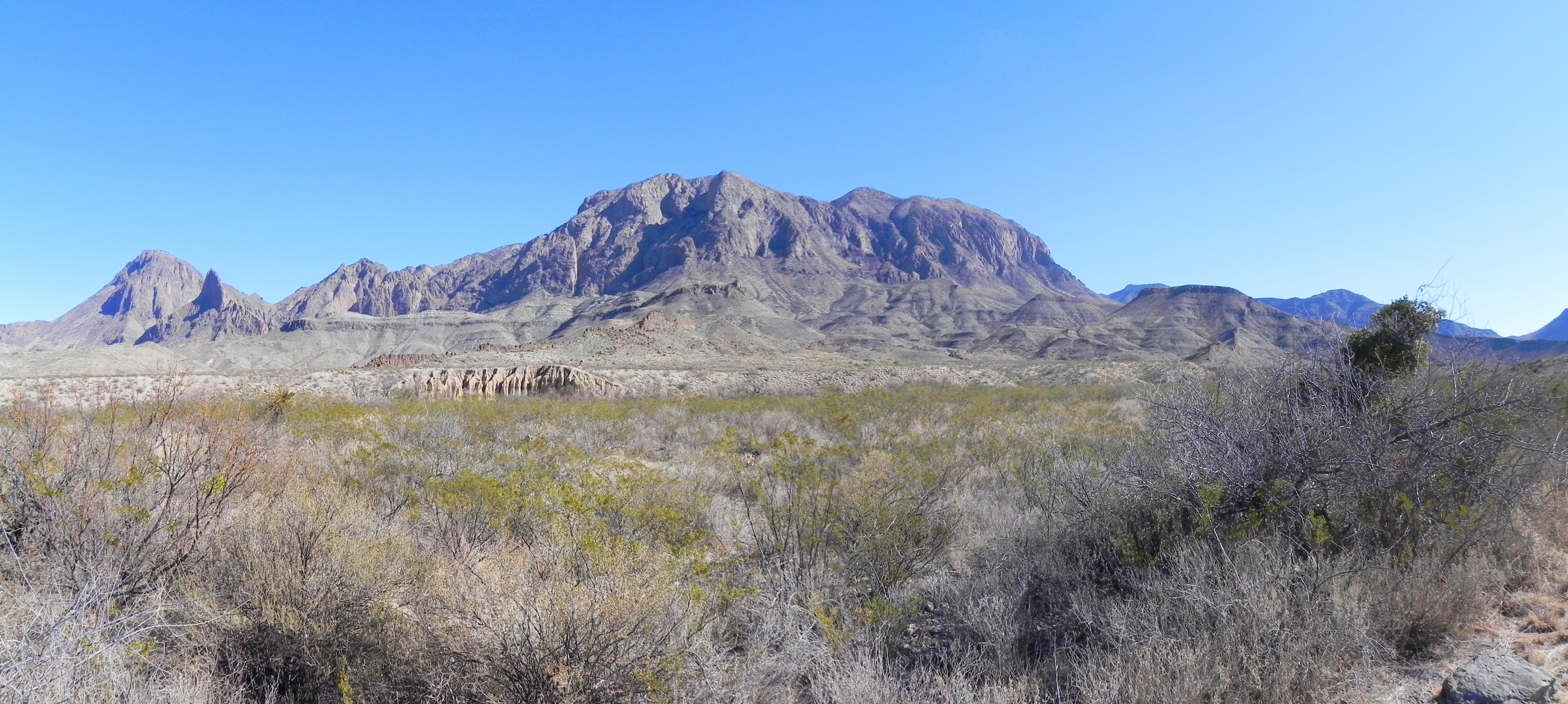
West aspect centered, with Vernon Bailey Peak to left

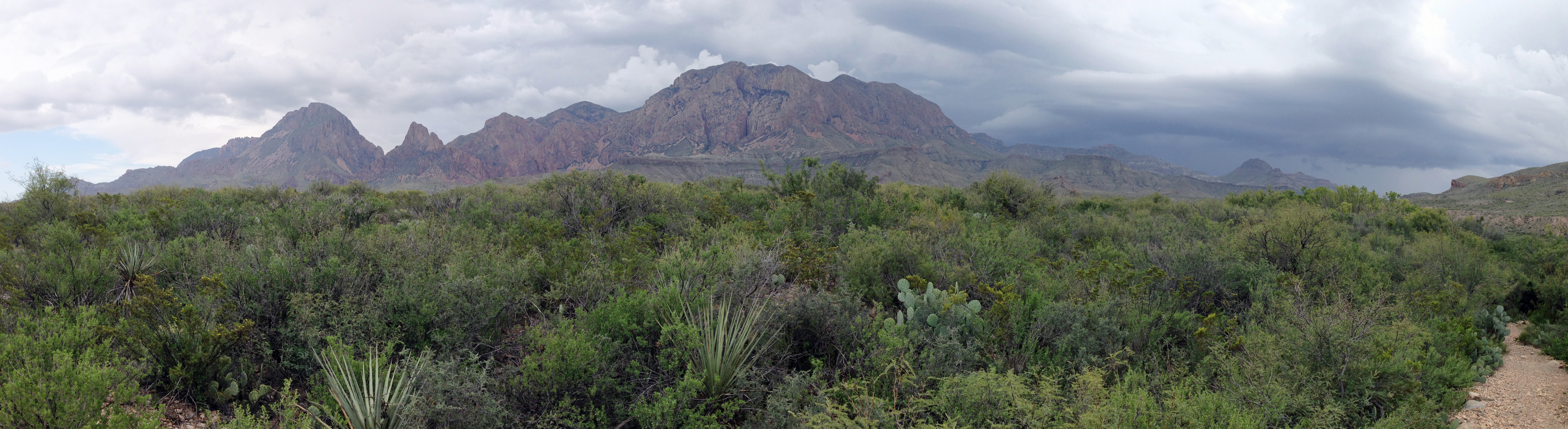
West aspect centered

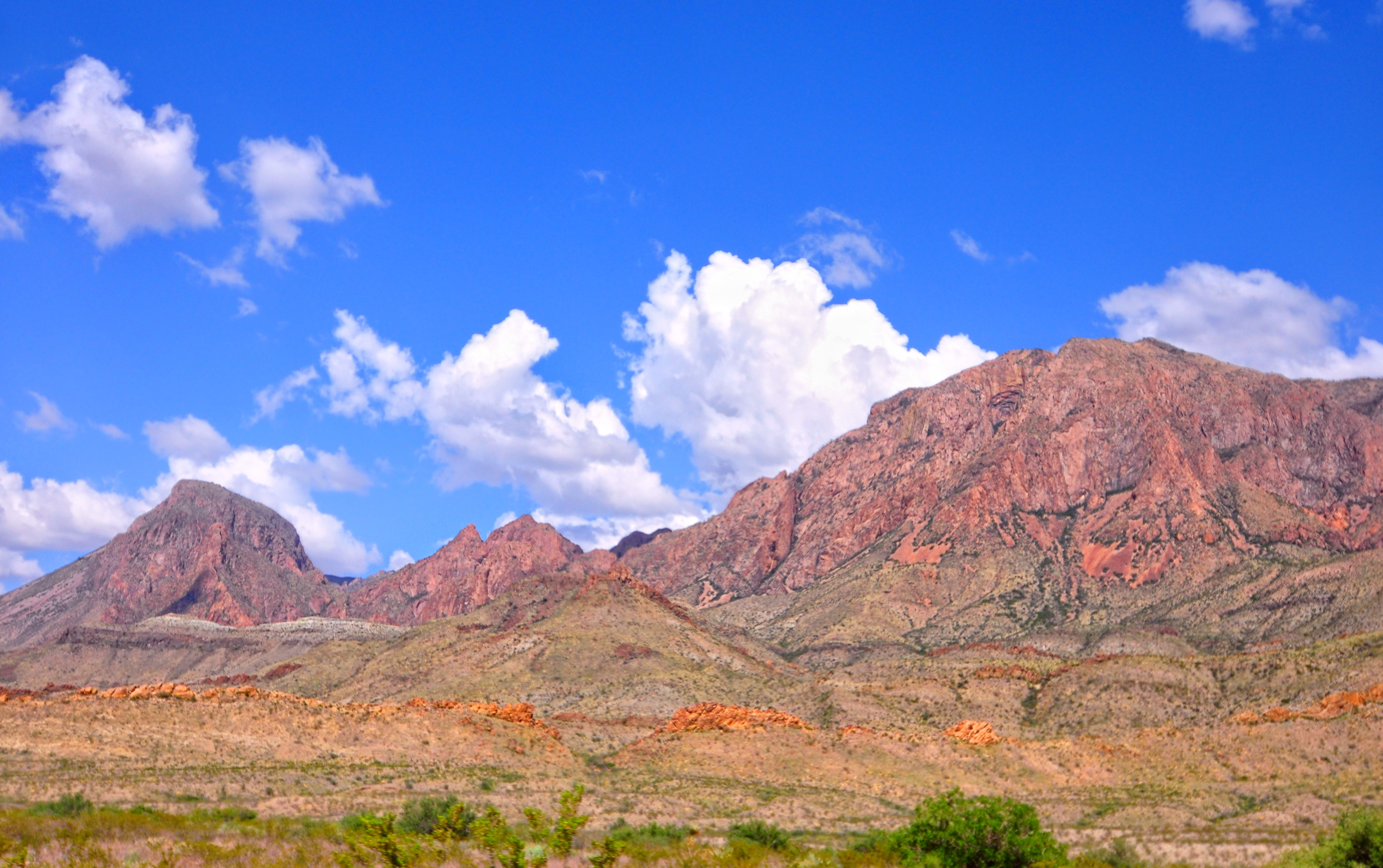
Ward Mountain to the right

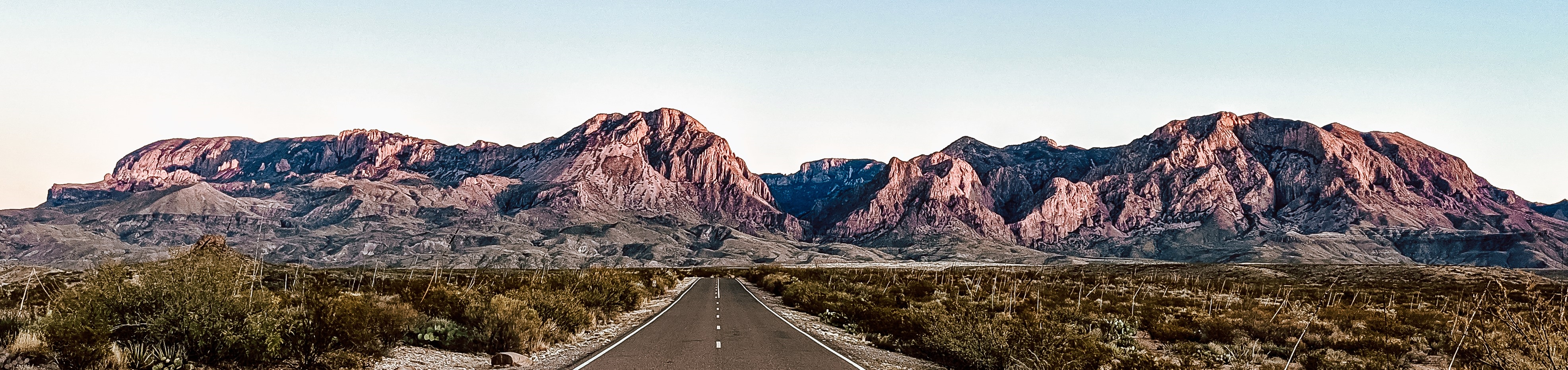
Chisos Mountains from northwest, road pointed toward Vernon Bailey Peak with Ward Mountain to the right
