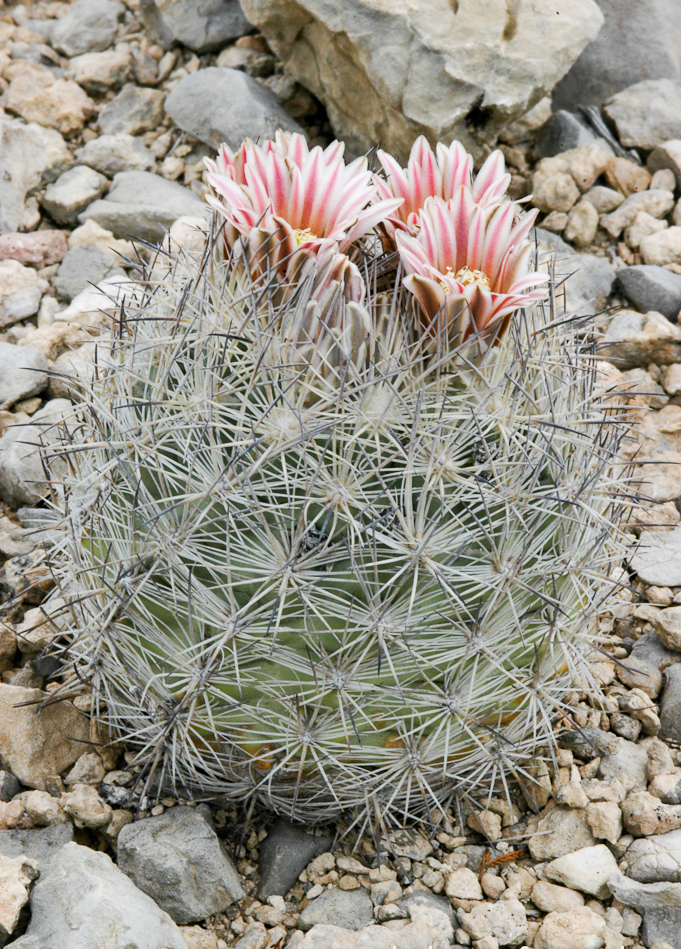

Conservation status
- Imperiled (NatureServe)
- CITES Appendix I

Scientific classification
- Kingdom: Plantae
- Clade: Tracheophytes
- Clade: Angiosperms
- Clade: Eudicots
- Order: Caryophyllales
- Family: Cactaceae
- Subfamily: Cactoideae
- Genus: Sclerocactus
- Species: S. mariposensis

Binomial name
- Sclerocactus mariposensis (Hester) N.P.Taylor

Synonyms
- Echinocactus mariposensis (Hester) D.Weniger, not validly publ.; Echinomastus mariposensis Hester; Echinomastus mariposensis subsp. fischeri Halda & Sladk.; Neolloydia mariposensis (Hester) L.D.Benson; Pediocactus mariposensis (Hester) Halda

= Sclerocactus mariposensis =

Species of cactus

Sclerocactus mariposensis, synonyms including Echinomastus mariposensis and Neolloydia mariposensis, is a rare species of cactus known by the common names Lloyd's fishhook cactus, golfball cactus, silver column cactus, and Mariposa cactus. It is native to a section of territory straddling the border between Brewster County, Texas, in the United States, and the states of Coahuila and Nuevo León in northeastern Mexico. It has been federally listed as a threatened species in the United States since 1979.

== Habitat ==
This tiny cactus grows at about 30 sites in Texas and Coahuila, many of which are located within Big Bend National Park and the Black Gap Wildlife Management Area. In Coahuila it has been observed near Cuatro Ciénegas and Monclova. It is named for the Mariposa Mine, a mercury mine in Texas, where it was first discovered. It was described in 1945. The plant grows in Chihuahuan Desert scrub amongst other plants such as beaked yucca (Yucca rostrata), creosote (Larrea tridentata), and lechuguilla (Agave lechuguilla), as well as many other cacti. It grows in barren, exposed, rocky habitat with substrates of limestone; it does not occur in the adjacent parts of the habitat where the rock is gypsum, and the related Sclerocactus warnockii fills its niche there. This cactus may grow alongside the bunched cory cactus (Coryphantha ramillosa), another threatened cactus species.

== Characteristics ==
This is a petite cactus growing up to 10 centimeters tall by 6 wide. The body is covered with areoles bearing spines. The central spines are up to 2 centimeters long and are white, gray, or yellow in color with brownish or bluish tips. Each areole also has many radial spines which are smaller and white or gray in color, sometimes with brown tips. The flowers are white, or pink fading to white over time, often with dark midstripes, and up to 3 centimeters long. The fruit is about a centimeter in length and yellow-green in color. Blooming occurs in February and March.

== Endangered status ==
Threats to this rare species have included mercury mining, petroleum exploration activities, off-road vehicles, and grazing. The worst threat has been poaching by cactus collectors. The collectors employed professional diggers to go into the habitat and retrieve this and other species of cacti, which were stockpiled, shipped away for sale, and sometimes discarded or wasted. The type locality of the cactus has been scoured for specimens and few are found there anymore. Plants in Big Bend National Park occur on rugged terrain and have generally been safe from collectors. In 1983 the cactus was placed on Appendix 1 of CITES in an effort to protect it from harvesting.
