= Marathon Elementary School =

Marathon Elementary School may refer to:

- Marathon Elementary School, Hopkinton, Massachusetts
- Elementary portion of Marathon Independent School District, Marathon, Texas

== See also ==
- Marathon Area Elementary School, Marathon, Wisconsin, Marathon School District
