= Battle of Peña Colorado Creek =

1861 battle in Texas, U.S.

- Part of Texas–Indian Wars, Apache Wars, American Civil War
Date	August 11, 1861
Location	Near Marathon, Texas
Result	Apache victory

Belligerents
Mescalero Apache	Confederate States of America

Commanders and leaders
Chief Nicolas	(Confederate States of America) Lt. Reuben Mays †

Strength
More than 80 warriors	14 cavalry and 1 civilian

Casualties and losses
Few	All 14 men including Lt. Mays are killed in battle

The Battle of Peña Colorado Creek was a small but major battle fought between the Mescalero Apache and the Confederate States of America that took place on August 11, 1861, near Marathon, Texas. The exact location of the battlefield is unknown but it was near the Peña Colorado Creek.

== Background ==
Before the battle, Mescalero Apaches under the lead of Chief Nicolas attacked the ranch of Manuel Musquiz, killing three herders and stealing some livestock. In response, Lieutenant Reuben Mays took 13 cavalrymen and a Mexican guide by the name of Juan Fernandez from Fort Davis to search for the Apache raiders. At the end of the day on August 10, 1861, the troops discovered the camp of Chief Nicolas’ band in a valley with intent on striking by the next morning.

== The Battle ==
On the morning of August 11, 1861, Lt. Mays and his cavalrymen began an assault on the camp, however he quickly realized that he was severely outnumbered, with Chief Nicolas’ band having more than 80 warriors. Mays and his men were being chased by the Apaches for a while, and were forced to take cover behind a large rock. Juan Fernandez went to go to Fort Davis to get help, however it would already be too late as Mays and his men would all be killed, in the middle of the west Texas desert.
