= Alfred S. Gage =

Alfred Stevens Gage (February 6, 1860 – June 23, 1928) was an American rancher and businessman who founded the A. S. Gage Ranch in the Trans-Pecos region of West Texas. At its greatest extent his ranch extended over 500,000 acres.

Gage was a native of Vermont who moved to San Antonio, Texas, where he became a successful businessman and banker. He then moved to Marathon, Texas seeking opportunity in ranching. In 1926-1927, he had the Gage Hotel constructed by the firm of Trost & Trost to offer visitors to Marathon better lodging. The building also served as his residence and headquarters for his local cattle and banking interests.
