= Post Park =

Park in Brewster County, Texas, United States

Coordinates: 30°09′31″N 103°17′32″W

Post Park is a small county park in Brewster County, Texas, United States. The park is the site of Peña Colorado Springs. This year-round spring long-provided fresh water to the Comanche and other nomadic native peoples, serving as a stop on the Comanche Trail. Beginning in 1879, the springs were the site of the United States Army's Camp Peña Colorado. In 1884, the 10th Cavalry, also known as the buffalo soldiers were stationed at the Camp. The Army abandoned the Camp in 1893. The land around the springs was donated to Brewster County in 1935.

Post Park is a site on the Texas Historical Commission's Texas Mountain Trail.
