= Chalk Mountains (Texas) =

Mountain range in Texas, United States

- Location within Texas

Highest point
- Elevation: 955 m (3,133 ft)

Geography
- Country: United States
- State: Texas
- District: Brewster County
- Range coordinates: 29°35′0.693″N 103°20′1.633″W
- Topo map: USGS Twin Peaks

The Chalk Mountains are a mountain range in Brewster County, Texas.
