= Vernon Bailey Peak =

Mountain in Texas, United States

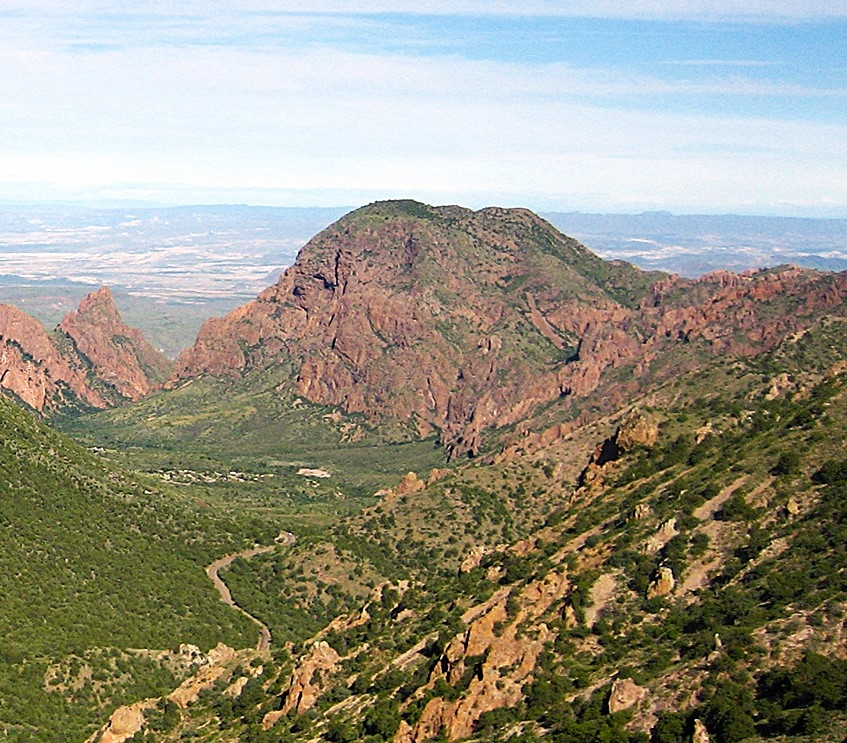
- East aspect

Highest point
- Elevation: 6,672 ft (2,034 m)
- Prominence: 597 ft (182 m)
- Isolation: 1.71 mi (2.75 km)
- Coordinates: 29°17′00″N 103°19′16″W

Naming
- Etymology: Vernon Orlando Bailey

Geography
- Location within Texas Location within the United States
- Country: United States
- State: Texas
- County: Brewster
- Protected area: Big Bend National Park
- Parent range: Chisos Mountains
- Topo map: USGS The Basin

Geology
- Rock age: Oligocene
- Rock type: Intrusive rock

Climbing
- Easiest route: class 3

Vernon Bailey Peak is a 6,672-foot-elevation (2,034-meter) summit in Brewster County, Texas, United States.

== Description ==
Vernon Bailey Peak is located in the Chisos Mountains. It ranks as the 12th-highest peak in Big Bend National Park and 77th-highest in Texas. The mountain is composed of intrusive rock which formed during the Oligocene period. Topographic relief is significant as the summit rises 2,070 feet (631 m) above Oak Canyon in 0.5 miles (0.80 km). Based on the Köppen climate classification, Vernon Bailey Peak is located in a hot arid climate zone with hot summers and mild winters. Any scant precipitation runoff from the mountain's slopes drains into Oak Creek which is part of the Rio Grande watershed. The lower slopes of the peak are covered by juniper, oak, and piñon. The mountain's toponym was officially adopted in 1945 by the United States Board on Geographic Names to remember Vernon Orlando Bailey (1864–1942), American naturalist who specialized in mammalogy and is best known for his biological surveys of Texas, New Mexico, North Dakota, and Oregon.

== See also ==
- List of mountain peaks of Texas
- Geography of Texas

== Gallery ==
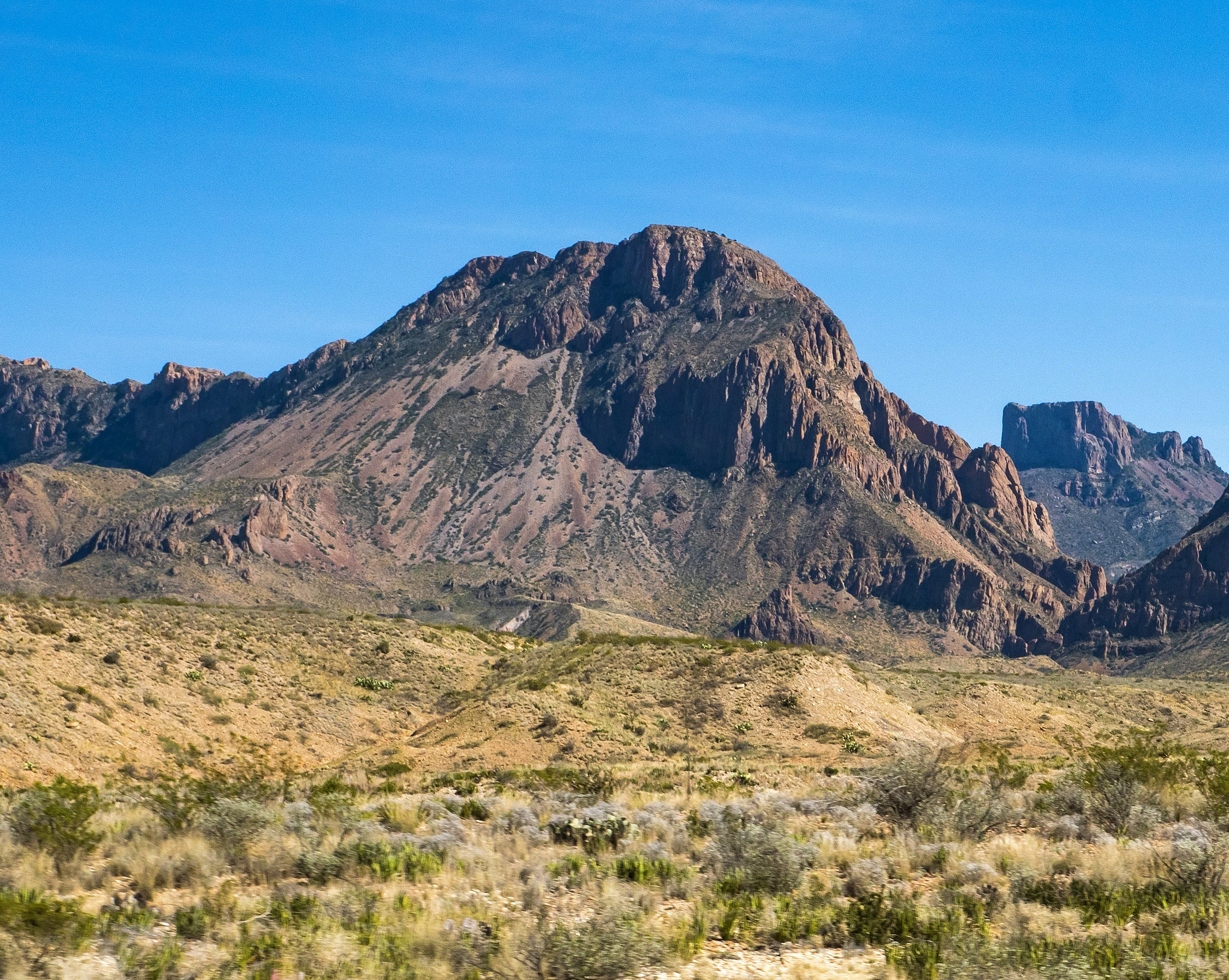
West aspect

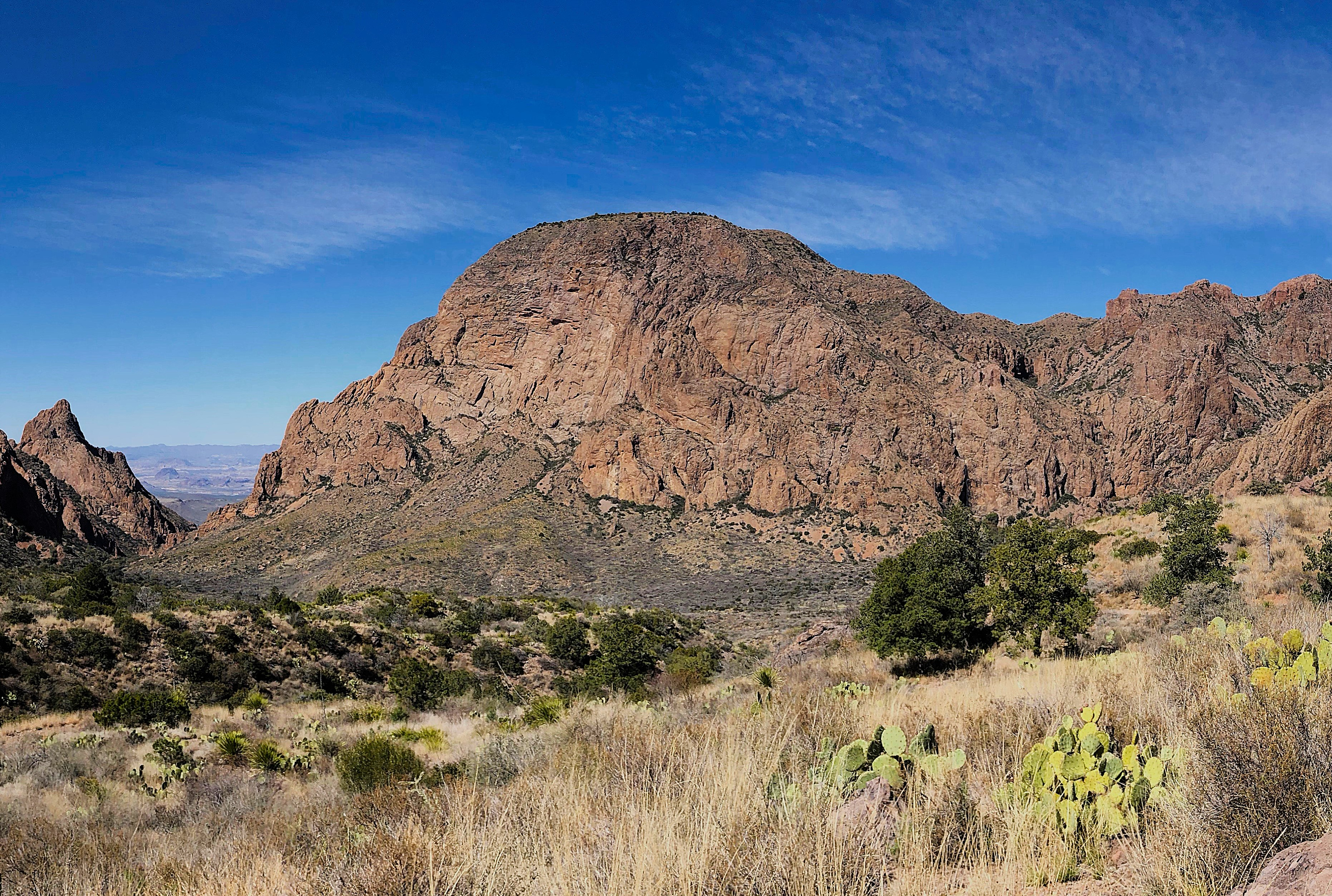
East aspect

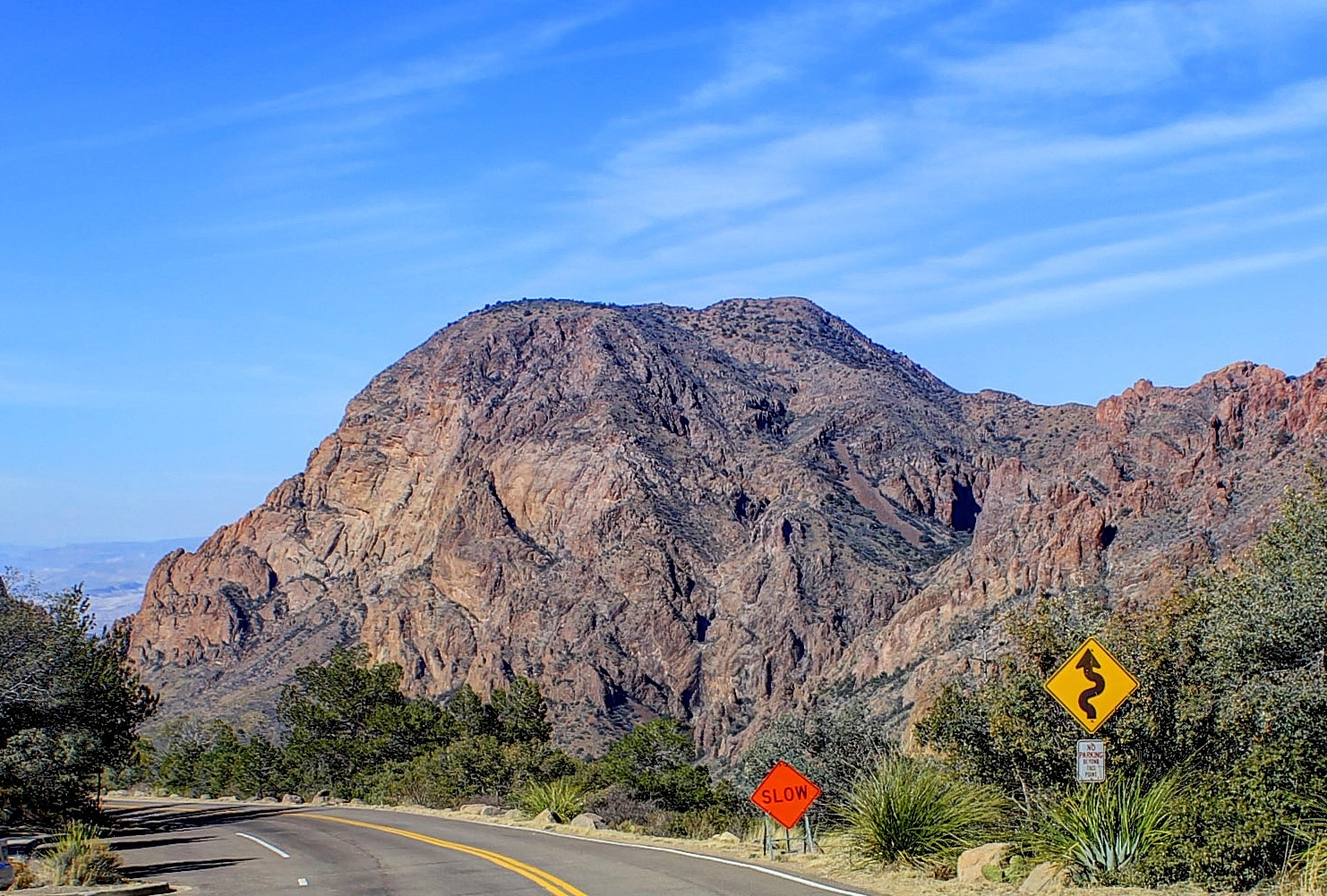
East aspect

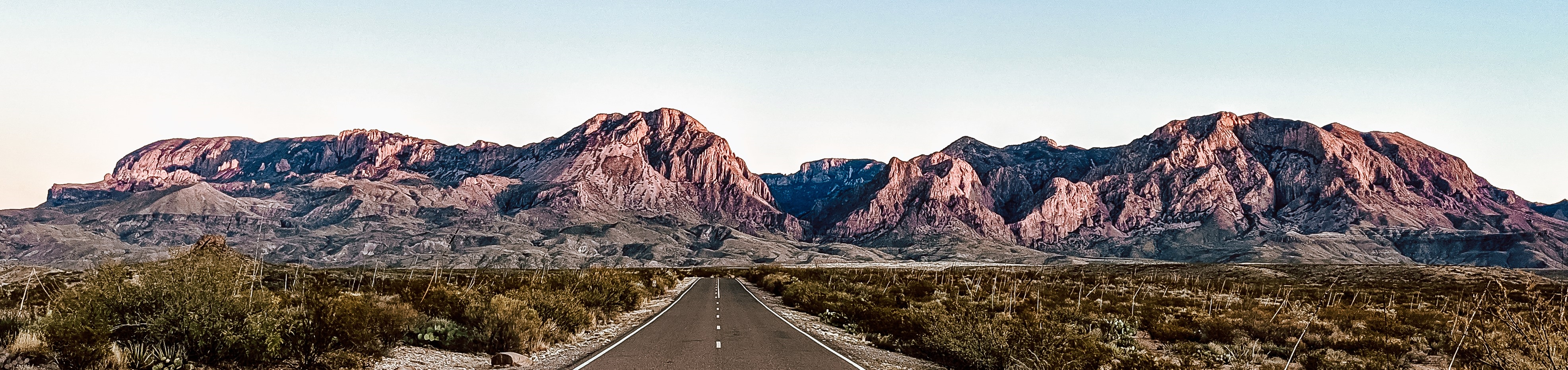
Chisos Mountains, road pointed toward northwest aspect of Vernon Bailey Peak

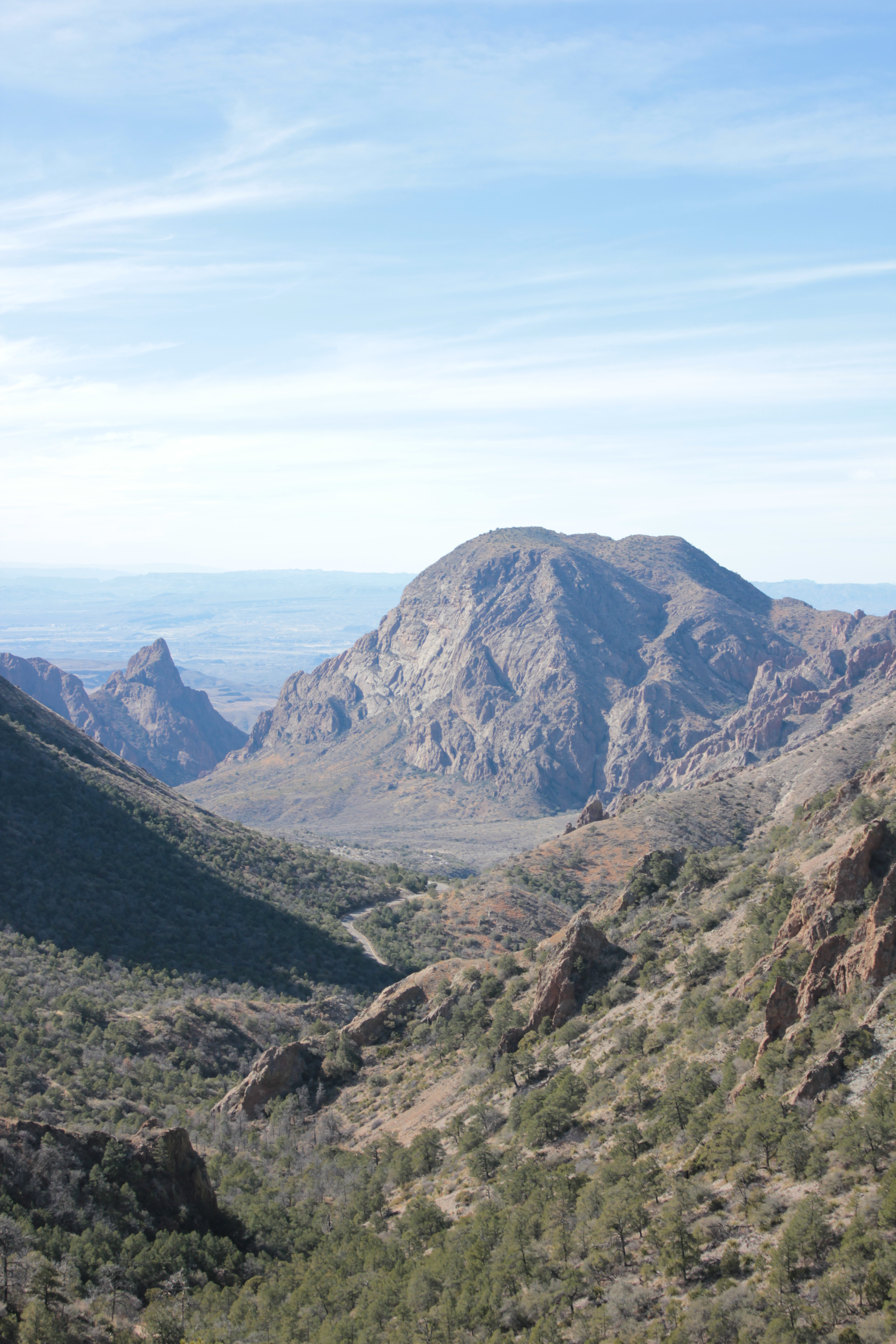

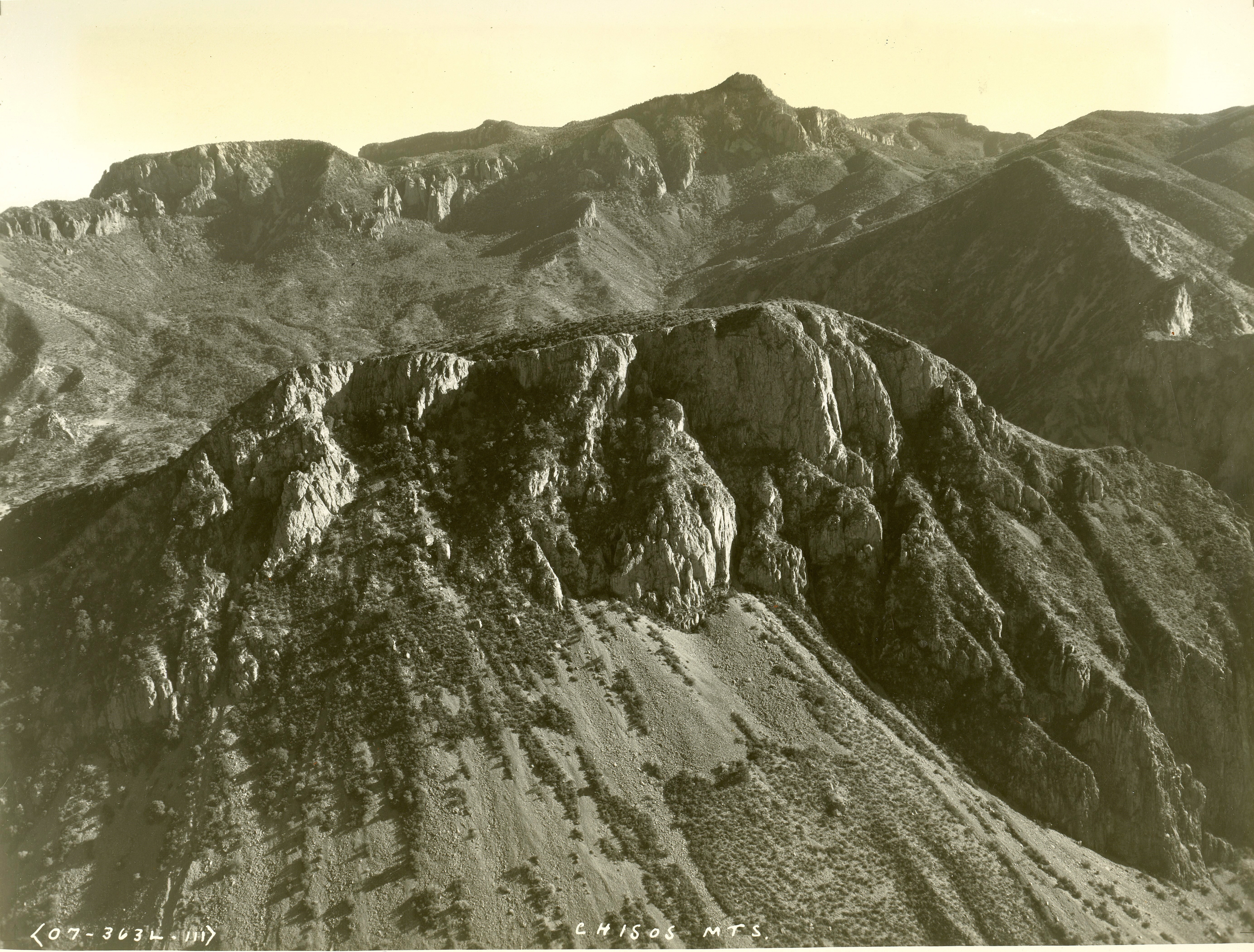
Aerial view of north aspect of Vernon Bailey Peak in 1937.
Emory Peak at the top of frame in the distance.
