= Arick Village, Texas =

- Unincorporated community, Census-designated place
- Nickname: Cowhead Ranch
- Motto: Come on over
- Interactive map of Arick Village, Texas
- Coordinates: 29.646829°N 103.538336°W
- Country: United States
- State: Texas
- County: Brewster

Population (2014)
  - Total: 550
- Time zone: UTC-6 (Central (CST))
  - Summer (DST): UTC-5 (CDT)
- ZIP code: 79830-79832
- Area code: 432

Arick Village is the unofficial name of a portion of the Terlingua Ranch unincorporated community located in Brewster County, Texas, United States. Arick Village is located east of Highway 118, and west of 9-Point Mesa (outside of Terlingua). Big Bend National Park and Big Bend Ranch State Park are located nearby.
