= Altuda, Texas =

- Unincorporated community
- Location within Texas Location within the United States
- Coordinates: 30°18′08″N 103°27′29″W
- Country: United States
- State: Texas
- County: Brewster
- Elevation: 4,643 ft (1,415 m)
- Time zone: UTC-6 (Central (CST))
  - Summer (DST): UTC-5 (CDT)
- Area code: 432
- GNIS feature ID: 1377932

Altuda is an unincorporated community in northern Brewster County, Texas, United States.
