= USS LST-483 =

1942 LST-1-class tank landing ship

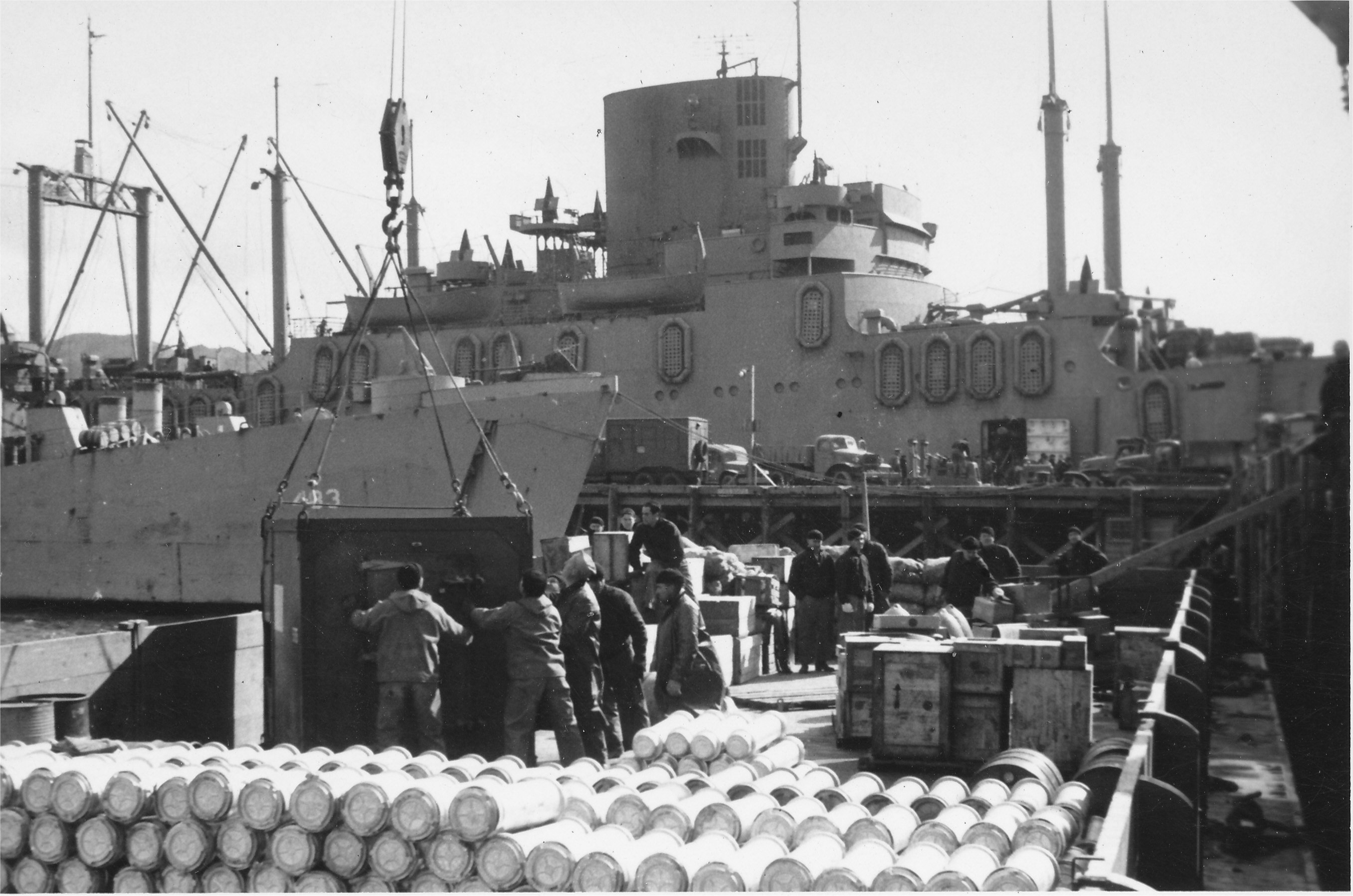
- LST-483 and President Monroe docked at Adak, Alaska, 20 September 1943. As SeaBees load a barge with material for the airfield they are building at Tanaga Island.

History

United States
- Name: LST-483
- Ordered: as a Type S3-M-K2 hull, MCE hull 1003
- Builder: Permanente Metals Corporation, Richmond, California
- Yard number: 38
- Laid down: 21 September 1942
- Launched: 30 December 1942
- Commissioned: 3 May 1943
- Decommissioned: 10 February 1946
- Identification: Hull symbol: LST-483; Code letters: NGUQ
- Honors and awards: 4 × battle stars
- Fate: assigned to Commander Naval Forces Far East

Japan
- Operator: Shipping Control Authority for Japan
- In service: 10 February 1946
- Out of service: unknown
- Renamed: Q050
- Fate: returned to USN

United States
- Name: Q050
- Renamed: Brewster County, 1 July 1955
- Namesake: Brewster County, Texas
- Stricken: 11 August 1955
- Fate: Sunk as target

General characteristics
- Class & type: LST-1-class tank landing ship
- Displacement: 4,080 long tons (4,145 t) full load; 2,160 long tons (2,190 t) landing
- Length: 328 ft (100 m) oa
- Beam: 50 ft (15 m)
- Draft: Full load: 8 ft 2 in (2.49 m) forward; 14 ft 1 in (4.29 m) aft; Landing at 2,160 t: 3 ft 11 in (1.19 m) forward; 9 ft 10 in (3.00 m) aft
- Installed power: 2 × 900 hp (670 kW) Electro-Motive Diesel 12-567A diesel engines; 1,700 shp (1,300 kW)
- Propulsion: 1 × Falk main reduction gears; 2 × Propellers
- Speed: 12 kn (22 km/h; 14 mph)
- Range: 24,000 nmi (44,000 km; 28,000 mi) at 9 kn (17 km/h; 10 mph) while displacing 3,960 long tons (4,024 t)
- Boats & landing craft carried: 2 or 6 x LCVPs
- Capacity: 2,100 tons oceangoing maximum; 350 tons main deckload
- Troops: 16 officers, 147 enlisted men
- Complement: 13 officers, 104 enlisted men
- Armament: Varied, ultimate armament; 2 × twin 40 mm (1.57 in) Bofors guns; 4 × single 40 mm Bofors guns; 12 × 20 mm (0.79 in) Oerlikon cannons

Service record
- Part of: LST Flotilla 3
- Operations: Capture and occupation of Saipan (15 June–30 July 1944); Tinian Capture and occupation (24–30 July 1944); Leyte landings (20 October 1944); Assault and occupation of Okinawa Gunto (1–9 April 1945)
- Awards: American Campaign Medal; Asiatic–Pacific Campaign Medal; World War II Victory Medal; Navy Occupation Service Medal w/Asia Clasp; Philippine Republic Presidential Unit Citation; Philippine Liberation Medal

USS LST-483/Brewster County (LST-483) was an LST-1-class tank landing ship built for the United States Navy during World War II. Later renamed for Brewster County, Texas, she was the only US Naval vessel to bear the name.

== Construction ==
LST-483 was laid down on 21 September 1942, under Maritime Commission (MARCOM) contract, MC hull 1002, by Kaiser Shipyards, Yard No. 4, Richmond, California; launched on 30 December 1942; and commissioned on 3 May 1943.

== Service history ==
During World War II, LST-483 was assigned to the Asiatic-Pacific Theater and participated in the following operations: the Capture and Occupation of Saipan June and July 1944; the Tinian Capture and Occupation July 1944; the Leyte landings October 1944; and the Assault and Occupation of Okinawa Gunto April 1945.

== Post-war service ==
Following the war, LST-483 performed occupation duty in the Far East until early February, 1946. Upon her return to the United States, she was decommissioned on 10 February 1946. The tank landing ship was renamed USS Brewster County (LST-483) on 1 July 1955, after a county in Texas. Her name was struck from the Naval Vessel Register on 11 August 1955, and she was later sunk as a target.

== Awards ==
LST-483 earned four battle stars for World War II service.

== Notes ==
Citations

== Bibliography ==
Online resources

- "LST-483". Dictionary of American Naval Fighting Ships. Naval History and Heritage Command. This article incorporates text from this source, which is in the public domain.
- "Kaiser Permanente No. 4, Richmond CA". ShipbuildingHistory.com. 5 February 2014.
- "USS LST-483". NavSource. 9 October 2015.
