= A. S. Gage Ranch =

Cattle ranch in Texas, United States

Coordinates: 29.9649°N 102.9377°W

Location in Texas

The A. S. Gage Ranch is a 190,000-acre (770 km^{2}) cattle ranch located in Brewster and Presidio Counties in west Texas. Today's ranch is only a part of what was a once much larger operation founded in 1883 by Alfred S. Gage. It is still in the family, being owned and operated by Alfred's great grandchildren who are children of Alfred Negley, Joan Kelleher and Roxana Hayne. The operations consist of cattle raising and hunting.
