= Marathon Independent School District =

School district in Texas, United States

Marathon School
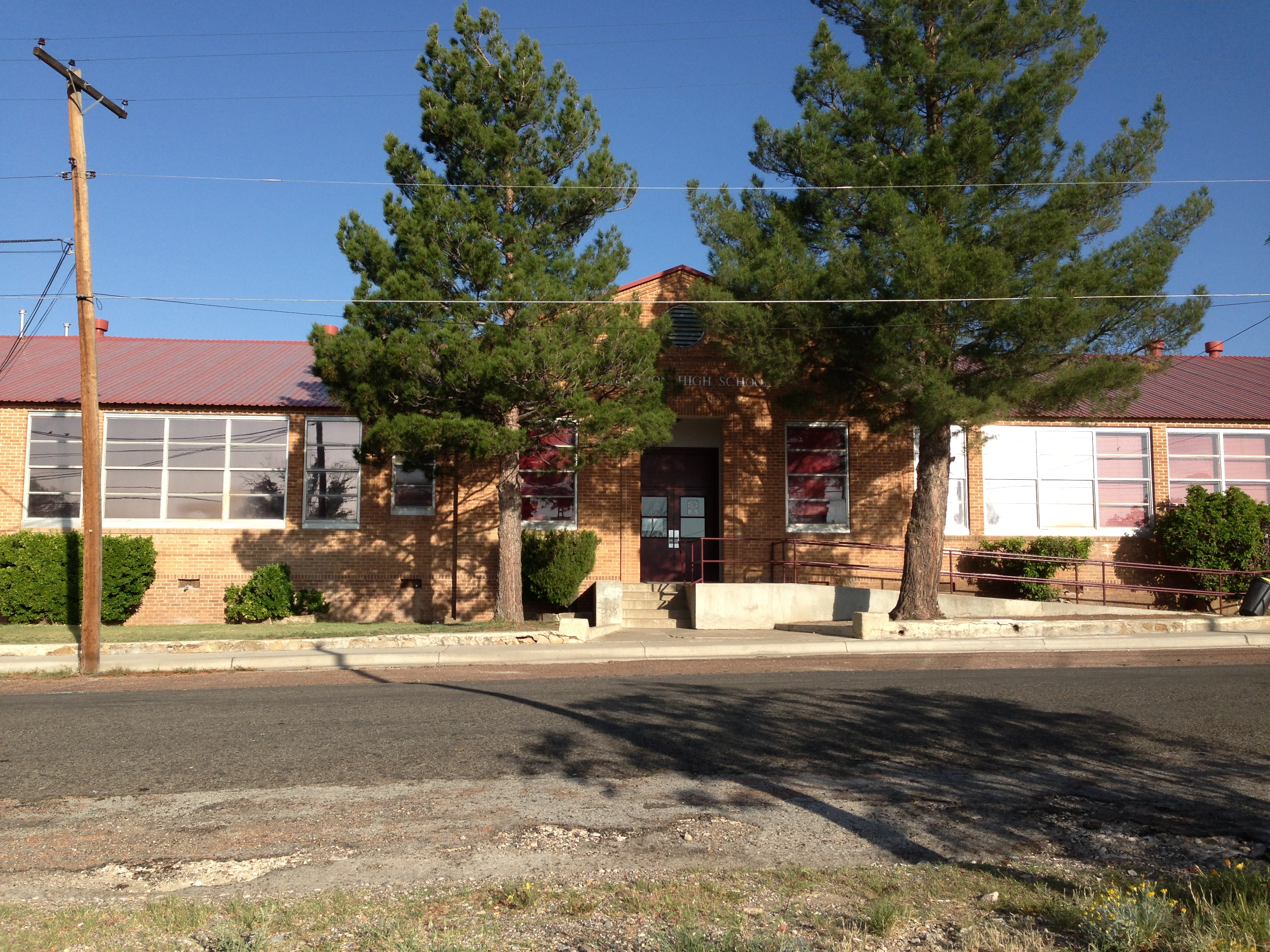
- Marathon School

Location
- 109 NE 5th Street; Marathon, Texas 79842; United States; 30.210280°N 103.244020°W

Information
- School type: Public high school
- School district: Marathon Independent School District
- Superintendent: Guadalupe Singh
- Teaching staff: 11.62 (FTE)
- Grades: PK-12
- Enrollment: 59 (2023-2024)
- Student to teacher ratio: 5.08
- Colors: Maroon & White
- Athletics conference: UIL Class A
- Mascot: Mustangs
- Website: Marathon ISD website

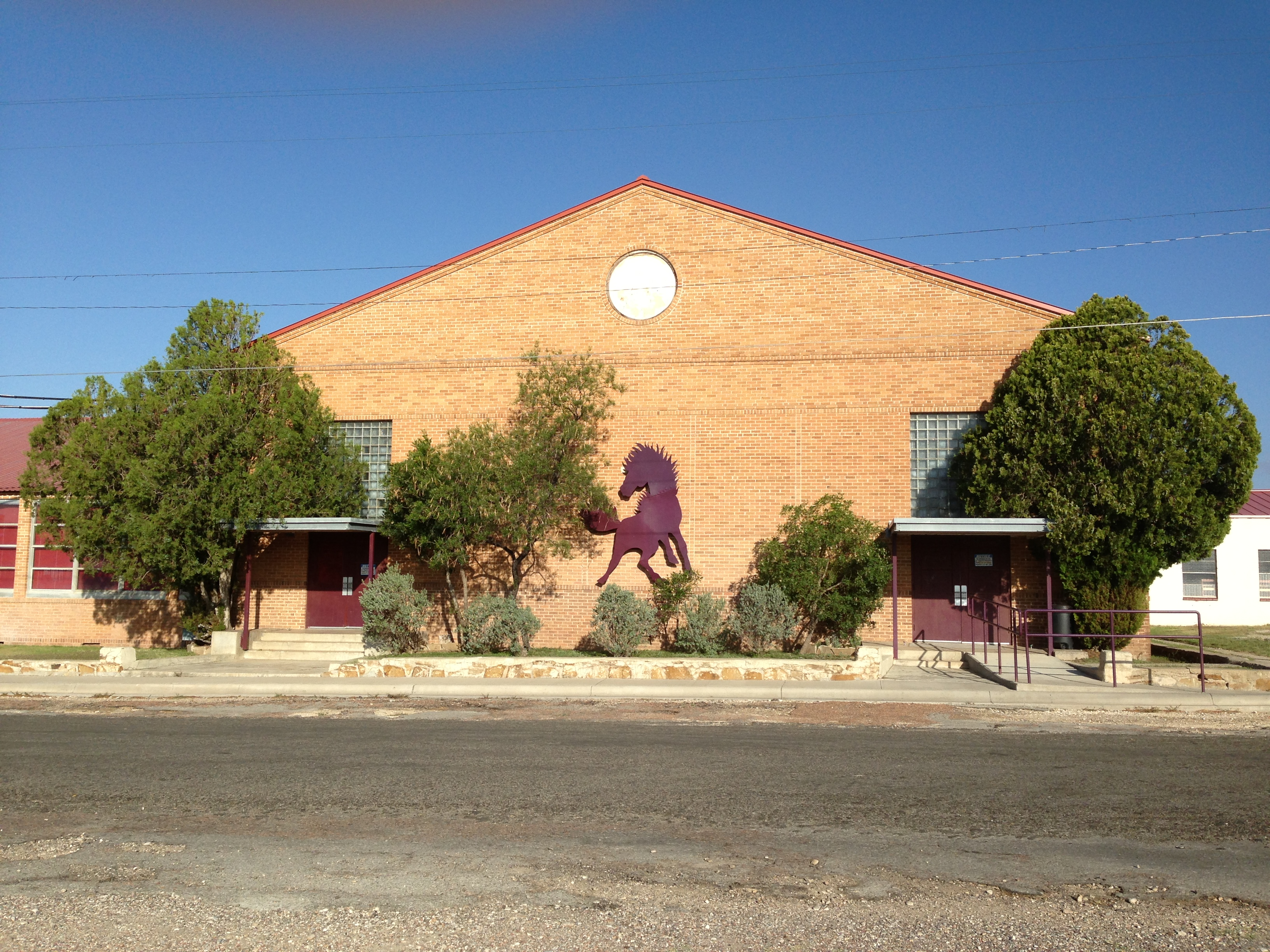
Marathon School

Marathon Independent School District is a school district based in Marathon, a census-designated place in Brewster County, Texas, United States.

Marathon ISD serves Marathon and a few surrounding areas of northeastern Brewster County. The district has one K-12 school, with two buildings: a secondary school building and an elementary school building.

It is classified as a 1A school by the UIL. Typically due to its isolation, Marathon generally has the lowest high school enrollment in the state. Marathon's secondary division serves grades 7-12. For the 2024-2025 school year, the school was given a "C" by the Texas Education Agency.

== History ==
As of 2007, the Texas State Energy Conservation Office awards Marathon ISD money due to the colonias served by the district.

In 2009, the school district was rated "recognized" by the Texas Education Agency.

== Athletics ==
The Marathon Mustangs compete in the following sports -

- Basketball
- Cross Country
- Golf
- Tennis
- Track and Field

=== State titles ===
- Football –
  - 1974(6M), 1976(6M)

(Both teams were undefeated).

==== State Finalist ====
- Football –
  - 1973(6M), 1975(6M), 1977(6M)

Marathon was also undefeated in 1969 and 1970.

== See also ==
Other high schools in Brewster County:

- Alpine High School
- Big Bend High School
