= Rosenfeld, Texas =

- Unincorporated community
- Location within Texas Location within the United States
- Country: United States
- State: Texas
- County: Brewster
- Elevation: 3,671 ft (1,119 m)
- Time zone: UTC-6 (Central (CST))
  - Summer (DST): UTC-5 (CDT)
- Area code: 432
- GNIS feature ID: 1380908

Rosenfeld is an unincorporated community in west central Brewster County, Texas, United States. It is 73 miles (117 km) east of Alpine and 25 miles (40 km) west of Sanderson. Little is known about Rosenfeld, except that it is on a connecting road to U.S. Highway 90 and is a former stop on the Southern Pacific Railroad.
