= Marathon, Texas =

- Census-designated place
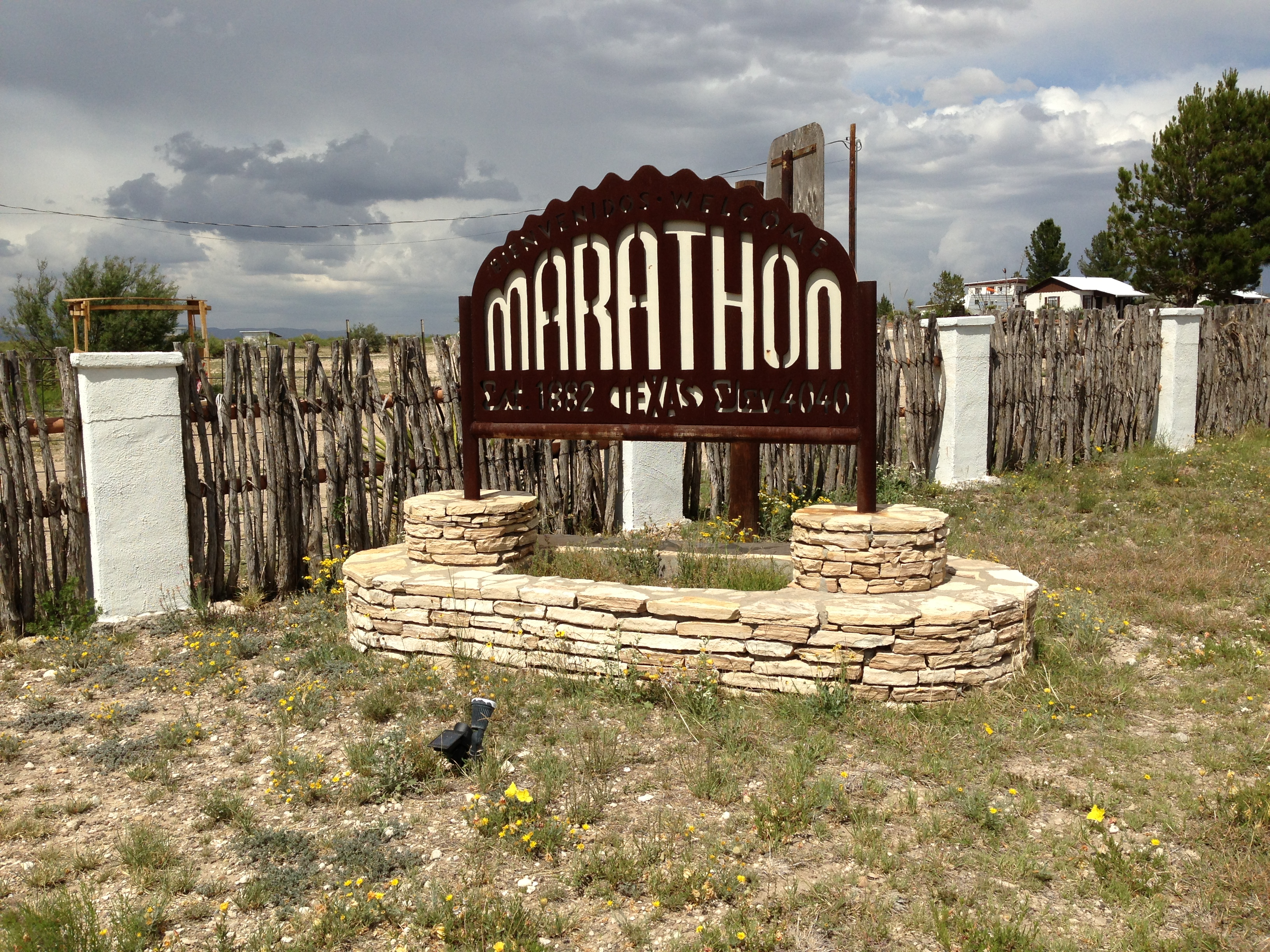
- Sign of Marathon

- Coordinates: 30°13′00″N 103°14′56″W
- Country: United States
- State: Texas
- County: Brewster

Area
  - Total: 5.3 sq mi (13.6 km^{2})
  - Land: 5.3 sq mi (13.6 km^{2})
  - Water: 0 sq mi (0.0 km^{2})
- Elevation: 4,101 ft (1,250 m)

Population (2020)
  - Total: 410
  - Density: 78/sq mi (30/km^{2})
- Time zone: UTC-6 (Central (CST))
  - Summer (DST): UTC-5 (CDT)
- ZIP code: 79842
- Area code: 432
- FIPS code: 48-46572
- GNIS feature ID: 2408173

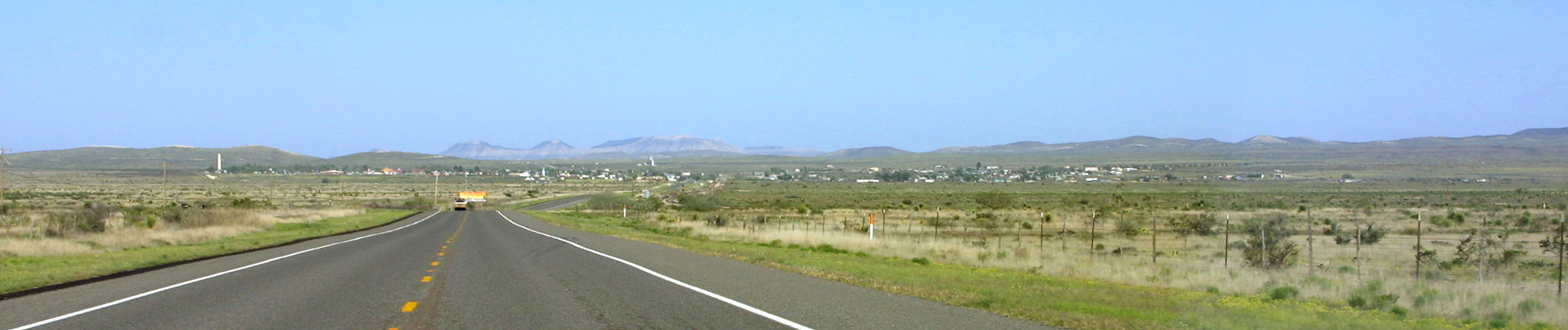
A panoramic view of Marathon, Texas.

Marathon (/ˈmærəθən/) is a census-designated place (CDP) in Brewster County, Texas, United States. The population was 410 at the 2020 census, down from 430 in 2010, 470 in 2007, and 455 in 2000.

As of 2012, Marathon services tourists traveling to Big Bend National Park.

The Marathon Chamber of Commerce, a 501(c)(6), holds meetings quarterly.

== History ==
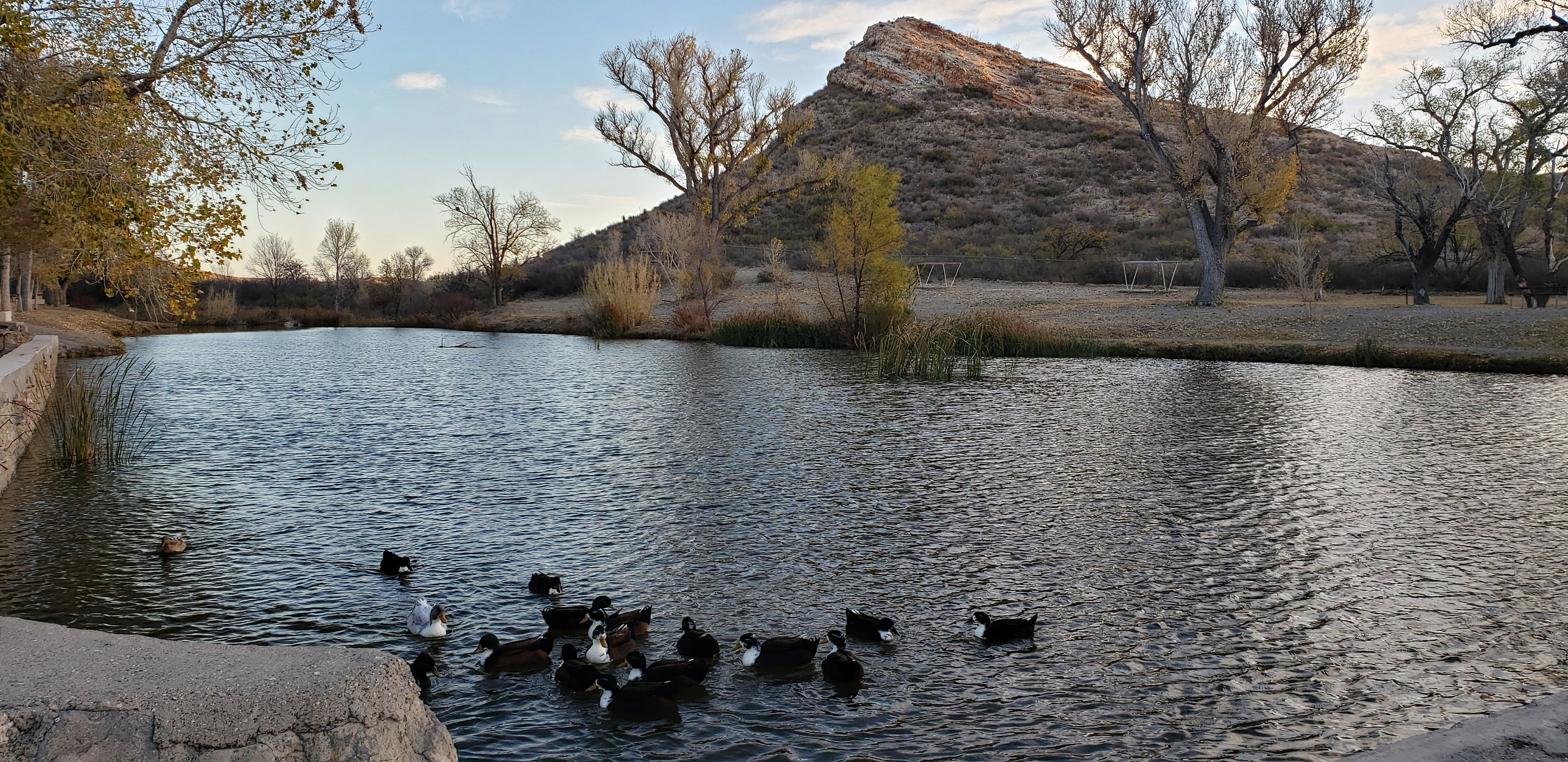
Fort Peña Colorado. The post park is five miles south of Marathon

In 1927 local rancher Alfred S. Gage commissioned El-Paso architect Henry Trost to build a hotel in Marathon. The Gage Hotel opened in 1927, and also served as Gage’s office until his death a year later. Businessman, J.P. Bryan purchased The Gage Hotel in 1978 for $30,000. He began renovating and expanding the property in the 1990s.

In 2022 Joe Holley of the Houston Chronicle wrote that Marathon is "proud to be the un-Marfa."

== Geography ==
According to the United States Census Bureau, the CDP has a total area of 5.2 square miles (13 km^{2}), all land.

=== Climate ===
According to the Köppen climate classification system, Marathon has a semiarid climate, BSk on climate maps.

Climate data for Marathon, Texas (Jul 1, 1896–Feb 28, 2013)
Month	Jan	Feb	Mar	Apr	May	Jun	Jul	Aug	Sep	Oct	Nov	Dec	Year
Record high °F (°C)	88 (31)	90 (32)	94 (34)	100 (38)	105 (41)	108 (42)	105 (41)	110 (43)	102 (39)	101 (38)	97 (36)	94 (34)	110 (43)
Mean daily maximum °F (°C)	62.1 (16.7)	65.7 (18.7)	72.9 (22.7)	80.3 (26.8)	86.5 (30.3)	91.1 (32.8)	90.5 (32.5)	90.0 (32.2)	84.9 (29.4)	78.6 (25.9)	69.3 (20.7)	63.0 (17.2)	77.9 (25.5)
Daily mean °F (°C)	45.5 (7.5)	48.6 (9.2)	55.0 (12.8)	62.5 (16.9)	69.8 (21.0)	75.5 (24.2)	76.4 (24.7)	75.6 (24.2)	70.6 (21.4)	62.5 (16.9)	52.4 (11.3)	46.4 (8.0)	61.7 (16.5)
Mean daily minimum °F (°C)	28.8 (−1.8)	31.5 (−0.3)	37.2 (2.9)	44.6 (7.0)	53.1 (11.7)	60.0 (15.6)	62.4 (16.9)	61.3 (16.3)	56.5 (13.6)	46.4 (8.0)	35.5 (1.9)	29.8 (−1.2)	45.6 (7.6)
Record low °F (°C)	−6 (−21)	−3 (−19)	9 (−13)	19 (−7)	32 (0)	40 (4)	49 (9)	43 (6)	35 (2)	17 (−8)	0 (−18)	−3 (−19)	−6 (−21)
Average precipitation inches (mm)	0.44 (11)	0.40 (10)	0.40 (10)	0.74 (19)	1.62 (41)	1.87 (47)	2.21 (56)	2.14 (54)	2.42 (61)	1.40 (36)	0.52 (13)	0.51 (13)	14.69 (373)
Average snowfall inches (cm)	0.6 (1.5)	0.3 (0.76)	0.4 (1.0)	0.0 (0.0)	0.0 (0.0)	0.0 (0.0)	0.0 (0.0)	0.0 (0.0)	0.0 (0.0)	0.0 (0.0)	0.2 (0.51)	0.2 (0.51)	1.6 (4.1)
Average precipitation days (≥ 0.001 in)	2.28	2.14	1.69	2.44	4.28	5.22	5.64	5.63	6.17	3.66	1.96	2.28	46.29
Source: Western Regional Climate Center, Desert Research Institute

== Demographics ==
Historical population
Census	Pop.	Note	%±
2000	455		—
2010	430		−5.5%
2020	410		−4.7%
U.S. Decennial Census; 1850–1900 1910; 1920 1930 1940; 1950 1960 1970; 1980 1990 2000; 2010

Marathon was first listed as a census-designated place in the 2000 U.S. census.

=== 2020 census ===
Marathon CDP, Texas – Racial and ethnic composition Note: the US Census treats Hispanic/Latino as an ethnic category. This table excludes Latinos from the racial categories and assigns them to a separate category. Hispanics/Latinos may be of any race.
Race / Ethnicity (NH = Non-Hispanic)	Pop 2000	Pop 2010	Pop 2020	% 2000	% 2010	% 2020
White alone (NH)	202	239	209	44.40%	55.58%	50.98%
Black or African American alone (NH)	4	0	0	0.88%	0.00%	0.00%
Native American or Alaska Native alone (NH)	0	2	3	0.00%	0.47%	0.73%
Asian alone (NH)	0	0	3	0.00%	0.00%	0.73%
Native Hawaiian or Pacific Islander alone (NH)	0	1	0	0.00%	0.23%	0.00%
Other race alone (NH)	0	0	2	0.00%	0.00%	0.49%
Mixed race or Multiracial (NH)	7	2	3	1.54%	0.47%	0.73%
Hispanic or Latino (any race)	242	186	190	53.19%	43.26%	46.34%
Total	455	430	410	100.00%	100.00%	100.00%

As of the 2020 United States census, there were 410 people, 217 households, and 174 families residing in the CDP.

=== 2000 census ===
As of the census of 2000, there were 455 people, 198 households and 126 families residing in the CDP. The population density was 86.6 inhabitants per square mile (33.4/km^{2}). There were 287 housing units at an average density of 54.6 per square mile (21.1/km^{2}). The racial makeup of the CDP was 82.42% White, 0.88% African American, 13.19% from other races, and 3.52% from two or more races. Hispanic or Latino of any race were 53.19% of the population.

There were 198 households, of which 24.2% had children under the age of 18 living with them, 48.5% were married couples living together, 8.1% had a female householder with no husband present, and 35.9% were non-families. 32.3% of all households were made up of individuals, and 13.1% had someone living alone who was 65 years of age or older. The average household size was 2.30 and the average family size was 2.87.

The age distribution was 21.1% under the age of 18, 9.2% from 18 to 24, 17.1% from 25 to 44, 33.2% from 45 to 64, and 19.3% who were 65 years of age or older. The median age was 46 years. For every 100 females, there were 104.0 males. For every 100 females age 18 and over, there were 108.7 males.

The median household income was $22,273, and the median family income was $27,500. Males had a median income of $22,500 versus $20,938 for females. The per capita income for the CDP was $17,884. About 13.2% of families and 23.2% of the population were below the poverty line, including 46.7% of those under age 18 and 13.9% of those age 65 or over.

== Places of interest ==
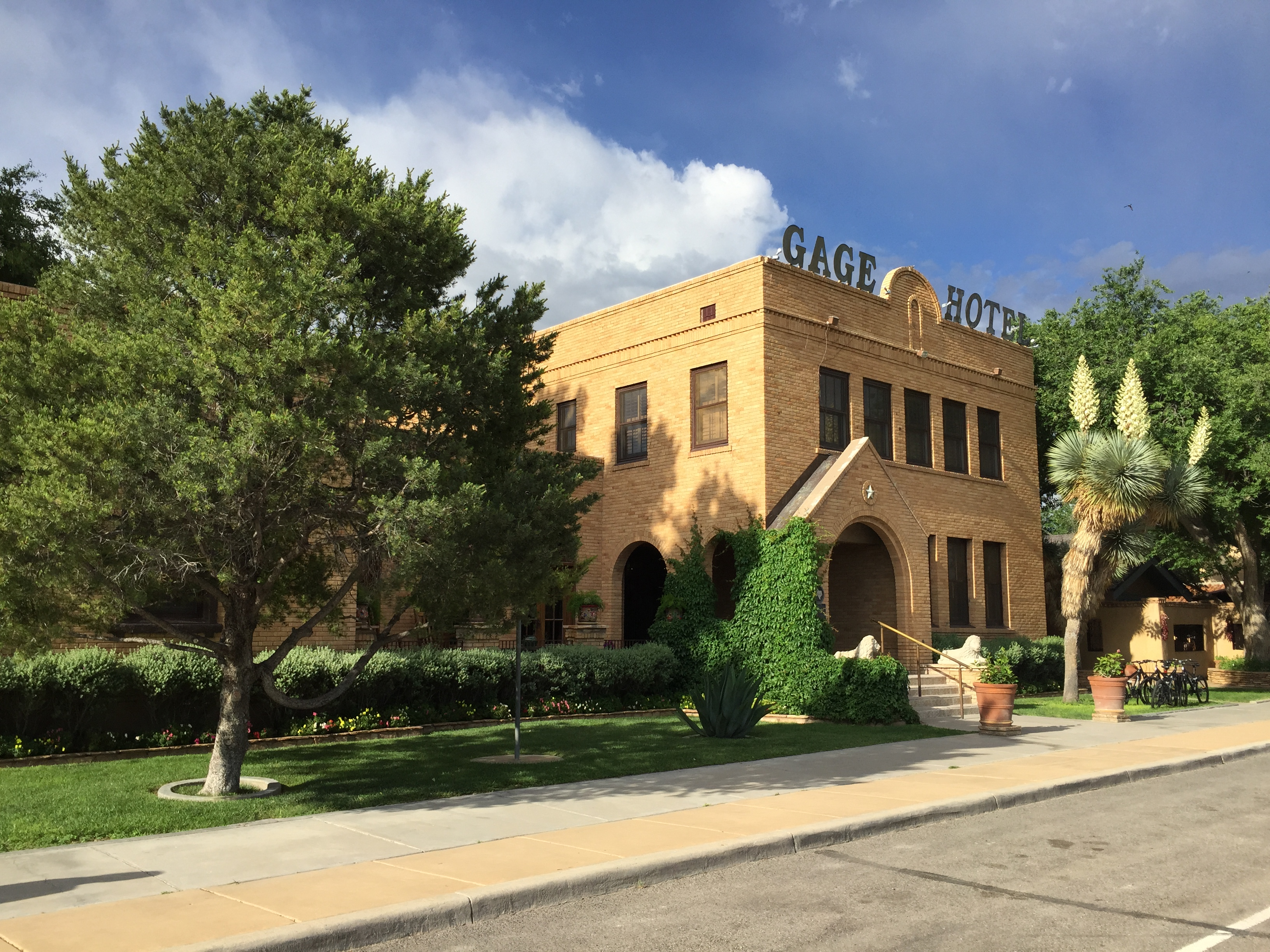
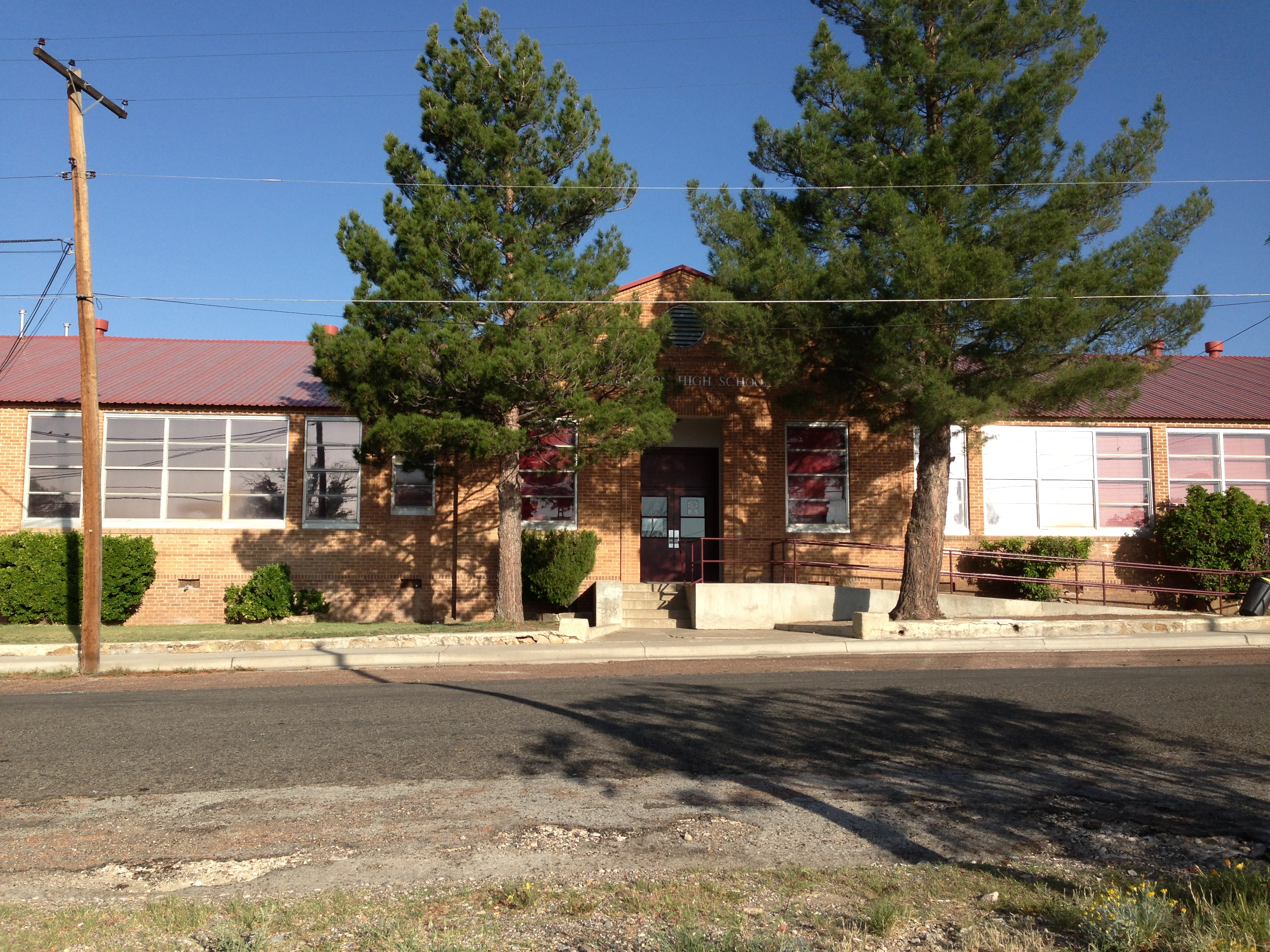
Gage Hotel (left) and Marathon School (right)

J.P. Bryan purchased the vacant Gage Hotel in 1978, which underwent a renovation and re-opened in 1982. The hotel was added to the National Register of Historic Places in 2020. Bryan also acquired other buildings to further develop the town.

The town was also a filming location for the movie Paris, Texas directed by Wim Wenders. The 1985 Kevin Costner film, Fandango, shot scenes in Marathon.

== Transportation ==
Marathon is located at the junction of U.S. Route 90 and U.S. Route 385. US 90 runs east-west through town along 1st St., leading 30 miles (48 km) west to Alpine and 53 miles (85 km) east to Sanderson. US 385 runs north-south, leading 40 miles (64 km) south to the entrance to Big Bend National Park near the Persimmon Gap Visitor Center and 58 miles (93 km) north to Fort Stockton.

Amtrak’s Sunset Limited passes through the town on Union Pacific tracks without stopping, with the nearest station located 30 miles (48 km) northwest in Alpine.

The closest commercial airline service is available at Midland International Air and Space Port (IATA: MAF, ICAO: KMAF, FAA LID: MAF), 154 miles (248 km) to the northeast.

== Education ==
Marathon is served by Marathon Independent School District for grades K-12.

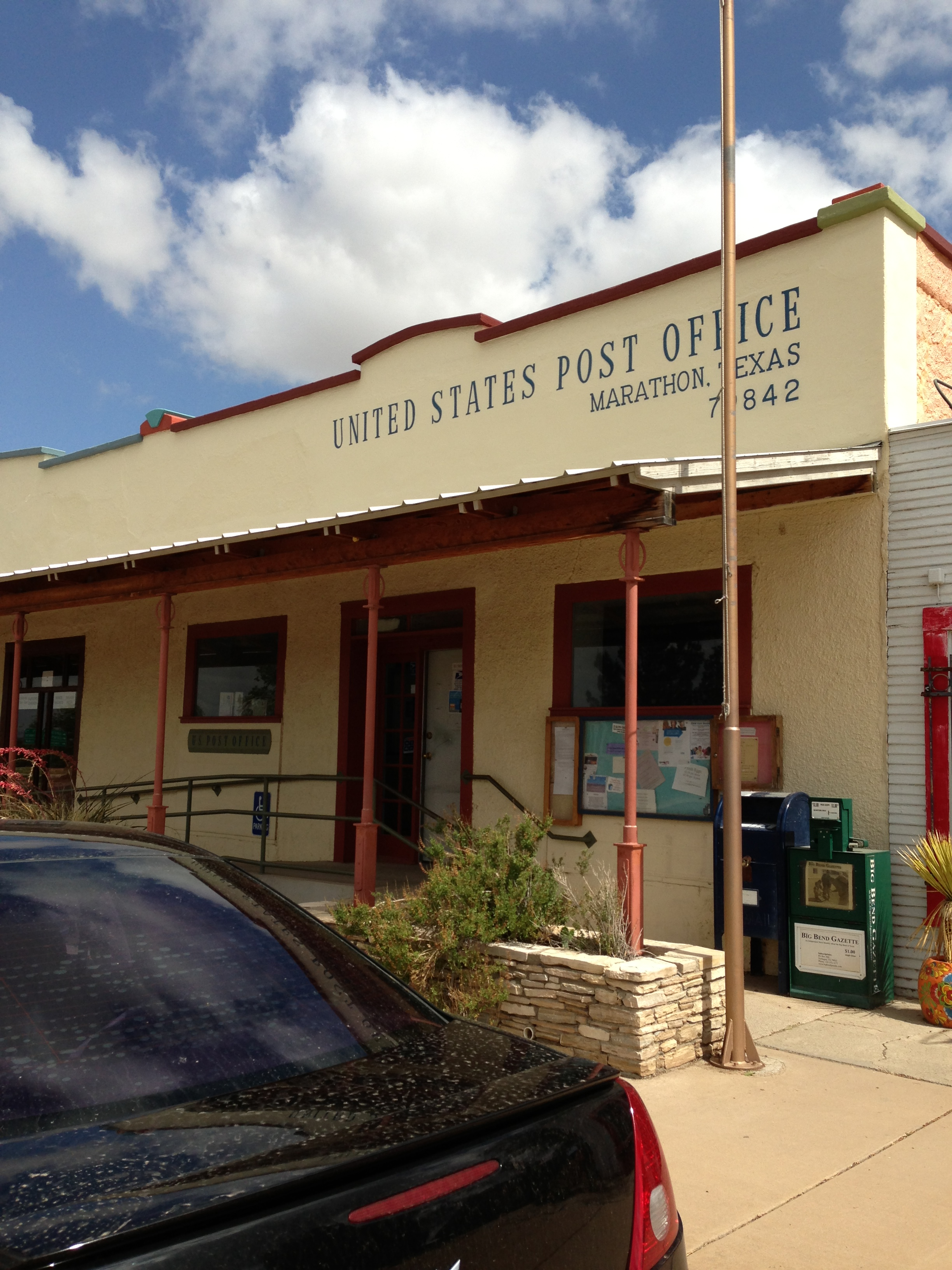
Post office

Brewster County is within the Odessa College District for community college.

== Government and infrastructure ==
Marathon Post Office is operated by the United States Postal Service.

== Earthquake ==
On April 14, 1995, a 5.7-magnitude earthquake occurred near Marathon. As of 2008, this was the second-largest earthquake recorded in Texas.

== See also ==
- Marathon Uplift
