= Brewster County, Texas =

County in Texas, United States

- County
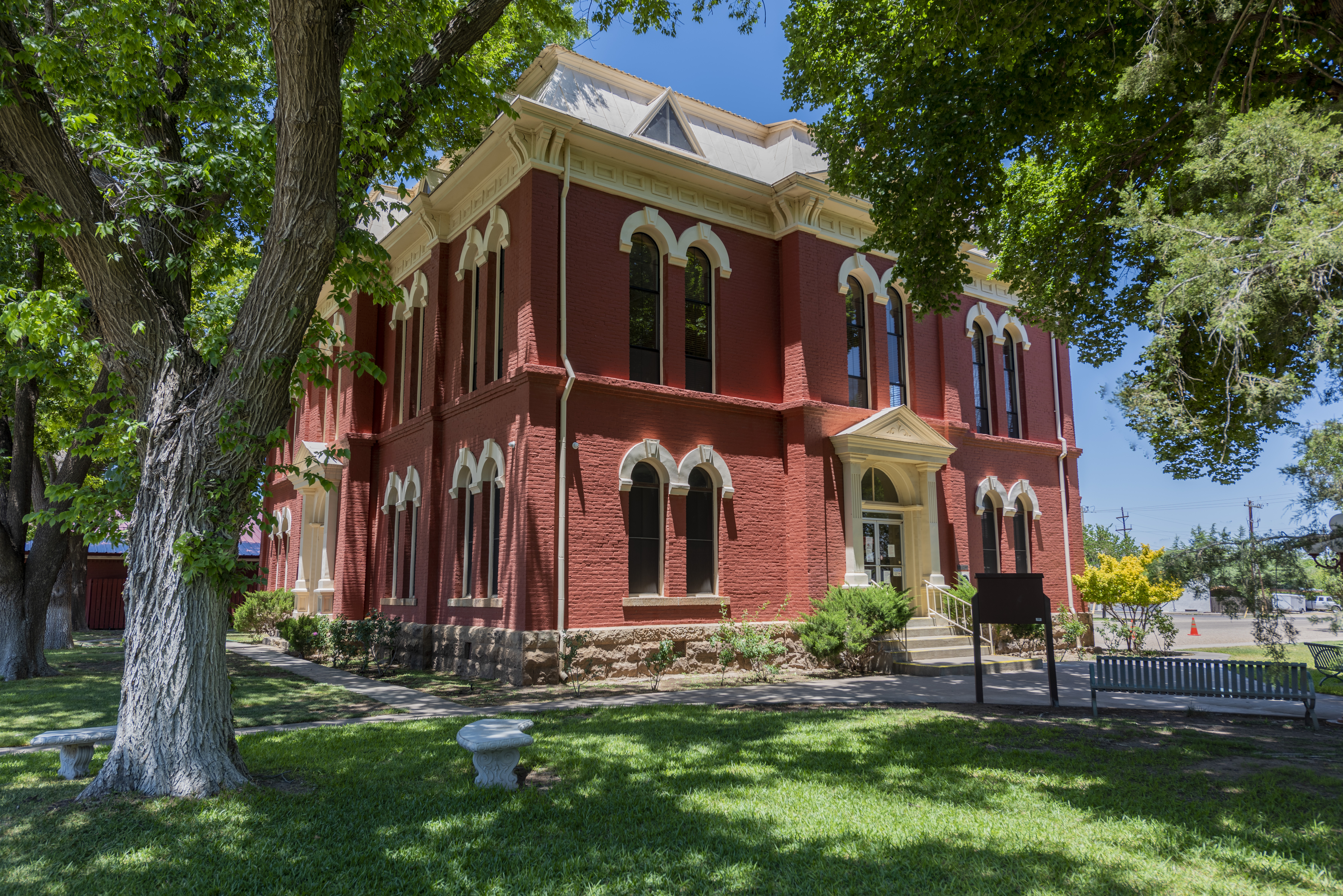
- The Brewster County Courthouse in Alpine

- Location within the U.S. state of Texas
- Coordinates: 29°48′43″N 103°15′06″W
- Country: United States
- State: Texas
- Founded: 1887
- Named for: Henry Percy Brewster
- Seat: Alpine
- Largest city: Alpine

Area
  - Total: 6,192 sq mi (16,040 km^{2})
  - Land: 6,184 sq mi (16,020 km^{2})
  - Water: 8.5 sq mi (22 km^{2}) 0.1%

Population (2020)
  - Total: 9,546
  - Estimate (2025): 9,458 ▼
  - Density: 1.5/sq mi (0.58/km^{2})
- Time zone: UTC−6 (Central)
  - Summer (DST): UTC−5 (CDT)
- Congressional district: 23rd
- Website: www.brewstercounty.gov

Brewster County is a county located in the U.S. state of Texas. It is in West Texas and its county seat (and only city) is Alpine. It is one of the nine counties that comprise the Trans-Pecos region, and borders Mexico. Brewster County is the largest county by area in the state - at 6,192 square miles (16,040 km^{2}) it is over three times the size of the state of Delaware, and more than 500 square miles (1,300 km^{2}) bigger than Connecticut.

As of the 2020 census, the population was 9,546.

The county is named for Colonel Henry Percy Brewster, a Secretary of War for the Republic of Texas.

== History ==
=== Native Americans ===
Paleo-Indian hunter-gatherers existed in the region at least 9000 years ago. Mescalaro Apaches emerged later and conducted raids that discouraged settlers. Between 1779 and 1787, Col. Juan de Ugalde drove the Mescalaros back north across the Rio Grande and into the Chisos Mountains. The three leading Mescalero chiefs, Patula Grande, Quemado, and Zapato Tuerto, agreed in March 1789 to submit to Spanish rule. Comanche raiding parties continued through much of the 19th century.

=== Early explorations ===
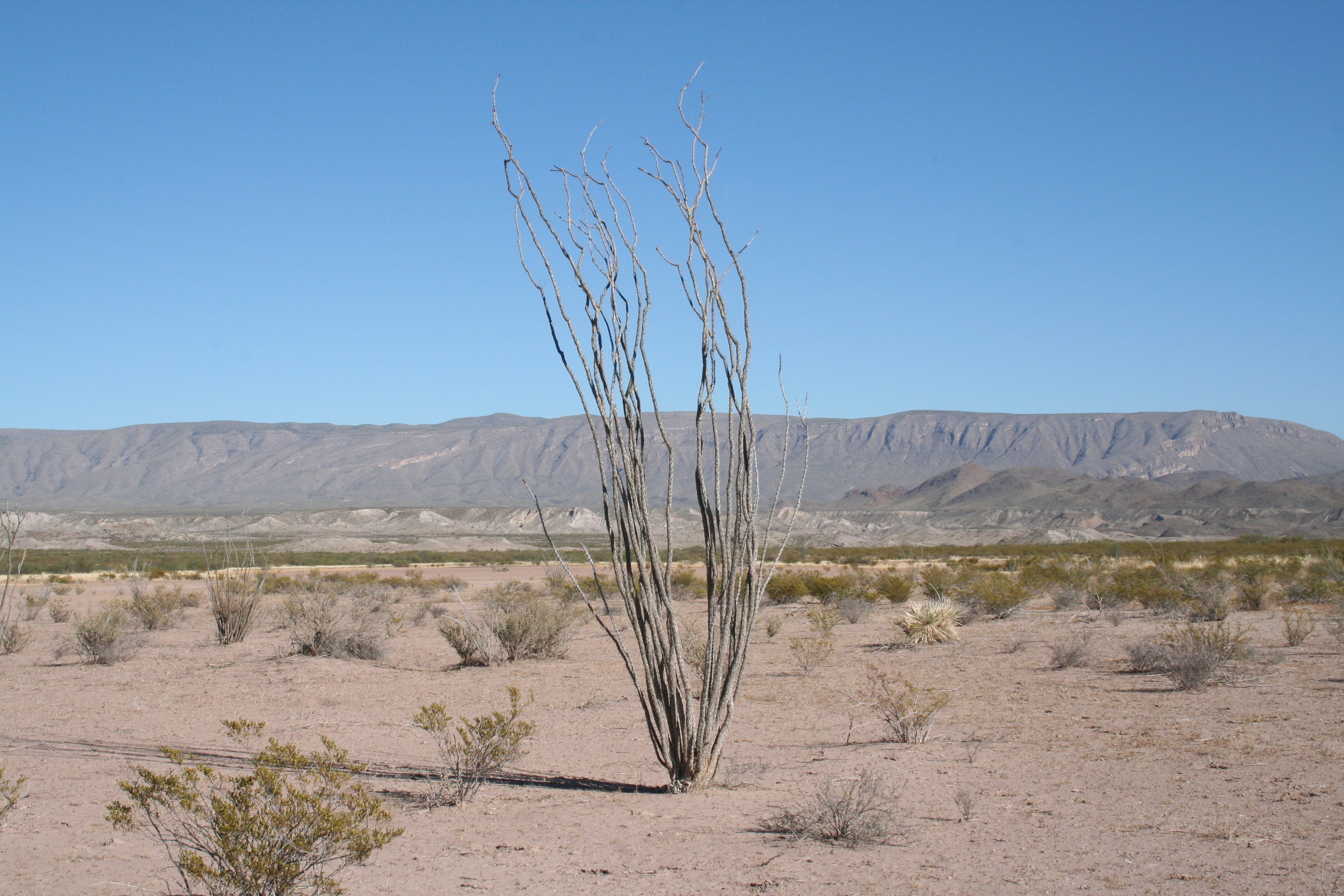
Chihuahuan Desert landscape in Brewster County

Spanish explorers Álvar Núñez Cabeza de Vaca in 1535 and Antonio de Espejo in 1583 crossed Brewster County on their way to La Junta de los Ríos, the junction of the Rio Grande and the Rio Conchos.

In 1684, Juan Domínguez de Mendoza camped at Kokernot Spring and wrote the earliest recorded description of it.

Pedro de Rábago y Terán, Governor of Coahuila in the 1740s, led an expedition to La Junta de los Ríos.

Northern Mexican military governor Lt. Col. Hugo Oconór led a 1772 expedition to locate sites for forts on the Comanche Trail along the Rio Grande.

In October 1851, Danish-born Col. Edvard Emil Langberg, Mexican commandant of Chihuahua, visited southern Brewster County.

Surveyor William H. Emory in 1852 sent M. T. W. Chandler to survey what is now the heart of Big Bend National Park. Chandler explored Santa Elena Canyon, the Chisos Mountains Mariscal Canyon, and Boquillas Canyon.

An 1859 expedition of the U.S. Camel Corps under 2d Lt. Edward L. Hartz explored the Comanche Trail through Persimmon Gap and down Tornillo Creek to the Rio Grande. A year later, a second camel expedition under 2d Lt. William Echols also explored along the Rio Grande.

=== County established and growth ===
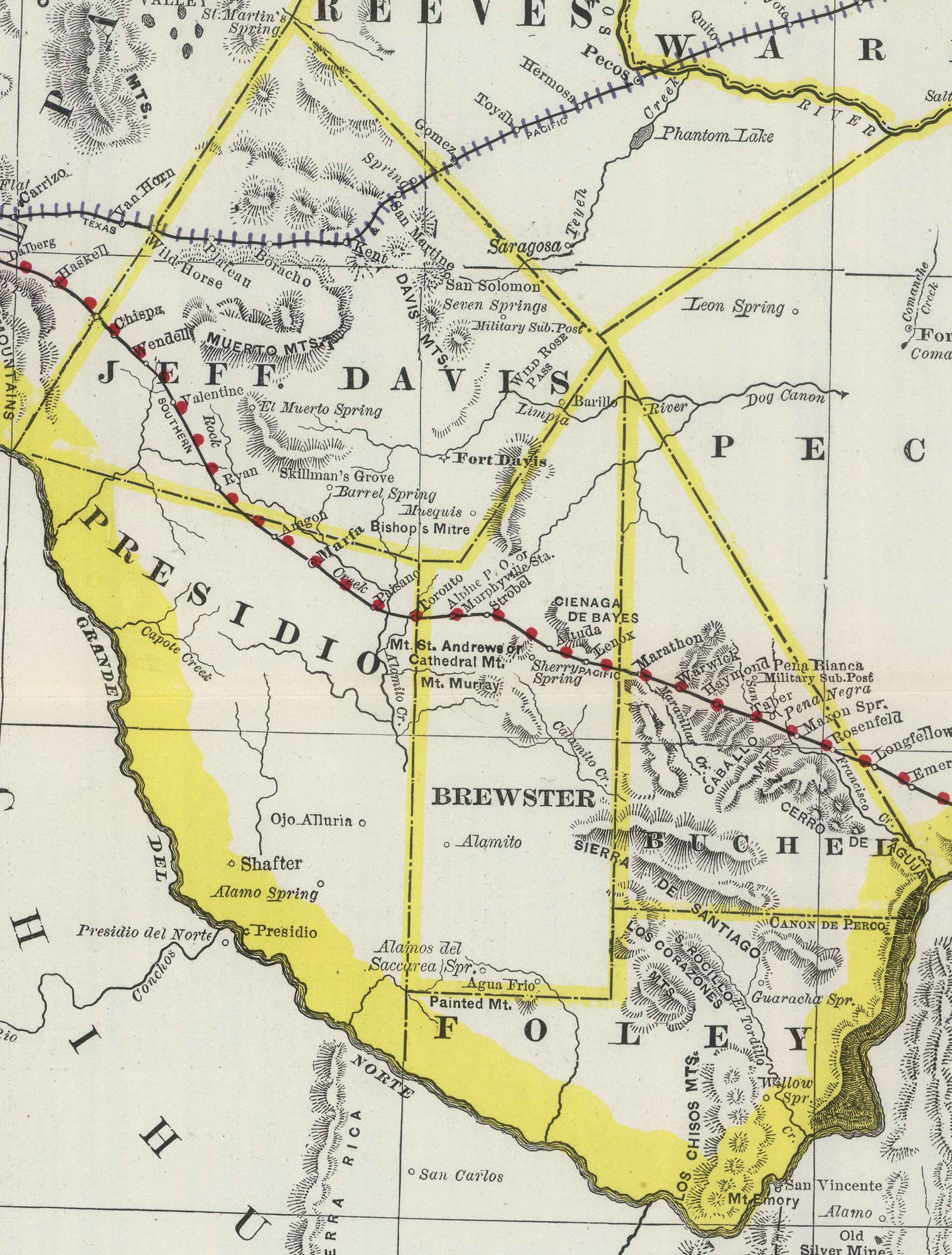
Map of Presidio County, Texas and the counties of Brewster, Buchel, Foley, and Jeff Davis created from Presidio in 1887: Buchel and Foley were abolished and joined to Brewster in 1897.

Brewster County was marked off in 1887 from Presidio County and named for Henry Percy Brewster. Murphyville, later renamed Alpine, was selected as county seat.

In response to threats of ongoing Indian attacks, Camp Peña Colorado was established in 1879 a few miles south of the future site of Marathon.

Word of mouth about the open rangeland in the area was spread by freighters John W Burgess and August Santleben, leading the way for settlers.

The Galveston, Harrisburg and San Antonio Railway built through the area in 1882, opening up opportunity for entrepreneurs who came on railroad-related business and stayed.

Alfred S. Gage moved to the area in 1882 to help his brother's ranching operation, founding the A. S. Gage Ranch, one of the largest ranching operations in Texas, in 1883. In 1927, he built the Gage Hotel in Marathon.

Legendary lawman and later Texas Rangers Hall of Fame member James B. Gillett served as sheriff of Brewster County, and operated a ranch in Alpine in the late 19th and early 20th centuries. He later retired to his Barrel Spring Ranch in Jeff Davis County.

Joseph Daniel Jackson came to the area in 1882 as part of Company B of the Texas Rangers assigned to protect the railroad. By 1882, he had settled near Alpine and taken up ranching, branching out later to become a merchant and civic leader. Jackson is known locally as the father of Sul Ross University due to his efforts that helped lead to the establishment of the school. Sul Ross University, named for Texas Governor Lawrence Sullivan Ross, was created by an act of the 35th Legislature in 1917 as a state normal college to train teachers.

=== Population boom ===
The population grew from 710 in 1890 to 5,220 in 1910 due for the most part to industries that relied on natural resources.

From the turn of the 20th century through World War II, the Terlingua Mining District, west of the Chisos Mountains, was a boom town due to the extraction of cinnabar, a mercury ore. Silver and lead from mines on the Mexican side of the river in the Boquillas area were shipped north, as were candelilla wax produced at factories at Glenn Spring and Mariscal, and the guayule rubber from a factory in Marathon.

=== Pancho Villa and banditos ===
Brewster County became targeted by incursions of bandits from Mexico, inspired at least in part by Pancho Villa. In June 1915, Governor James E. Ferguson asked President Woodrow Wilson to station troops in the Big Bend. The request was denied by Maj. Gen. Frederick Funston, who believed such security was a state issue. Although a number of events took place to effect policy change, the tipping point was the May 5, 1916, raid at Glenn Spring. Only nine soldiers had been stationed in the area for protection against the bandits. Estimates vary as to the number of Mexican raiders who attacked the soldiers, from 60 to several hundred. The raid caused a larger military presence in the area. President Wilson mobilized the National Guard to reinforce the Army, and by the end of 1916, an estimated 116,957 guardsmen were stationed along the border from California to Texas. As the mines and wax factories played out after World War I, raids from across the border abated.

=== Big Bend ===
The geographic region known as the Big Bend is a loosely defined section of the Trans-Pecos, although generally agreed to comprise its more southern portions. Characterized by an extremely rugged, arid Chihuahuan Desert landscape, the region takes its name from the sharp northeastward turn made by the Rio Grande nearby. Often noted for its stark beauty, the Big Bend was described by the historian Walter Prescott Webb as "the finest example of earth-wreckage in Texas". It was for this reason that a national park was to be established in the region.

Big Bend National Park was established as a state park in 1933 by the state legislature, and expanded the same year by Governor Miriam A. Ferguson. In 1935, the United States Congress passed legislation founding it as a national park. Big Bend opened to the public in 1944. At just over 800,000 acres, it is the fourteenth largest national park in the United States and is larger than the state of Rhode Island.

Big Bend Ranch State Park (located partially in Presidio County) opened to the public in 1991; at 300,000 acres (1,200 km^{2}), it is the largest state park in Texas.

=== Terlingua Chili Cookoffs ===
Terlingua produced 40% of the nation's quicksilver in 1920, but declining population has since qualified it as a ghost town. In 1962, The Dallas Morning News columnist Francis X. Tolbert published his ode to chili Bowl of Red and founded the Chili Appreciation Society. Fellow columnist Wick Fowler joined in the fun and became a charter member. The World Championship Chili Cookoff at Terlingua began as a tongue-in-cheek challenge between Fowler and humorist H. Allen Smith in 1967 and has become a November tradition, celebrated across the state and nation. On the first Saturday in November Terlingua now hosts two competing international chili championships: the Terlingua International Chili Championship, and the Original Terlingua International Chili Cookoff.

== Geography ==
According to the U.S. Census Bureau, the county has a total area of 6,192 square miles (16,040 km^{2}), of which 6,184 square miles (16,020 km^{2}) are land and 8.5 square miles (22 km^{2}) (0.1%) are covered by water. It is the largest county in Texas by area. The only substantial water is half the width of the Rio Grande.

The county's area is larger than the combined area of Delaware and Rhode Island, and larger than area of the individual states Connecticut, Delaware, and Rhode Island.

The Roadian Age of the Permian Period of geological time is named for rock strata in Road Canyon in the northern part of the county.

The Wordian Age of the Permian Period is probably named for the Word Ranch in the Glass Mountains, also in the northern part.

=== Adjacent counties and municipalities ===
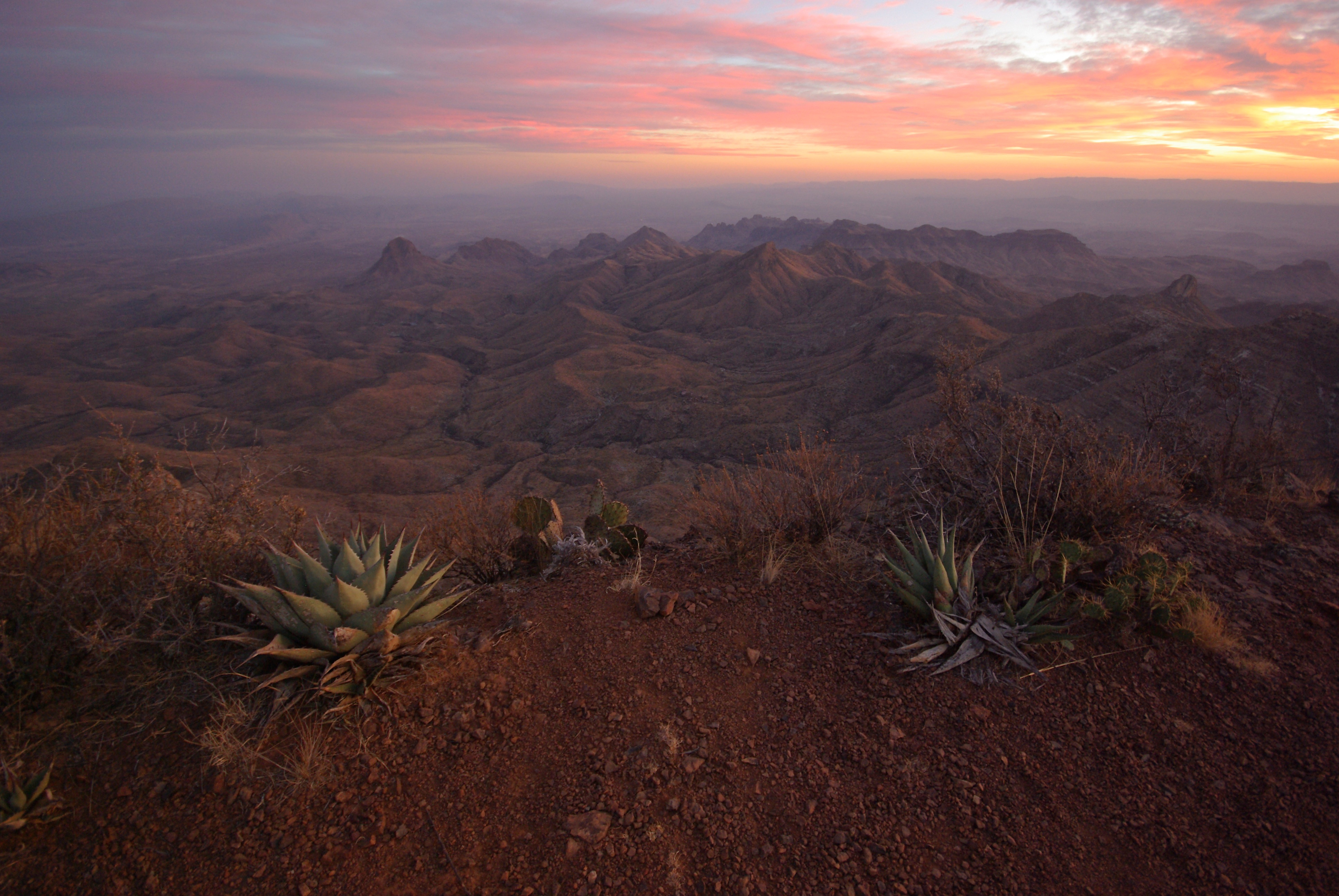
Sunset in Big Bend National Park

- Pecos County (north)
- Terrell County (east)
- Acuña, Coahuila, Mexico (southeast and south)
- Ocampo, Coahuila, Mexico (south)
- Manuel Benavides, Chihuahua, Mexico (southwest)
- Presidio County (west)
- Jeff Davis County (northwest)

=== National protected areas ===
- Big Bend National Park
- Rio Grande Wild and Scenic River (part)

=== Major highways ===
- U.S. Highway 67
- U.S. Highway 90
- U.S. Highway 385
- State Highway 118
- State Highway 223

U.S. Highway 90 crosses the county in the north; U.S. Highway 385 enters Brewster County from the northeast and proceeds south to the county's main attraction, Big Bend National Park, part of the Big Bend. The Sunset Route of the Union Pacific Railroad crosses northern parts of the county, and a recently revived portion of the Kansas City, Mexico and Orient Railway traverses the county en route to Presidio.

== Climate ==
About 39.4% of Brewster County is classified as having a hot arid desert climate (Köppen BWh). The remainder has a semiarid steppe climate with 32.1% experiencing a cold steppe climate (Köppen BSk), while 28.5% is assigned as a hot steppe climate (Köppen BSh). Temperatures are coolest and rainfall most abundant in the county's northern highlands and in the upper elevations of the Chisos Mountains in the south. In the southern lowlands along the Rio Grande, snowfall is uncommon, rainfall much reduced, and summer high temperatures can be extreme. Throughout the county, precipitation falls mostly from May through October with the remainder of the year predominantly dry.

Alpine

- Coordinates: 30.37639°N 103.66000°W
- Elevation: 4,475 feet (1,364 m)

Climate data for Alpine, Texas (March 1, 1900–March 31, 2013)
Month	Jan	Feb	Mar	Apr	May	Jun	Jul	Aug	Sep	Oct	Nov	Dec	Year
Mean daily maximum °F (°C)	60.5 (15.8)	64.5 (18.1)	70.9 (21.6)	78.7 (25.9)	85.4 (29.7)	90.8 (32.7)	89.4 (31.9)	88.5 (31.4)	83.8 (28.8)	77.8 (25.4)	67.8 (19.9)	61.5 (16.4)	76.6 (24.8)
Mean daily minimum °F (°C)	32.7 (0.4)	35.2 (1.8)	40.1 (4.5)	47.5 (8.6)	55.5 (13.1)	62.7 (17.1)	64.0 (17.8)	63.1 (17.3)	58.0 (14.4)	49.5 (9.7)	39.3 (4.1)	33.9 (1.1)	48.5 (9.2)
Average precipitation inches (mm)	0.53 (13)	0.48 (12)	0.36 (9.1)	0.50 (13)	1.24 (31)	2.30 (58)	2.75 (70)	2.65 (67)	2.57 (65)	1.30 (33)	0.51 (13)	0.60 (15)	15.79 (399.1)
Source: Western Regional Climate Center, Desert Research Institute

Castolon

- Coordinates: 29.13444°N 103.51500°W
- Elevation: 2,169 feet (661 m)

Climate data for Castolon, Texas (February 1, 1947–March 31, 2013)
Month	Jan	Feb	Mar	Apr	May	Jun	Jul	Aug	Sep	Oct	Nov	Dec	Year
Mean daily maximum °F (°C)	68.3 (20.2)	74.4 (23.6)	82.9 (28.3)	91.9 (33.3)	99.8 (37.7)	103.4 (39.7)	102.2 (39.0)	101.1 (38.4)	96.3 (35.7)	88.5 (31.4)	77.7 (25.4)	68.4 (20.2)	87.9 (31.1)
Mean daily minimum °F (°C)	34.5 (1.4)	39.5 (4.2)	47.1 (8.4)	56.2 (13.4)	66.2 (19.0)	73.1 (22.8)	74.4 (23.6)	73.5 (23.1)	68.6 (20.3)	57.7 (14.3)	44.2 (6.8)	35.4 (1.9)	55.9 (13.3)
Average precipitation inches (mm)	0.37 (9.4)	0.29 (7.4)	0.23 (5.8)	0.41 (10)	0.96 (24)	1.45 (37)	1.71 (43)	1.62 (41)	1.47 (37)	1.06 (27)	0.36 (9.1)	0.30 (7.6)	10.23 (258.3)
Source: Western Regional Climate Center, Desert Research Institute

Chisos Basin

- Coordinates: 29.27028°N 103.30028°W
- Elevation: 5,300 feet (1,615 m)

Climate data for Chisos Basin, Texas (August 1, 1943–March 31, 2013)
Month	Jan	Feb	Mar	Apr	May	Jun	Jul	Aug	Sep	Oct	Nov	Dec	Year
Mean daily maximum °F (°C)	58.3 (14.6)	61.8 (16.6)	68.7 (20.4)	76.3 (24.6)	82.8 (28.2)	86.8 (30.4)	84.8 (29.3)	83.7 (28.7)	79.5 (26.4)	73.8 (23.2)	65.2 (18.4)	59.4 (15.2)	73.4 (23.0)
Mean daily minimum °F (°C)	36.9 (2.7)	39.1 (3.9)	44.1 (6.7)	51.5 (10.8)	58.5 (14.7)	63.3 (17.4)	63.7 (17.6)	62.7 (17.1)	58.6 (14.8)	51.9 (11.1)	43.2 (6.2)	37.9 (3.3)	50.9 (10.5)
Average precipitation inches (mm)	0.68 (17)	0.58 (15)	0.41 (10)	0.62 (16)	1.59 (40)	2.21 (56)	3.39 (86)	3.12 (79)	2.48 (63)	1.51 (38)	0.57 (14)	0.51 (13)	17.67 (447)
Source: Western Regional Climate Center, Desert Research Institute

Lajitas

- Coordinates: 29.26944°N 103.75750°W
- Elevation: 2,403 feet (732 m)

Climate data for Lajitas, Texas (March 1, 1978–March 31, 2013)
Month	Jan	Feb	Mar	Apr	May	Jun	Jul	Aug	Sep	Oct	Nov	Dec	Year
Mean daily maximum °F (°C)	68.8 (20.4)	75.0 (23.9)	83.1 (28.4)	91.2 (32.9)	97.8 (36.6)	102.2 (39.0)	100.5 (38.1)	99.1 (37.3)	95.1 (35.1)	87.8 (31.0)	77.4 (25.2)	69.2 (20.7)	87.3 (30.7)
Mean daily minimum °F (°C)	34.6 (1.4)	39.1 (3.9)	45.8 (7.7)	54.3 (12.4)	63.8 (17.7)	73.0 (22.8)	74.1 (23.4)	72.9 (22.7)	67.6 (19.8)	56.3 (13.5)	43.6 (6.4)	35.2 (1.8)	55.0 (12.8)
Average precipitation inches (mm)	0.33 (8.4)	0.27 (6.9)	0.23 (5.8)	0.34 (8.6)	0.95 (24)	1.47 (37)	2.16 (55)	1.32 (34)	1.57 (40)	1.29 (33)	0.30 (7.6)	0.24 (6.1)	10.47 (266.4)
Source: Western Regional Climate Center, Desert Research Institute

Marathon

- Coordinates: 30.19250°N 103.27167°W
- Elevation: 3,989 feet (1,216 m)

Climate data for Marathon, Texas (July 1, 1896–February 28, 2013)
Month	Jan	Feb	Mar	Apr	May	Jun	Jul	Aug	Sep	Oct	Nov	Dec	Year
Mean daily maximum °F (°C)	62.1 (16.7)	65.7 (18.7)	72.9 (22.7)	80.3 (26.8)	86.5 (30.3)	91.1 (32.8)	90.5 (32.5)	90.0 (32.2)	84.9 (29.4)	78.6 (25.9)	69.3 (20.7)	63.0 (17.2)	77.9 (25.5)
Mean daily minimum °F (°C)	28.8 (−1.8)	31.5 (−0.3)	37.2 (2.9)	44.6 (7.0)	53.1 (11.7)	60.0 (15.6)	62.4 (16.9)	61.3 (16.3)	56.5 (13.6)	46.4 (8.0)	35.5 (1.9)	29.8 (−1.2)	45.6 (7.6)
Average precipitation inches (mm)	0.44 (11)	0.40 (10)	0.40 (10)	0.74 (19)	1.62 (41)	1.87 (47)	2.21 (56)	2.14 (54)	2.42 (61)	1.40 (36)	0.52 (13)	0.51 (13)	14.67 (371)
Source: Western Regional Climate Center, Desert Research Institute

Panther Junction

- Coordinates: 29.32722°N 103.20611°W
- Elevation: 3,740 feet (1,140 m)

Climate data for Panther Junction, Texas (April 1, 1955–March 31, 2013)
Month	Jan	Feb	Mar	Apr	May	Jun	Jul	Aug	Sep	Oct	Nov	Dec	Year
Mean daily maximum °F (°C)	61.6 (16.4)	66.4 (19.1)	74.5 (23.6)	83.2 (28.4)	89.9 (32.2)	94.3 (34.6)	92.9 (33.8)	91.7 (33.2)	86.9 (30.5)	79.8 (26.6)	70.0 (21.1)	62.6 (17.0)	79.5 (26.4)
Mean daily minimum °F (°C)	36.0 (2.2)	39.2 (4.0)	45.6 (7.6)	53.5 (11.9)	61.4 (16.3)	67.2 (19.6)	68.8 (20.4)	67.8 (19.9)	62.4 (16.9)	53.9 (12.2)	44.1 (6.7)	37.4 (3.0)	53.1 (11.7)
Average precipitation inches (mm)	0.48 (12)	0.50 (13)	0.33 (8.4)	0.54 (14)	1.37 (35)	1.64 (42)	2.13 (54)	1.99 (51)	1.82 (46)	1.42 (36)	0.56 (14)	0.43 (11)	13.21 (336.4)
Source: Western Regional Climate Center, Desert Research Institute

Persimmon Gap

- Coordinates: 29.66028°N 103.17361°W
- Elevation: 2,865 feet (873 m)

Climate data for Persimmon Gap, Texas (May 2, 1952–March 31, 2013)
Month	Jan	Feb	Mar	Apr	May	Jun	Jul	Aug	Sep	Oct	Nov	Dec	Year
Mean daily maximum °F (°C)	64.5 (18.1)	69.2 (20.7)	77.5 (25.3)	86.3 (30.2)	93.7 (34.3)	97.7 (36.5)	96.4 (35.8)	95.7 (35.4)	90.4 (32.4)	83.3 (28.5)	73.0 (22.8)	64.0 (17.8)	82.6 (28.2)
Mean daily minimum °F (°C)	33.8 (1.0)	37.3 (2.9)	44.7 (7.1)	53.4 (11.9)	62.8 (17.1)	70.5 (21.4)	72.1 (22.3)	71.6 (22.0)	65.3 (18.5)	54.3 (12.4)	42.0 (5.6)	34.3 (1.3)	53.5 (12.0)
Average precipitation inches (mm)	0.40 (10)	0.37 (9.4)	0.34 (8.6)	0.43 (11)	1.02 (26)	1.36 (35)	1.65 (42)	1.60 (41)	1.71 (43)	0.94 (24)	0.50 (13)	0.34 (8.6)	10.66 (271.6)
Source: Western Regional Climate Center, Desert Research Institute

Study Butte

- Coordinates: 29.32861°N 103.55306°W
- Elevation: 2,563 feet (781 m)

Climate data for Study Butte, Texas (May 1, 1993–June 30, 2006)
Month	Jan	Feb	Mar	Apr	May	Jun	Jul	Aug	Sep	Oct	Nov	Dec	Year
Mean daily maximum °F (°C)	69.2 (20.7)	73.2 (22.9)	81.0 (27.2)	88.9 (31.6)	98.2 (36.8)	100.6 (38.1)	99.6 (37.6)	98.2 (36.8)	94.7 (34.8)	86.3 (30.2)	75.7 (24.3)	66.3 (19.1)	86.0 (30.0)
Mean daily minimum °F (°C)	36.5 (2.5)	41.5 (5.3)	47.3 (8.5)	55.2 (12.9)	66.3 (19.1)	72.9 (22.7)	73.8 (23.2)	73.0 (22.8)	67.9 (19.9)	57.2 (14.0)	45.9 (7.7)	36.5 (2.5)	56.2 (13.4)
Average precipitation inches (mm)	0.26 (6.6)	0.17 (4.3)	0.37 (9.4)	0.33 (8.4)	0.63 (16)	1.32 (34)	1.86 (47)	1.77 (45)	0.61 (15)	1.09 (28)	0.47 (12)	0.26 (6.6)	9.14 (232.3)
Source: Western Regional Climate Center, Desert Research Institute

Terlingua Ranch

- Coordinates: 29.47444°N 103.40611°W
- Elevation: 3,682 feet (1,122 m)

Climate data for Terlingua Ranch, Texas (May 1, 1993–March 31, 2013)
Month	Jan	Feb	Mar	Apr	May	Jun	Jul	Aug	Sep	Oct	Nov	Dec	Year
Mean daily maximum °F (°C)	63.5 (17.5)	66.9 (19.4)	74.2 (23.4)	82.8 (28.2)	91.2 (32.9)	95.0 (35.0)	93.8 (34.3)	93.2 (34.0)	88.5 (31.4)	80.3 (26.8)	71.0 (21.7)	62.4 (16.9)	80.2 (26.8)
Mean daily minimum °F (°C)	34.8 (1.6)	37.9 (3.3)	43.7 (6.5)	51.5 (10.8)	61.0 (16.1)	66.9 (19.4)	68.0 (20.0)	67.3 (19.6)	61.9 (16.6)	52.6 (11.4)	42.5 (5.8)	35.3 (1.8)	51.9 (11.1)
Average precipitation inches (mm)	0.36 (9.1)	0.38 (9.7)	0.42 (11)	0.48 (12)	0.98 (25)	1.46 (37)	2.28 (58)	1.27 (32)	1.27 (32)	1.04 (26)	0.44 (11)	0.20 (5.1)	10.58 (267.9)
Source: Western Regional Climate Center, Desert Research Institute

== Demographics ==
Historical population
Census	Pop.	Note	%±
1890	710		—
1900	2,356		231.8%
1910	5,220		121.6%
1920	4,822		−7.6%
1930	6,624		37.4%
1940	6,478		−2.2%
1950	7,309		12.8%
1960	6,434		−12.0%
1970	7,780		20.9%
1980	7,573		−2.7%
1990	8,681		14.6%
2000	8,866		2.1%
2010	9,232		4.1%
2020	9,546		3.4%
2025 (est.)	9,458	▼	−0.9%
U.S. Decennial Census; 1850–2010 2010–2020

=== Racial and ethnic composition ===
Brewster County, Texas – Racial and ethnic composition Note: the US Census treats Hispanic/Latino as an ethnic category. This table excludes Latinos from the racial categories and assigns them to a separate category. Hispanics/Latinos may be of any race.
Race / Ethnicity (NH = Non-Hispanic)	Pop 1980	Pop 1990	Pop 2000	Pop 2010	Pop 2020	% 1980	% 1990	% 2000	% 2010	% 2020
White alone (NH)	4,171	4,833	4,710	5,011	4,948	55.08%	55.67%	53.12%	54.28%	51.83%
Black or African American alone (NH)	57	77	87	79	162	0.75%	0.89%	0.98%	0.86%	1.70%
Native American or Alaska Native alone (NH)	20	17	63	38	30	0.26%	0.20%	0.71%	0.41%	0.31%
Asian alone (NH)	34	48	27	58	94	0.45%	0.55%	0.30%	0.63%	0.98%
Native Hawaiian or Pacific Islander alone (NH)	x	x	2	5	11	x	x	0.02%	0.05%	0.12%
Other race alone (NH)	29	4	10	11	56	0.38%	0.05%	0.11%	0.12%	0.59%
Mixed race or Multiracial (NH)	x	x	100	112	282	x	x	1.13%	1.21%	2.95%
Hispanic or Latino (any race)	3,262	3,702	3,867	3,918	3,963	43.07%	42.64%	43.62%	42.44%	41.51%
Total	7,573	8,681	8,866	9,232	9,546	100.00%	100.00%	100.00%	100.00%	100.00%

=== 2020 census ===
As of the 2020 census, the county had a population of 9,546 residents and 2,300 families residing in the county.

The median age was 42.5 years. 17.8% of residents were under the age of 18 and 22.3% of residents were 65 years of age or older. For every 100 females there were 104.7 males, and for every 100 females age 18 and over there were 104.0 males age 18 and over.

The racial makeup of the county was 67.2% White, 2.1% Black or African American, 1.5% American Indian and Alaska Native, 1.0% Asian, 0.1% Native Hawaiian and Pacific Islander, 8.3% from some other race, and 19.9% from two or more races. Hispanic or Latino residents of any race comprised 41.5% of the population.

65.8% of residents lived in urban areas, while 34.2% lived in rural areas.

There were 4,230 households in the county, of which 23.2% had children under the age of 18 living in them. Of all households, 40.4% were married-couple households, 26.1% were households with a male householder and no spouse or partner present, and 27.4% were households with a female householder and no spouse or partner present. About 38.7% of all households were made up of individuals and 15.8% had someone living alone who was 65 years of age or older.

There were 5,930 housing units, of which 28.7% were vacant. Among occupied housing units, 62.4% were owner-occupied and 37.6% were renter-occupied. The homeowner vacancy rate was 2.5% and the rental vacancy rate was 14.1%.

=== 2010 census ===
As of the 2010 United States census, 9,232 people resided in the county; 86.6% were White, 1.1% Black or African American, 1.1% Native American, 0.7% Asian, 0.1% Pacific Islander, 7.6% of some other race and 2.8% of two or more races. About 42.4% were Hispanic or Latino (of any race).

== Education ==
Map of Brewster County, Texas with school district boundaries

These school districts serve Brewster County:

- Alpine Independent School District (Alpine High School)
- Marathon Independent School District
- San Vicente Independent School District (K-8 only) (high schoolers attend Terlingua CSD)
- Terlingua Common School District (Big Bend High School)

In addition, Sul Ross State University is located in Alpine.

Brewster County is within the Odessa College District for community college.

== Communities ==
=== City ===
- Alpine (county seat)

=== Census-designated places ===
- Marathon
- Study Butte
- Terlingua

=== Unincorporated communities ===
- Altuda
- Arick Village
- Boquillas
- Lajitas
- Panther Junction
- Rosenfeld
- Tesnus

=== Ghost towns ===
- Castolon
- Glenn Springs
- Haymond
- Hovey
- McKinney Springs
- San Vicente
- Toronto

=== County Sheriff's Office ===
- Alpine is the headquarters of the Brewster County Sheriff's Office. The current elected Sheriff is Ronny Dodson. The County Sheriff's Office conducts patrols and criminal investigations across the county including the incorporated City of Alpine.

== Media ==
In 1985, there was a daily subscription of, in the county: 483 for the San Angelo Standard Times, 1.1% of its total circulation; and 270 for the Odessa American, making up 0.7% of its total circulation.

In 1985, KVLF-AM, in Alpine, was the only radio station licensed in Brewster County. An individual quoted in a Federal Communications Report stated that in daylight hours it was possible to get radio from Fort Stockton, Texas.

== Politics ==
Brewster County is Republican leaning in presidential elections and has generally remained so despite its high Hispanic population and relatively large state university, though not as strongly Republican as other rural counties in the Trans-Pecos region or West Texas. The last non-Republican candidate to win the county was Barack Obama in 2008. In recent years, Brewster County has shifted to the right, although at a slower rate than other West Texas counties, in 2024 giving Republicans their best results since 1984.

United States presidential election results for Brewster County, Texas
Year	Republican		Democratic		Third party(ies)	
Year	No.	%	No.	%	No.	%
1912	30	7.39%	333	82.02%	43	10.59%
1916	43	16.67%	207	80.23%	8	3.10%
1920	125	36.02%	210	60.52%	12	3.46%
1924	113	22.60%	366	73.20%	21	4.20%
1928	406	59.36%	273	39.91%	5	0.73%
1932	130	12.87%	875	86.63%	5	0.50%
1936	151	15.39%	828	84.40%	2	0.20%
1940	245	19.63%	1,001	80.21%	2	0.16%
1944	237	19.98%	864	72.85%	85	7.17%
1948	312	23.27%	940	70.10%	89	6.64%
1952	1,096	64.28%	609	35.72%	0	0.00%
1956	837	63.22%	479	36.18%	8	0.60%
1960	736	50.51%	716	49.14%	5	0.34%
1964	635	33.65%	1,251	66.30%	1	0.05%
1968	790	37.78%	958	45.82%	343	16.40%
1972	1,524	62.31%	904	36.96%	18	0.74%
1976	1,368	52.13%	1,227	46.76%	29	1.11%
1980	1,496	51.73%	1,271	43.95%	125	4.32%
1984	2,066	58.28%	1,462	41.24%	17	0.48%
1988	1,708	51.55%	1,569	47.36%	36	1.09%
1992	1,127	34.71%	1,383	42.59%	737	22.70%
1996	1,438	41.66%	1,643	47.60%	371	10.75%
2000	1,867	52.15%	1,349	37.68%	364	10.17%
2004	1,980	52.66%	1,729	45.98%	51	1.36%
2008	1,855	47.56%	1,970	50.51%	75	1.92%
2012	1,976	51.10%	1,765	45.64%	126	3.26%
2016	2,077	48.85%	1,873	44.05%	302	7.10%
2020	2,461	51.04%	2,258	46.83%	103	2.14%
2024	2,545	55.59%	1,969	43.01%	64	1.40%

United States Senate election results for Brewster County, Texas1
Year	Republican		Democratic		Third party(ies)	
Year	No.	%	No.	%	No.	%
2024	2,422	53.30%	1,998	43.97%	124	2.73%

United States Senate election results for Brewster County, Texas2
Year	Republican		Democratic		Third party(ies)	
Year	No.	%	No.	%	No.	%
2020	2,453	51.40%	2,167	45.41%	152	3.19%
2026	1,633	42.88%	2,063	54.18%	112	2.94%

Texas Gubernatorial election results for Brewster County
Year	Republican		Democratic		Third party(ies)	
Year	No.	%	No.	%	No.	%
2022	2,014	53.52%	1,678	44.59%	71	1.89%
2026	1,710	44.76%	2,017	52.80%	93	2.43%

== In literature ==
Brewster County appears in the poem by Campbell McGrath, "Sunset, Route 90, Brewster County, Texas," featured in his book American Noise.

== See also ==
- Chalk Mountains
- List of museums in West Texas
- National Register of Historic Places listings in Brewster County, Texas
- Recorded Texas Historic Landmarks in Brewster County
- USS Brewster County (LST-483)
- Buchel County, Texas
- Foley County, Texas
- Post Park
