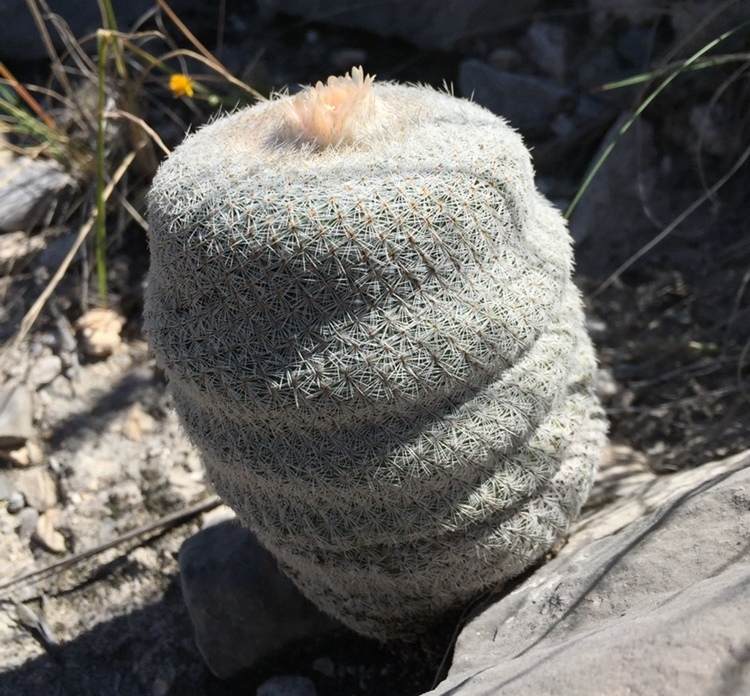

Scientific classification
- Kingdom: Plantae
- Clade: Embryophytes
- Clade: Tracheophytes
- Clade: Spermatophytes
- Clade: Angiosperms
- Clade: Eudicots
- Order: Caryophyllales
- Family: Cactaceae
- Subfamily: Cactoideae
- Genus: Epithelantha
- Species: E. cryptica

Binomial name
- Epithelantha cryptica D.Donati & Zanov., 2011

= Epithelantha cryptica =

Species of cactus

Epithelantha cryptica is a species of Epithelantha found in Mexico.

== Description ==
Epithelantha cryptica is a small cactus that usually grows alone but can sometimes branch out and form small clusters over time. It has a rounded or slightly cylindrical, sturdy stem measuring 1.5 to 3 cm in diameter. When the plant becomes desiccated or loses turgidity, sunken rings appear on its surface. It develops a strong taproot that anchors it securely in rocky soils and helps it absorb moisture from deeper layers. The stem surface is covered with closely spaced tubercles, giving the plant a compact appearance. Each tubercle has a woolly areole from which short, fine, white-to-light-gray spines emerge, forming a dense covering that protects against intense sunlight and reduces water loss. The top of the plant is usually hidden beneath a mass of white hairs, which shield young tissues during growth. Flowers are small about 1 cm across, funnel-shaped, and appear at the top of the stem. They range in color from white to pale pink. The fruits are elongated, bright red, and contain small black seeds. They ripen quickly and split open at the base, aiding seed dispersal by wind or animals.

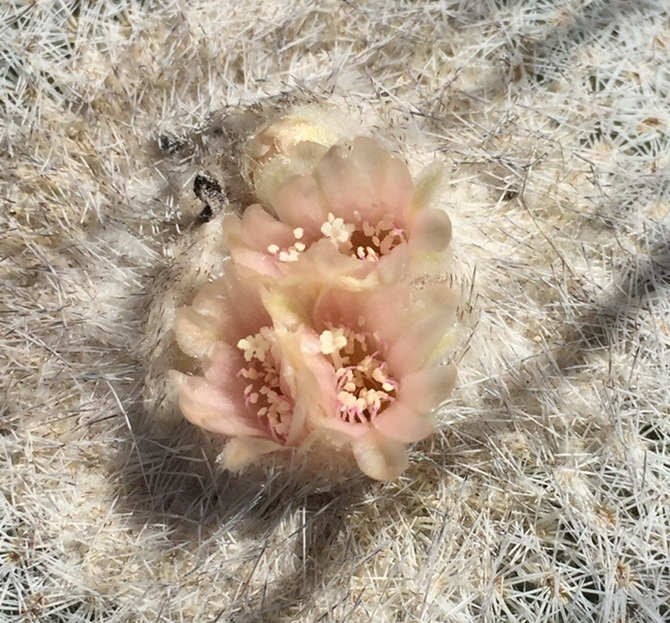
Flowers closeup

== Distribution ==
This species is endemic to the state of Coahuila, northeastern Mexico. Its natural habitat includes deserts and dry scrublands, sloping hills with stony, gravelly soils mixed with a small amount of organic material growing in crevices of hills and rocky ridges where drainage is good and competition is minimal. Plants are found growing along with Epithelantha greggii , Echinocereus pectinatus, Echinocereus enneacanthus, Pelecyphora macromeris, Sclerocactus scheeri, and Sclerocactus mariposensis

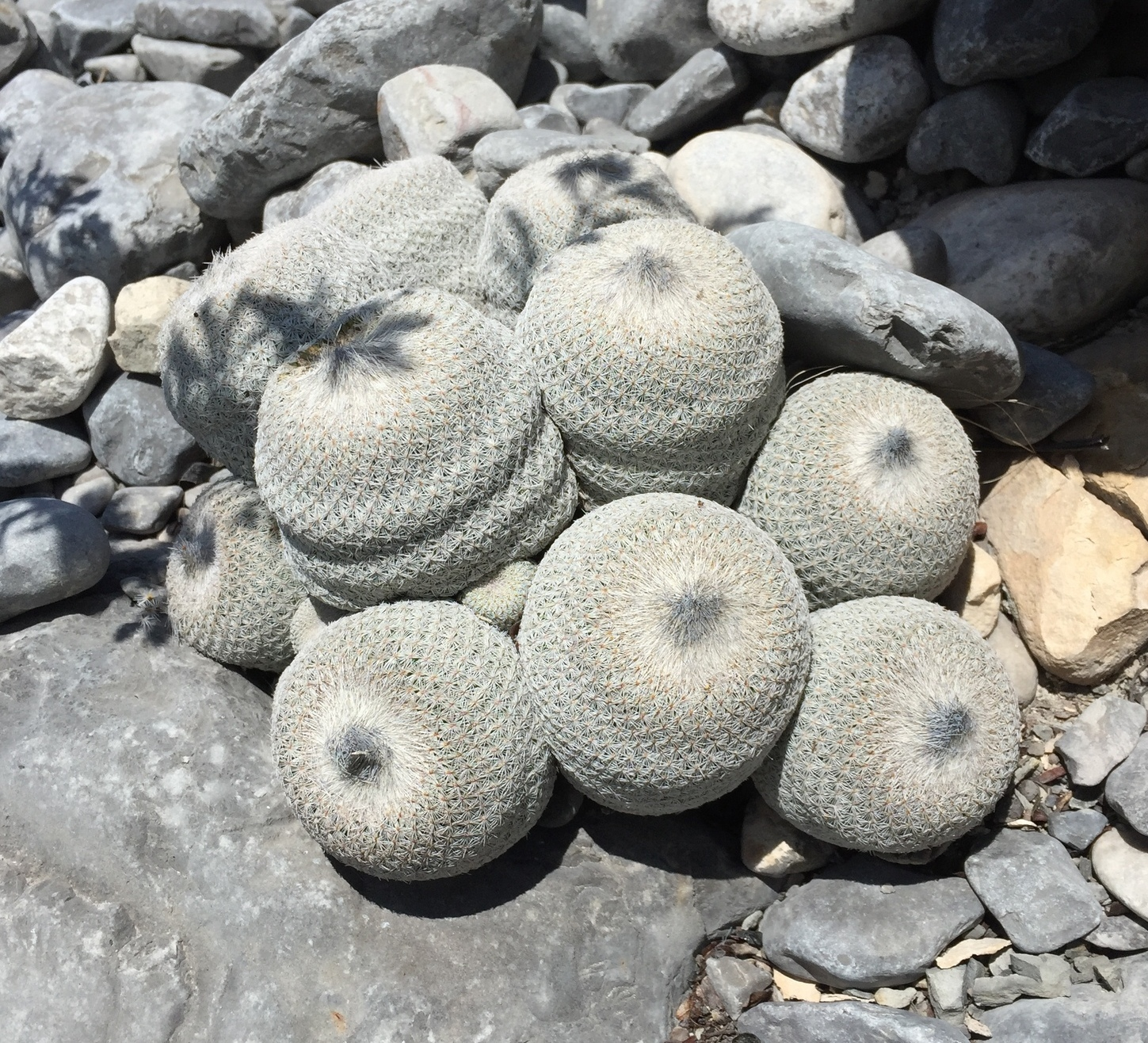
Plants growing in Castaños Municipality, Coahuila, Mexico

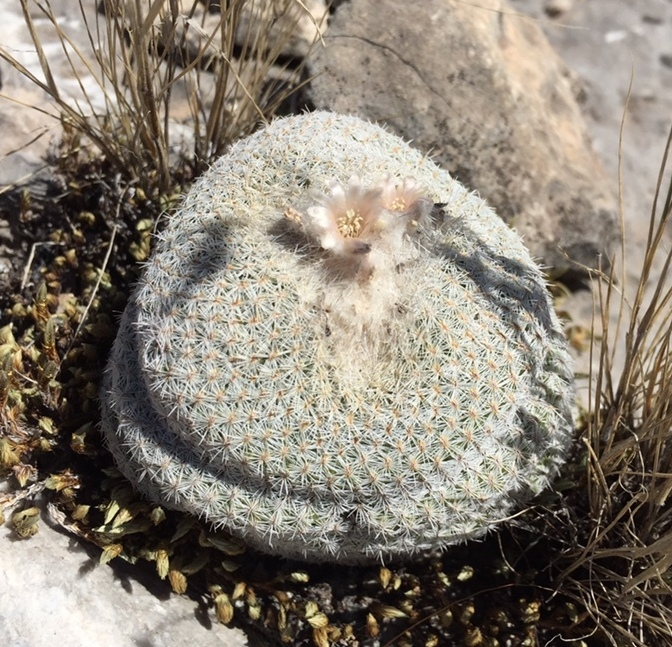
Blooming plant growing in La Coma, Coahuila, Mexico

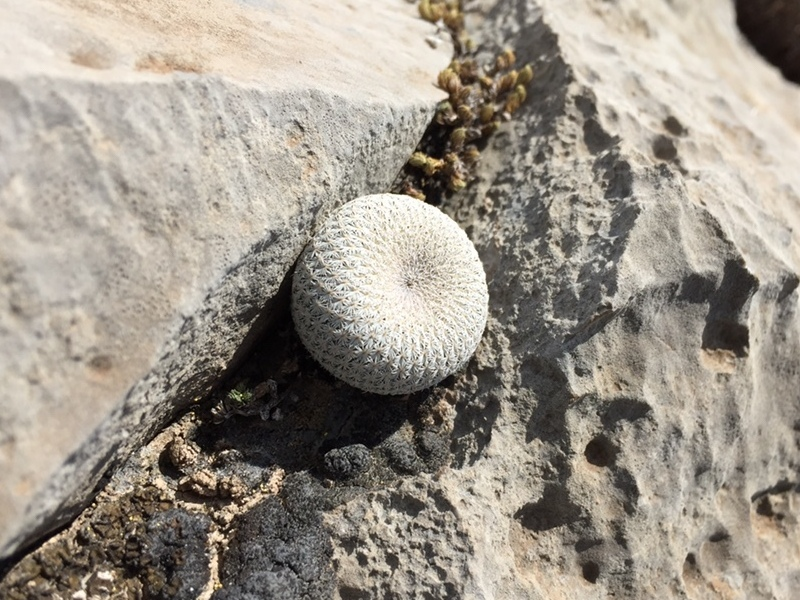
Plant growing in San Lorenzo, Coahuila, Mexico

== Taxonomy ==
Epithelantha cryptica was described by botanists Davide Donati and Carlo Zanovello in 2011, in their book Epithelantha. The name "cryptica" comes from the Greek kryptos, meaning "hidden," likely referring to the plant's inconspicuous, semi-buried nature.
