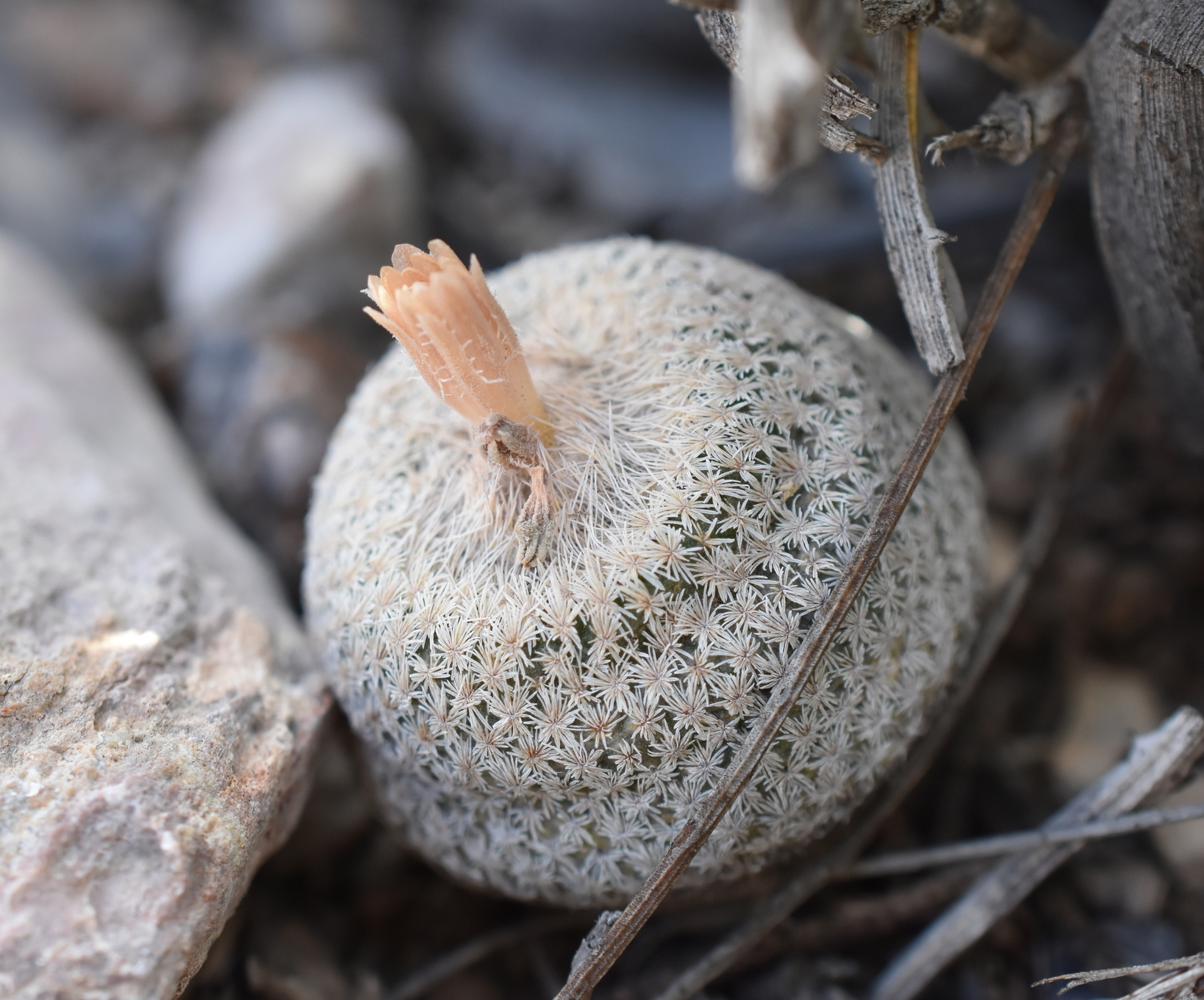

Conservation status
- Least Concern (IUCN 3.1)

Scientific classification
- Kingdom: Plantae
- Clade: Embryophytes
- Clade: Tracheophytes
- Clade: Spermatophytes
- Clade: Angiosperms
- Clade: Eudicots
- Order: Caryophyllales
- Family: Cactaceae
- Subfamily: Cactoideae
- Genus: Epithelantha
- Species: E. bokei

Binomial name
- Epithelantha bokei L.D.Benson 1969

Synonyms
- Epithelantha micromeris var. bokei (L.D.Benson) Glass & R.A.Foster 1978; Epithelantha micromeris subsp. bokei (L.D.Benson) U.Guzmán 2003

= Epithelantha bokei =

Species of cactus

Epithelantha bokei is a species of cactus known by the common names pingpong ball cactus and button-cactus.

== Description ==
Epithelantha bokei is a small, disc-shaped or cylindrical cactus that usually measures 2 to 5 centimeters in width. It is typically unbranched, with a flat or slightly concave top. Most of the plant remains below ground, with only a few centimeters visible above the surface. During dry periods, it contracts into the soil for protection. The stems are thickly covered in dense, pale-colored spines, giving the plant a white or yellowish appearance. The spines are short, with the longest reaching about 7 mm. Each areole can bear up to 90 spines, which lie flat against the stem and form dense clusters. The plant almost always grows solitary, with small, smooth, glossy stems. When dried out or losing turgor, sunken rings may appear on the surface. Young plants look very similar to mature ones, making early identification challenging. The flowers are delicate, pale pink to silvery white, protruding above the spines at the stem apex. They measure 1 to 1.7 cm long and wide, with 13 to 21 translucent inner tepals marked by pink, pinkish-tan, or greenish-yellow lines, and 8 to 13 outer tepals with scalloped edges. The flowers contain 20 to 40 stamens and white stigma lobes. They bloom mainly in late spring and early summer, opening on warm days for one or two days. The fruits are cylindrical, red, and about 1 cm long, although they may stay green if environmental conditions are unfavorable. They are bare, measuring 0.8 to 1.3 cm long and 1.5 to 4.3 mm thick. Seeds are black, glossy, and 1 to 1.4 mm long, shaped like a comma or helmet with a deep cavity near the hilum. Fruits develop in late summer and fall.

Epithelantha bokei is often confused with Epithelantha micromeris, but it is more common in areas where both occur. The two species are distinguishable in the field, even from a distance. Epithelantha bokei is a small, ground-hugging cactus with a flat-topped, disc or cylindrical form, densely covered in pale spines, with delicate pink or silvery white flowers, and red fruits. It contracts into the soil during dry conditions and can be recognized by its dense, pale spines and flat-topped stems.

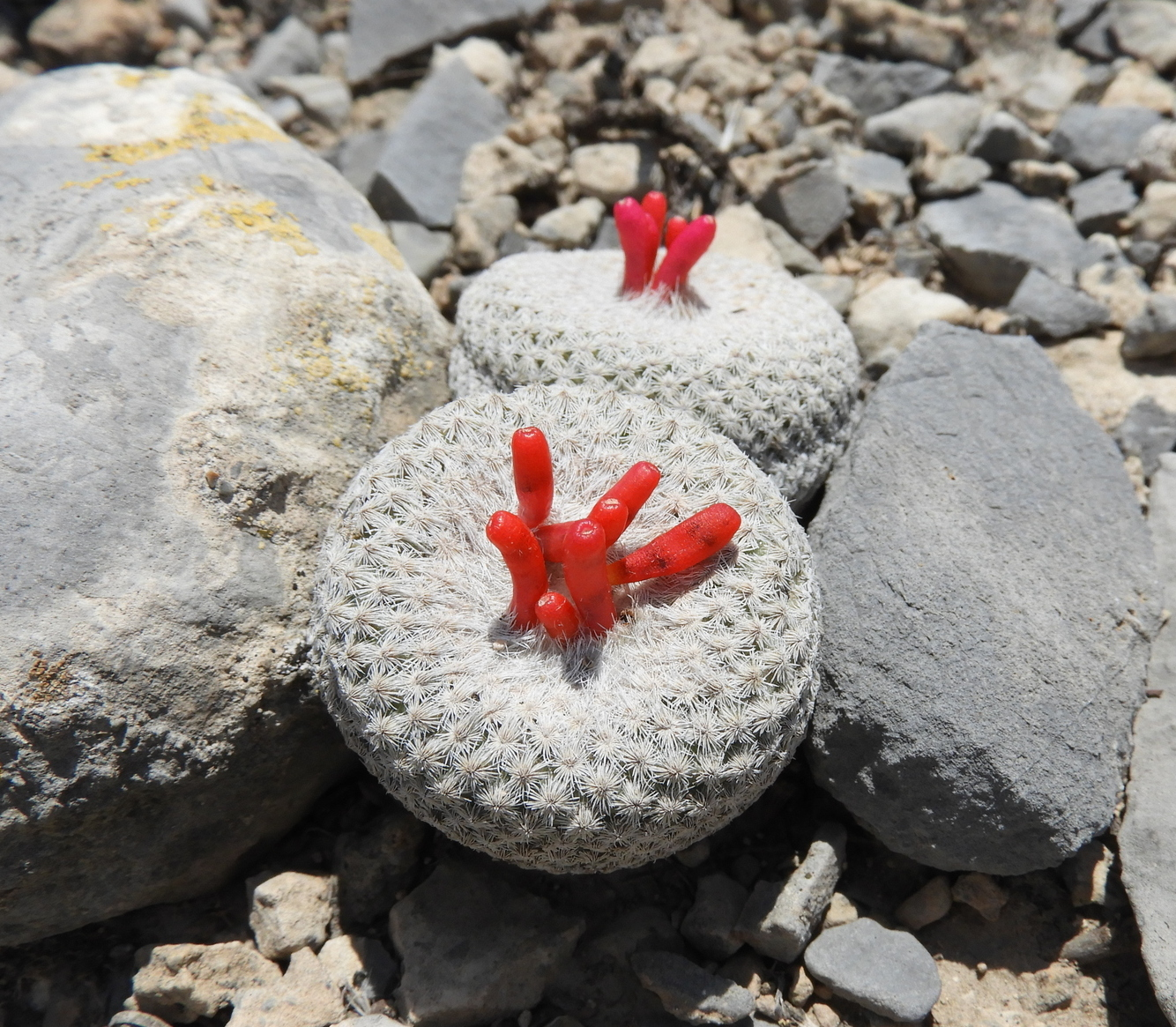
Plant fruiting

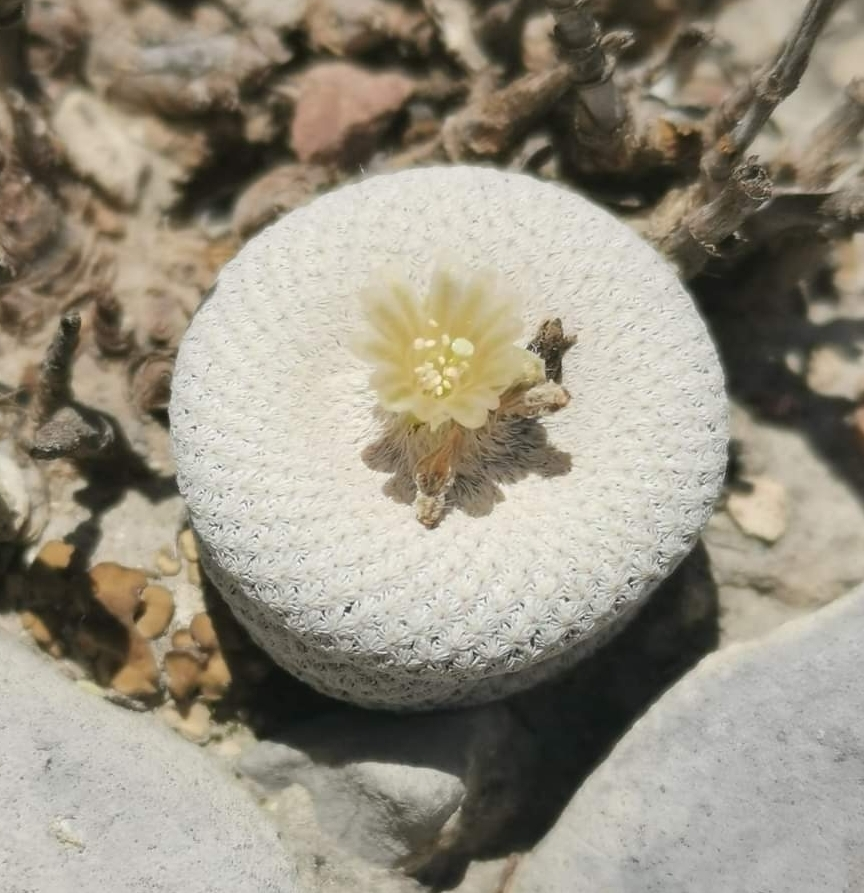
Flower

== Distribution ==
The species' native range extends from Texas in the United States to northeastern Mexico, specifically within the states of Coahuila and Chihuahua in desert or dry scrubland environments at elevations between 700 and 1,500 meters above sea level. The species is a soil specialist, often forming dense clusters on specific calcareous substrates. It is commonly found on elevated limestone hills, mountain summits, and rocky ledges within xerophytic scrublands. Additionally, the species can occur on plains, where it grows on soils composed of gravel mixed with organic-rich earth resulting from leaf decomposition. These conditions provide localized nutrients and enable the species to thrive in extremely dry environments. Plants are found growing along with Coryphantha difficilis, Ariocarpus fissuratus, Echinocereus pectinatus, Sclerocactus scheeri, Mammillaria heyderi. Threats to the species include poaching and habitat degradation. It is in cultivation at the Desert Botanical Garden in Phoenix, Arizona.

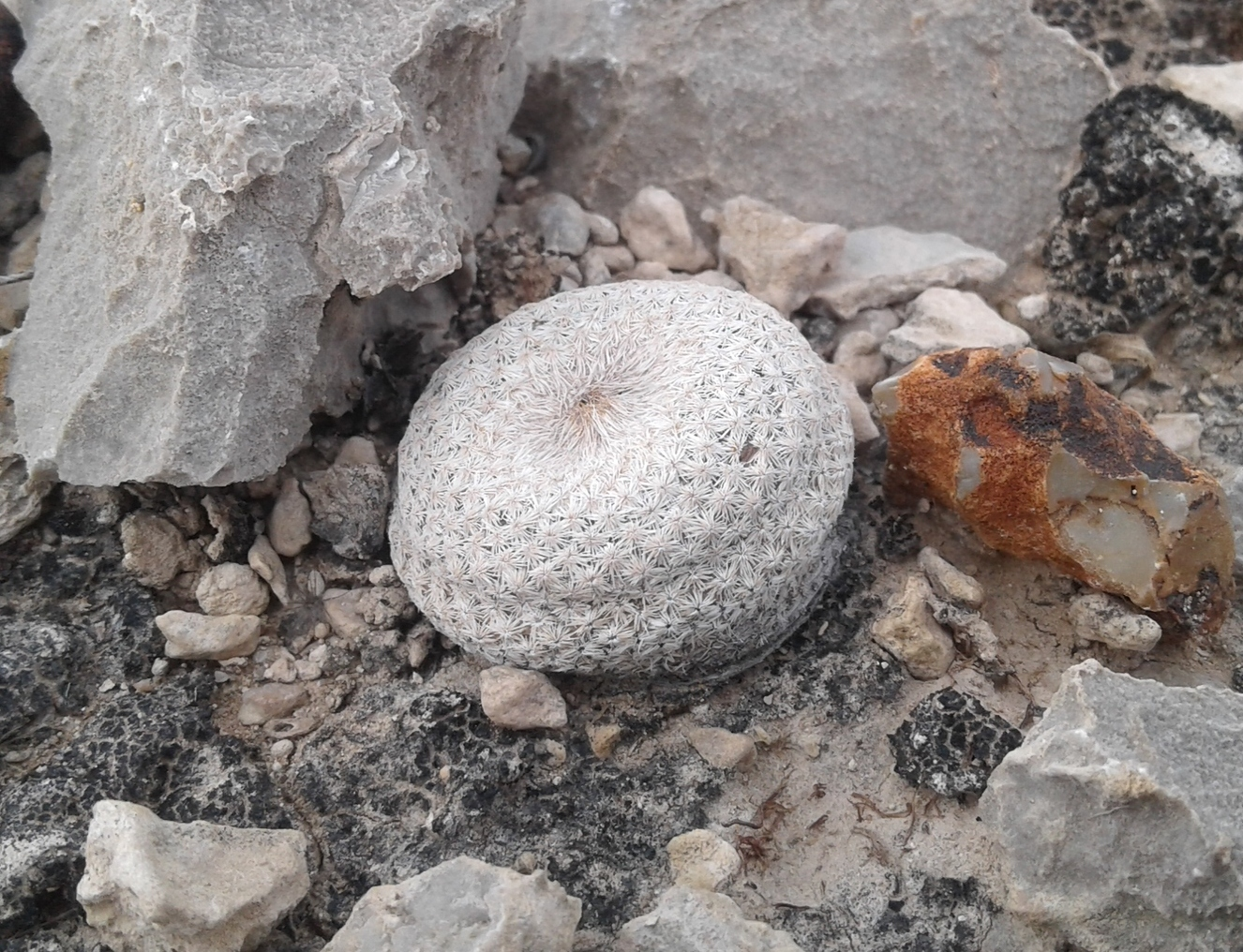
Plant growing in Las Ánimas, Chihuahua, Mexico

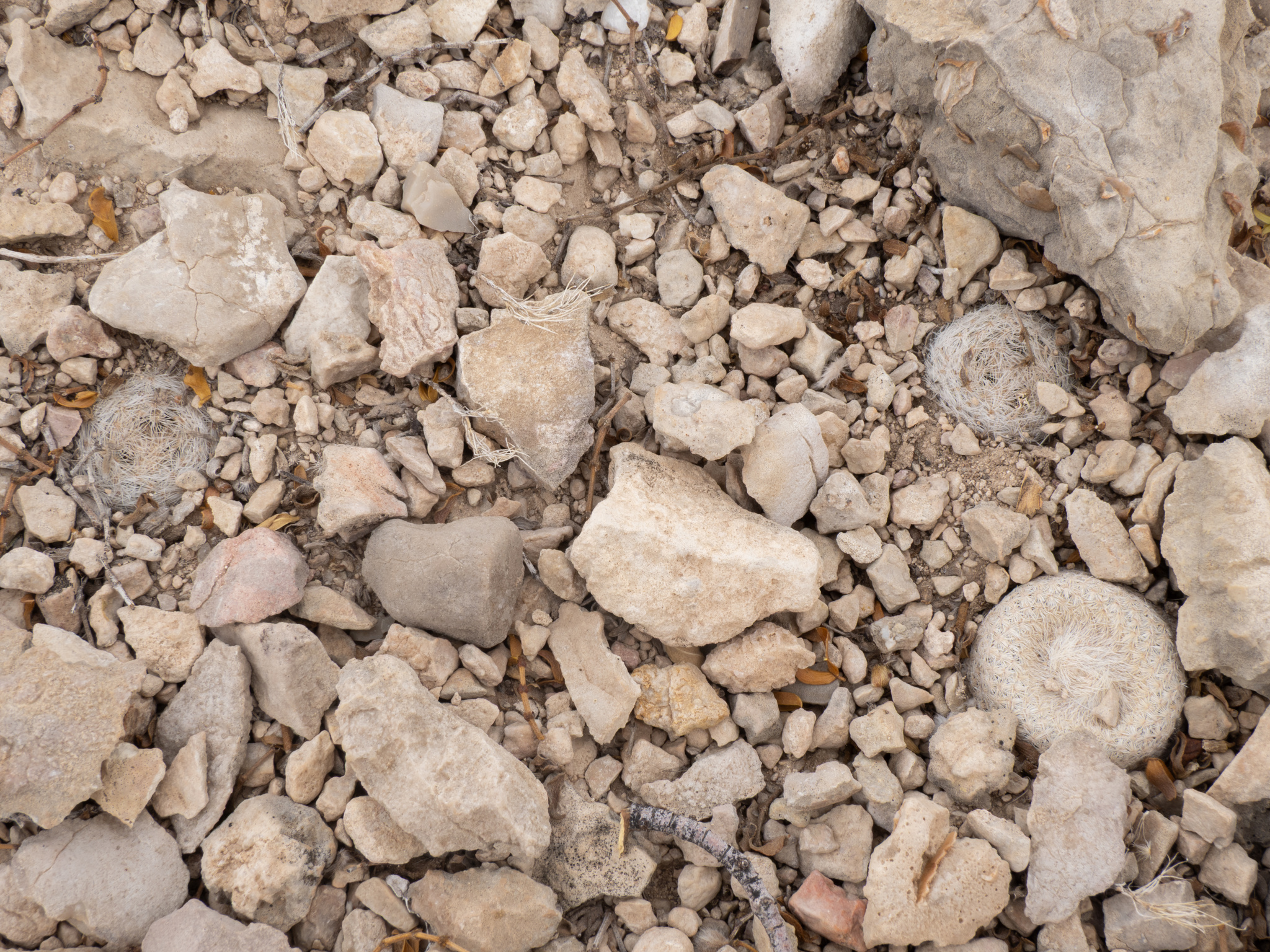
Several plants growing in Big Bend Ranch State Park

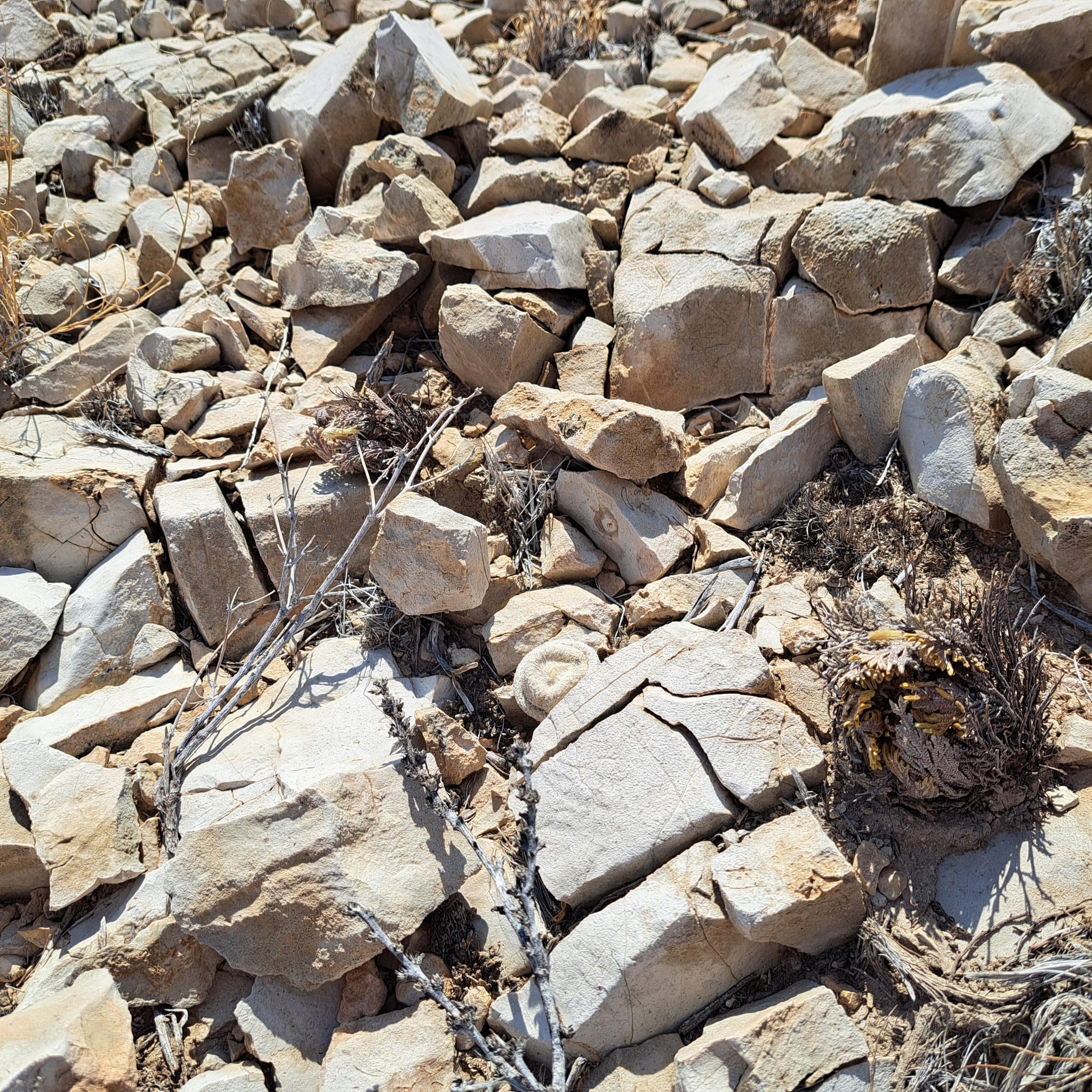
Habitat in Terlingua, Texas

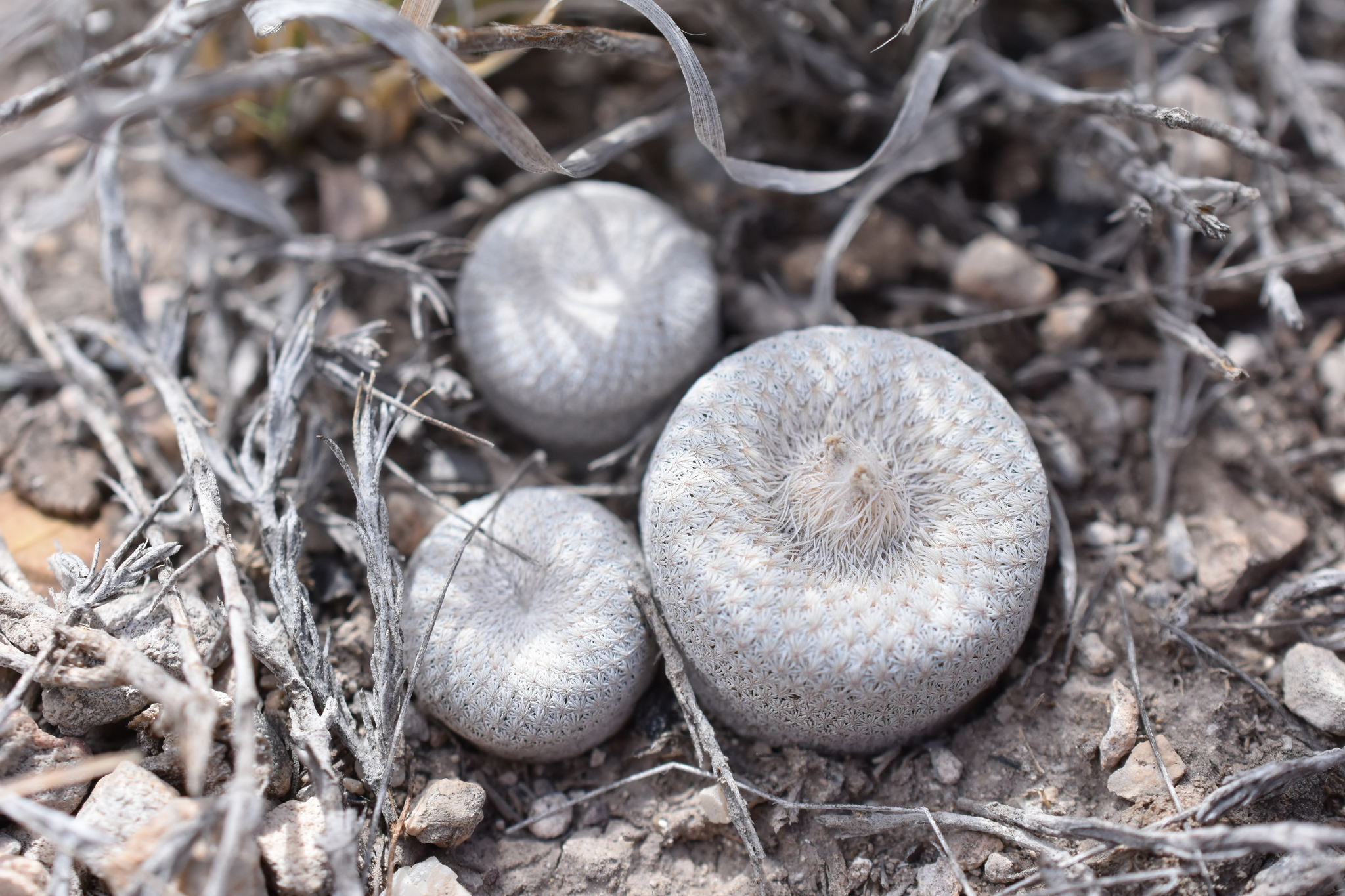
Group of plants in San Juan de Vanegas, San Luis Potosi, Mexico

== Taxonomy ==
Epithelantha bokei was first described by the American botanist Lyman David Benson and published in the scientific journal Cactus and Succulent Journal, volume 41, page 185, in 1969. The specific epithet honors Norman H. Boke, plant anatomist and student of the Cactaceae.
