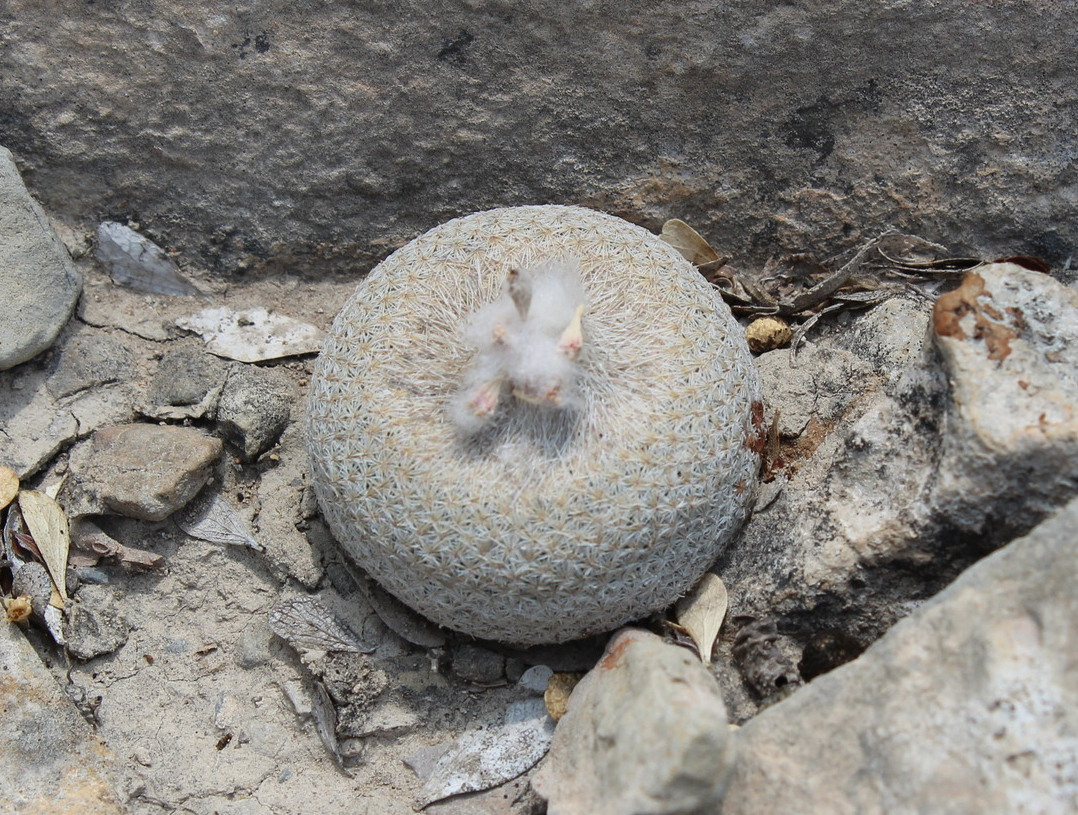

Scientific classification
- Kingdom: Plantae
- Clade: Embryophytes
- Clade: Tracheophytes
- Clade: Angiosperms
- Clade: Eudicots
- Order: Caryophyllales
- Family: Cactaceae
- Subfamily: Cactoideae
- Genus: Epithelantha
- Species: E. ilariae

Binomial name
- Epithelantha ilariae D.Donati & Zanov. 2010

= Epithelantha ilariae =

Species of cactus

Epithelantha ilariae is a species of Epithelantha found in Mexico.

== Description ==
Epithelantha ilariae is a small cactus species that almost always grows alone. It has flattened, spherical stems over 6 cm in diameter. When dehydrated and losing turgor, sunken rings become visible on the stem's surface. The stem is covered with short tubercles, each ending in an areole bearing 30 to 52 spines arranged in two or three overlapping layers. The spines are elliptical in cross-section and waxy white, especially in young plants. Under a microscope, they lack marginal denticles (small teeth). The apex is usually hidden beneath dense white hairs that protect young tissues during growth. Flowers are small, funnel-shaped, and appear at the stem's apex. They range in color from white to pale pink. The elongated, bright red fruits contain small black seeds. Flowering occurs from spring through autumn.

This species closely resembles Epithelantha bokei, making field identification challenging. However, E. ilariae has fewer spines per areola, with fewer overlapping layers. A key feature for identification is the absence of denticles (tiny teeth) on the spine margins, which are smooth in E. ilariae when viewed under a microscope. In contrast, E. bokei's spines have fringed or denticulate edges.

== Distribution ==
Epithelantha ilariae is native to northeastern Mexico. Its distribution spans from the southern slopes of Sierra de Obayos—about 50 km north of Monclova, Coahuila and eastward to areas north of Montemorelos, Nuevo León. It inhabits a broad strip along low-altitude mountain ranges surrounding the Monterrey metropolitan area. Its natural habitat includes deserts and dry scrublands, typically at elevations between 300 and 570 meters. It grows on gently sloping rocky areas with gravel and soil containing moderate organic matter. In some locations, it shares its habitat with other regional cacti, such as Ariocarpus trigonus, Mammillaria lasiacantha, and Echinocereus enneacanthus.

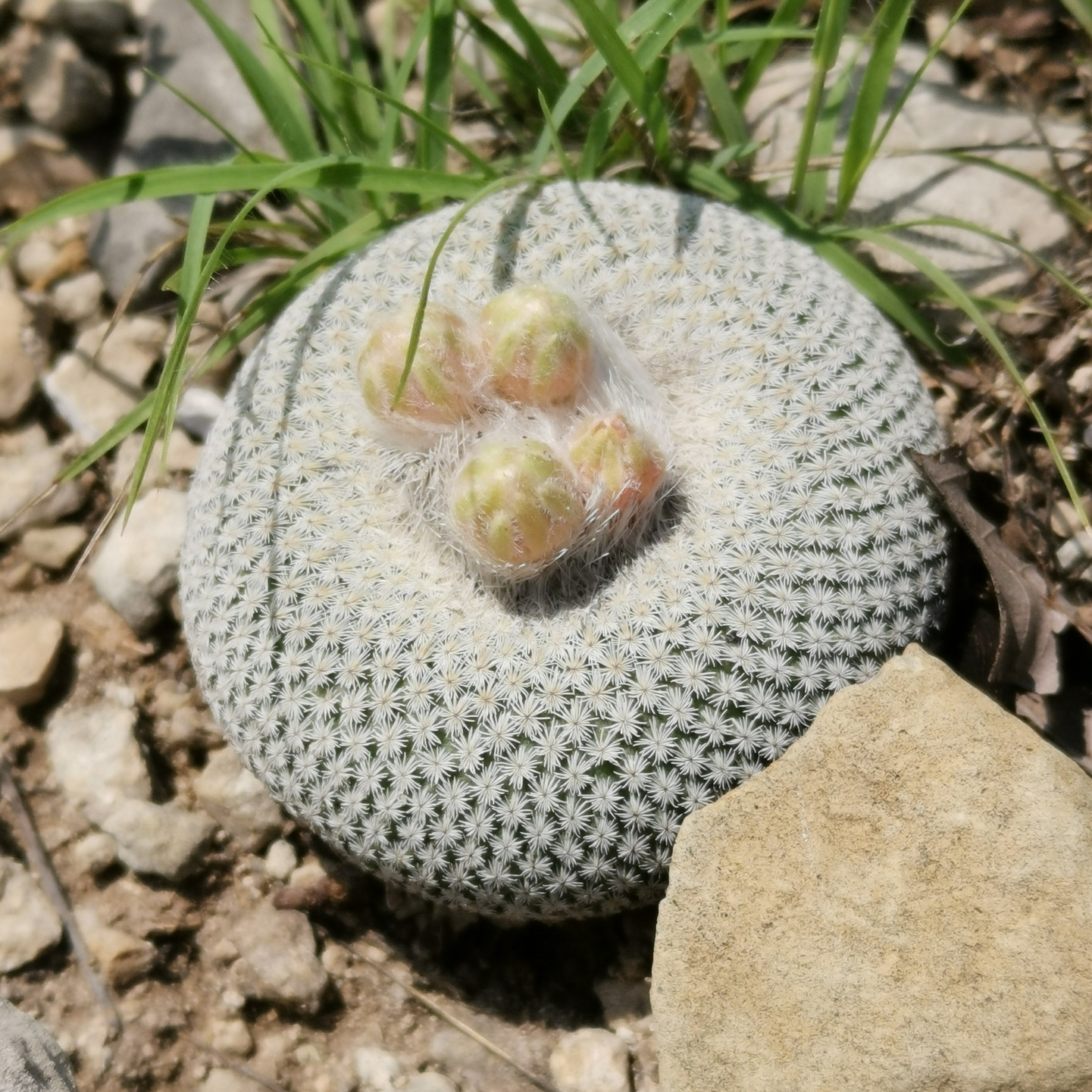
Plant growing in Higueras, Nuevo Leon, Mexico

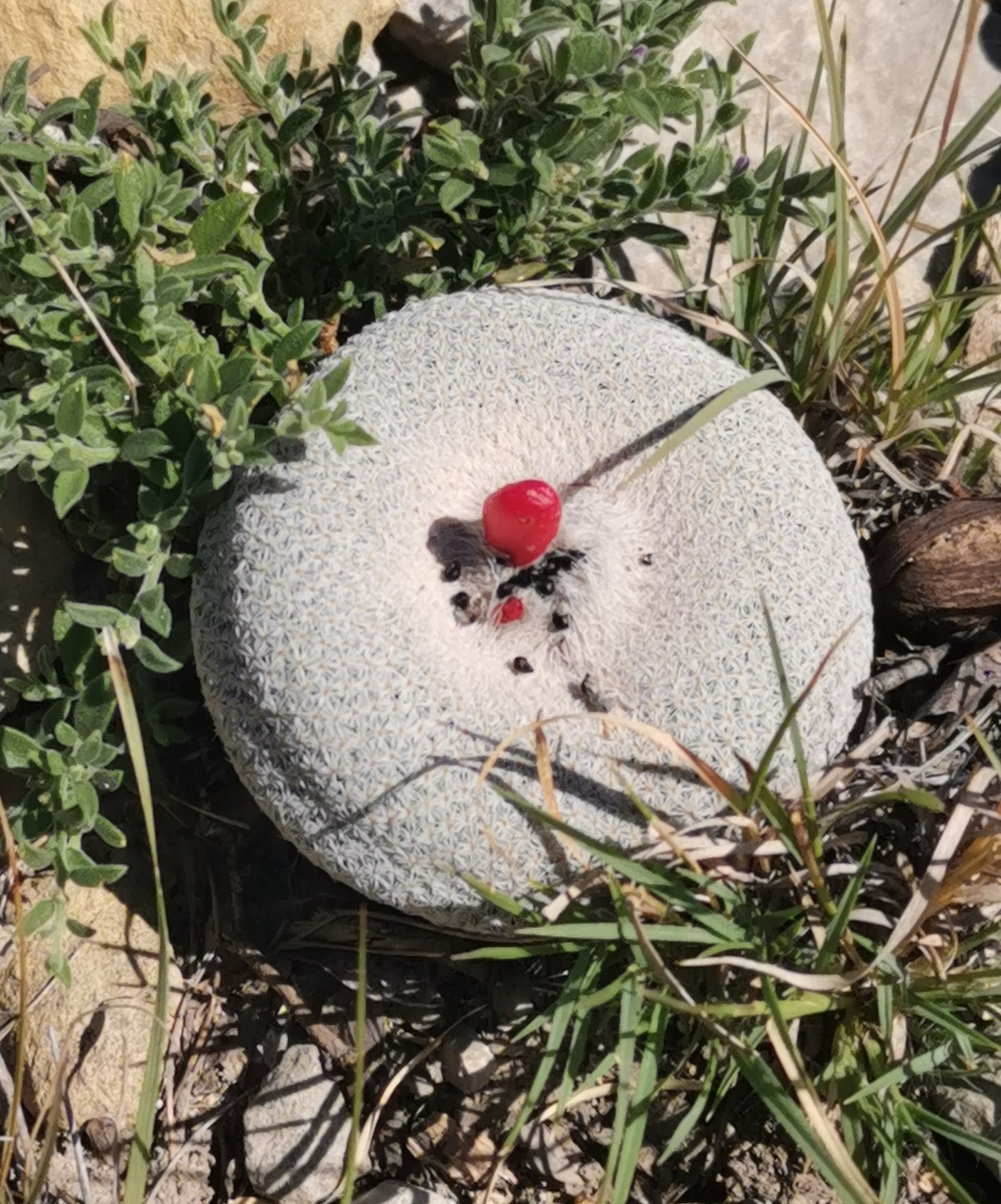
Fruiting plant in Higueras, Nuevo Leon, Mexico

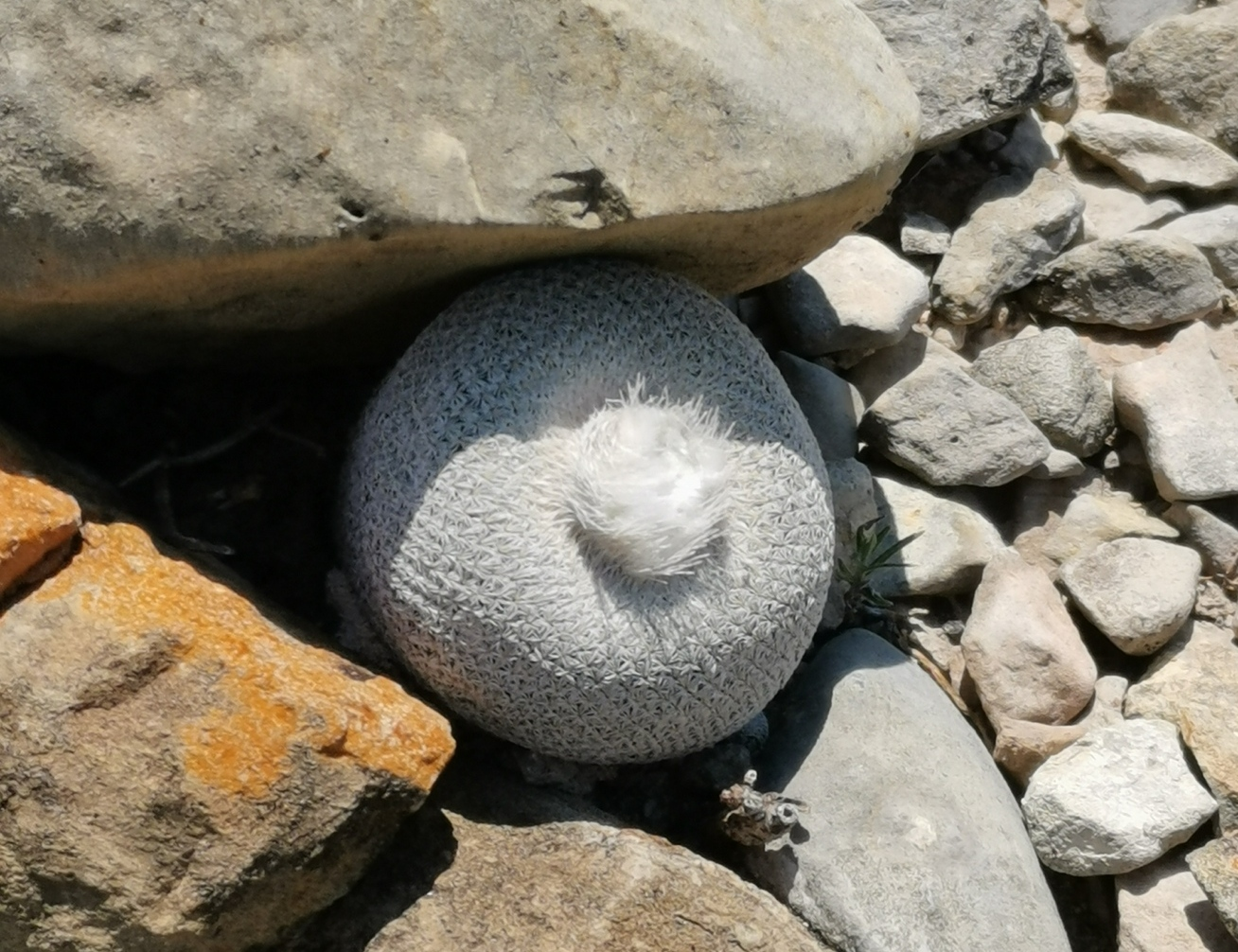

== Taxonomy ==
Epithelantha ilariae was described by botanists Davide Donati and Carlo Zanovello in 2010. The species name honors Ilaria Montanari, a young girl affected by severe liver disease.
