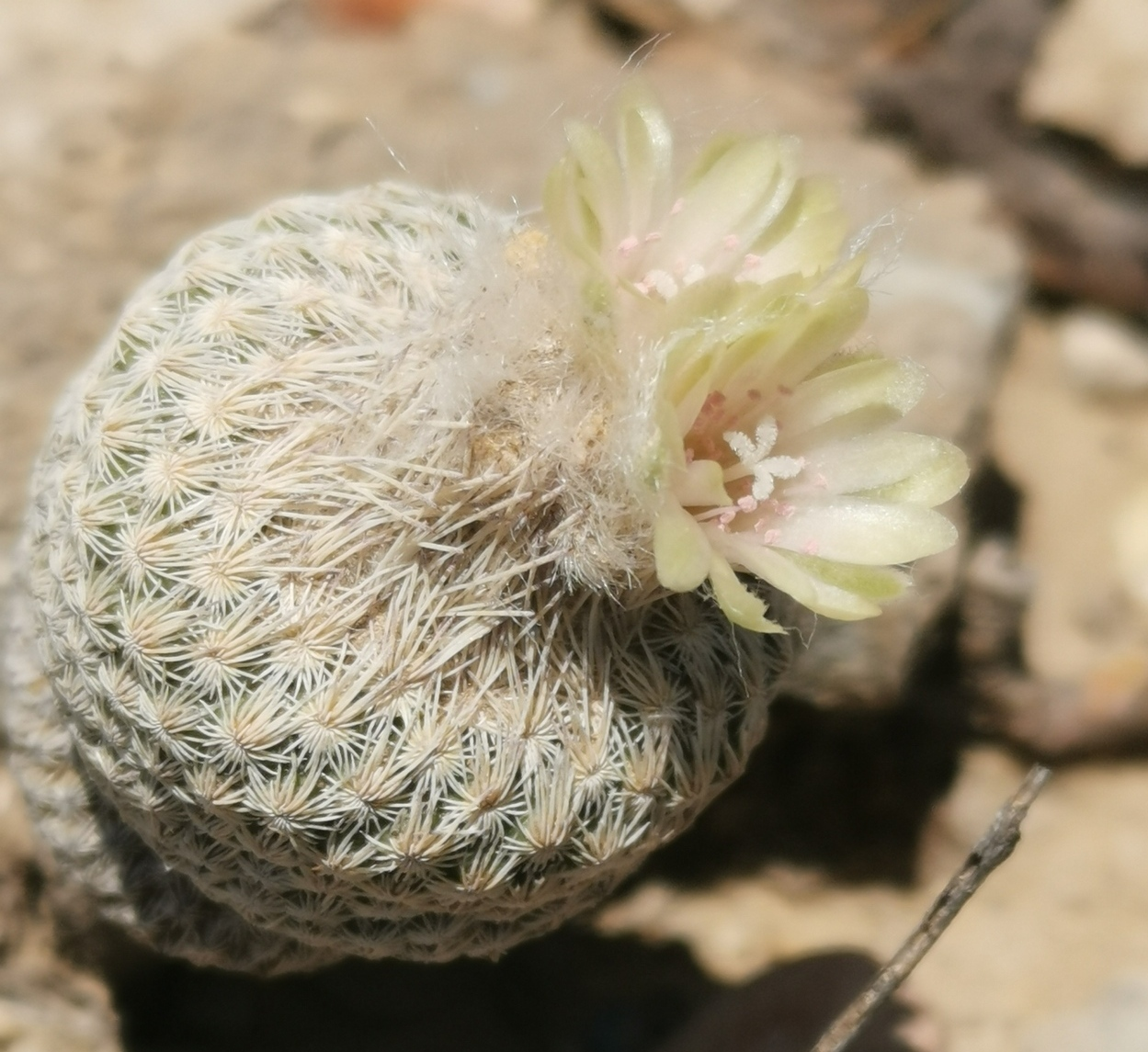

Scientific classification
- Kingdom: Plantae
- Clade: Embryophytes
- Clade: Tracheophytes
- Clade: Spermatophytes
- Clade: Angiosperms
- Clade: Eudicots
- Order: Caryophyllales
- Family: Cactaceae
- Subfamily: Cactoideae
- Genus: Epithelantha
- Species: E. pulchra

Binomial name
- Epithelantha pulchra (D.Donati & Zanov.) D.Aquino & S.Arias 2019

Synonyms
- Epithelantha pachyrhiza subsp. pulchra D.Donati & Zanov. 2010

= Epithelantha pulchra =

Species of cactus

Epithelantha pulchra is a species of Epithelantha found in Mexico.
