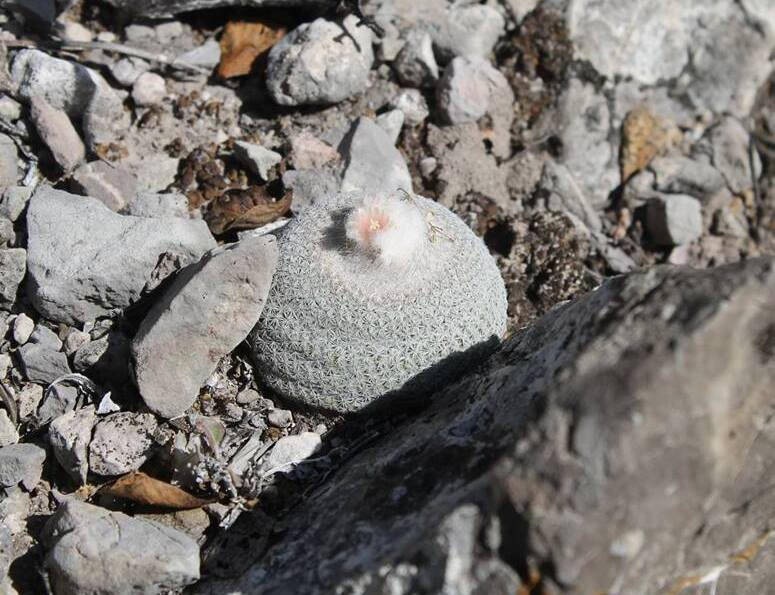

Scientific classification
- Kingdom: Plantae
- Clade: Embryophytes
- Clade: Tracheophytes
- Clade: Spermatophytes
- Clade: Angiosperms
- Clade: Eudicots
- Order: Caryophyllales
- Family: Cactaceae
- Subfamily: Cactoideae
- Genus: Epithelantha
- Species: E. potosina

Binomial name
- Epithelantha potosina (D.Donati & Zanov.) D.Aquino & S.Arias, 2019

Synonyms
- Epithelantha greggii subsp. potosina D.Donati & Zanov.2010

= Epithelantha potosina =

Species of cactus

Epithelantha potosina is a species of Epithelantha found in Mexico.
