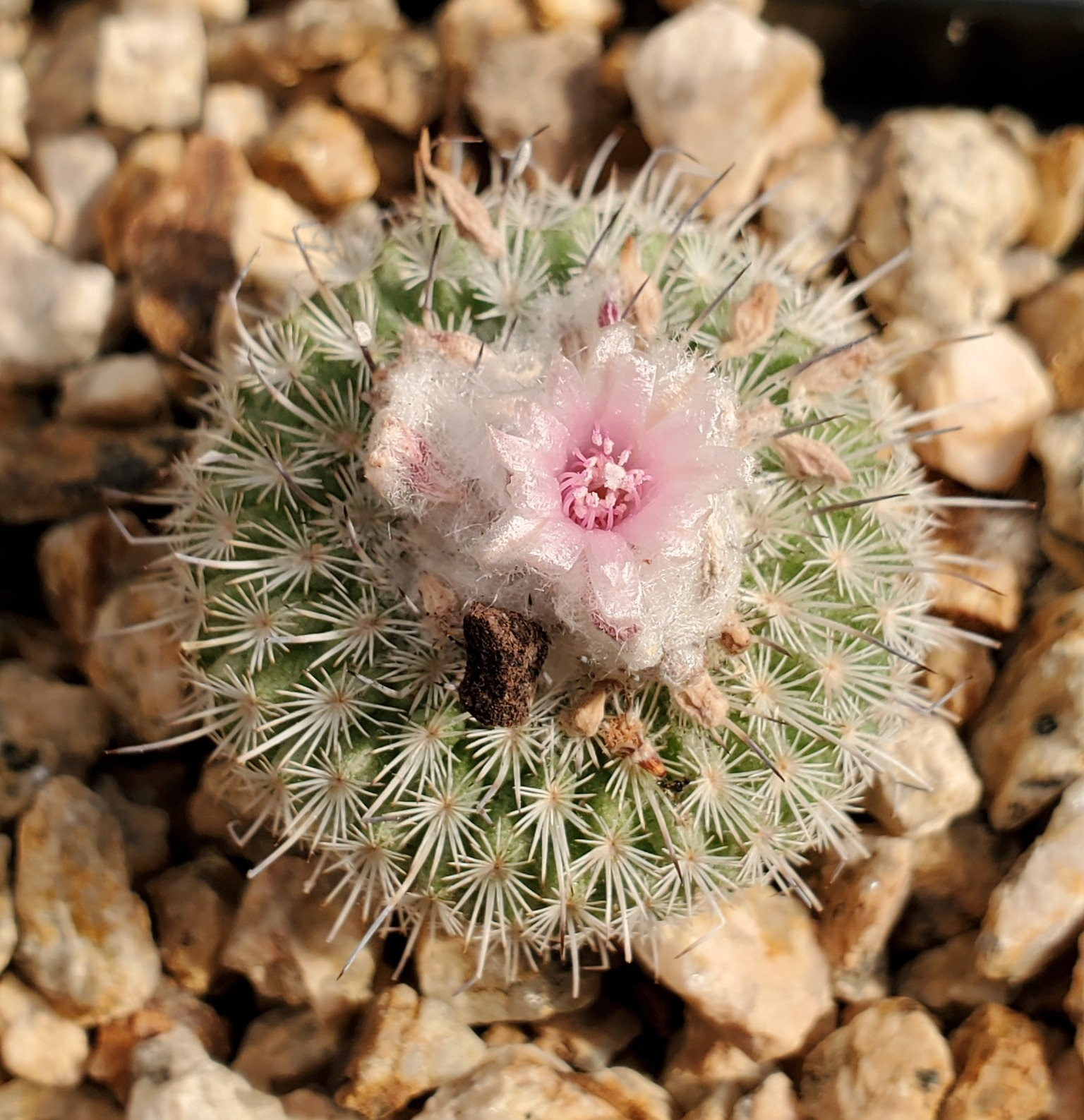

Scientific classification
- Kingdom: Plantae
- Clade: Embryophytes
- Clade: Tracheophytes
- Clade: Spermatophytes
- Clade: Angiosperms
- Clade: Eudicots
- Order: Caryophyllales
- Family: Cactaceae
- Subfamily: Cactoideae
- Genus: Epithelantha
- Species: E. spinosior

Binomial name
- Epithelantha spinosior C.Schmoll, 1951

= Epithelantha spinosior =

Species of cactus

Epithelantha spinosior is a species of Epithelantha found in Mexico.

== Subspecies ==
- Epithelantha spinosior subsp. huastecana (D.Donati & Zanov.) Lodé
- Epithelantha spinosior subsp. spinosior
