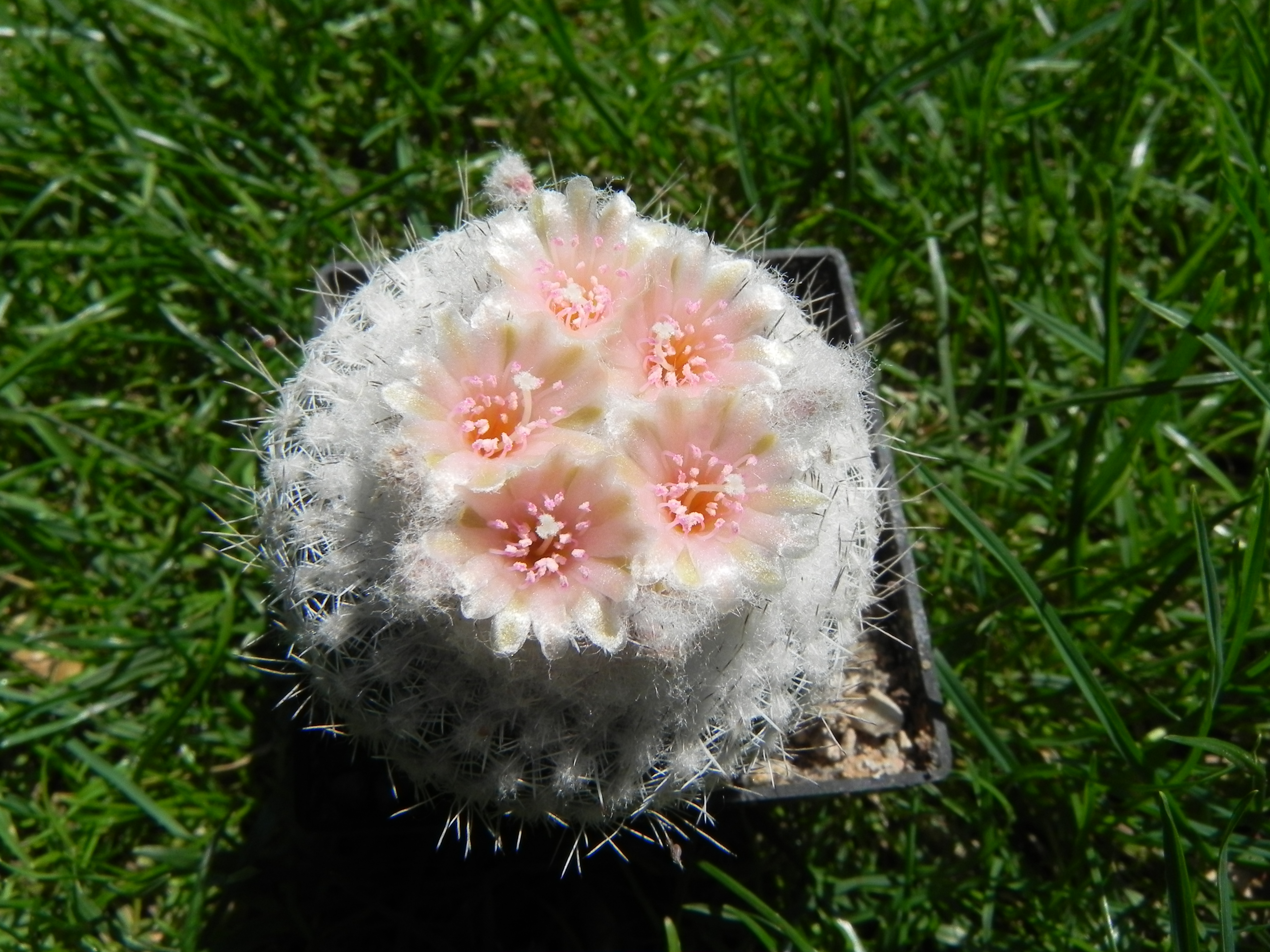

Scientific classification
- Kingdom: Plantae
- Clade: Embryophytes
- Clade: Tracheophytes
- Clade: Spermatophytes
- Clade: Angiosperms
- Clade: Eudicots
- Order: Caryophyllales
- Family: Cactaceae
- Subfamily: Cactoideae
- Genus: Epithelantha
- Species: E. pachyrhiza

Binomial name
- Epithelantha pachyrhiza (W.T.Marshall) Backeb., 1954

Synonyms
- Epithelantha micromeris subsp. pachyrhiza (W.T.Marshall) N.P.Taylor 1998; Epithelantha micromeris var. pachyrhiza W.T.Marshall 1944; Epithelantha micromeris f. elongata (Backeb.) Bravo 1980; Epithelantha micromeris var. elongata Backeb. 1954; Epithelantha pachyrhiza var. elongata Backeb. 1954; Epithelantha pachyrhiza subsp. elongata (Backeb.) D.Donati & Zanov. 2010; Epithelantha pachyrhiza subsp. parvula D.Donati & Zanov. 2010

= Epithelantha pachyrhiza =

Species of cactus

Epithelantha pachyrhiza is a species of Epithelantha found in Mexico.

== Description ==
Epithelantha pachyrhiza grows alone, but occasionally it branches laterally to form small clusters of up to five plants. The plant's body can be spherical or elongated-cylindrical, reaching up to 15 cm in height and 2 cm in diameter. The base of the stem is noticeably constricted, which causes the plant to lean as it grows taller—since the "neck" of the stem lacks sufficient support. There is a distinct constriction, about 1 to 3 cm long, separating the stem from the tuberous, carrot-like roots that store water. The deep green stem is covered with tiny tubercles, each about 3 mm in diameter and 1 mm long. At the tip of each tubercle are areoles that produce 30–40 radial spines. These spines are approximately 1 mm long, range in color from white to orange, and lie flat against the stem. They form a loose tuft, with longer spines at the top that protect the flower and fruit. Over two to three years, the upper spines break and shorten, eventually resembling the lower spines but with a characteristic truncated tip. Flowers appear at the top of the stem, measuring around 5 mm in diameter and 3 mm in length. They range in color from pale yellow to pinkish-white. The fruit is elongated, deep red, about 5 mm long and 3 mm wide, containing a few black seeds approximately 2 mm in diameter.

== Distribution ==
This species is found only in a small area southeast and northeast of Saltillo Valley in Coahuila, Mexico. It inhabits desert and dry scrub environments at elevations between 1200 and 1400 meters. It grows on rocky hill slopes, among rocks, on shallow, humus-rich, calcium-rich soils, indicating a preference for alkaline substrates.

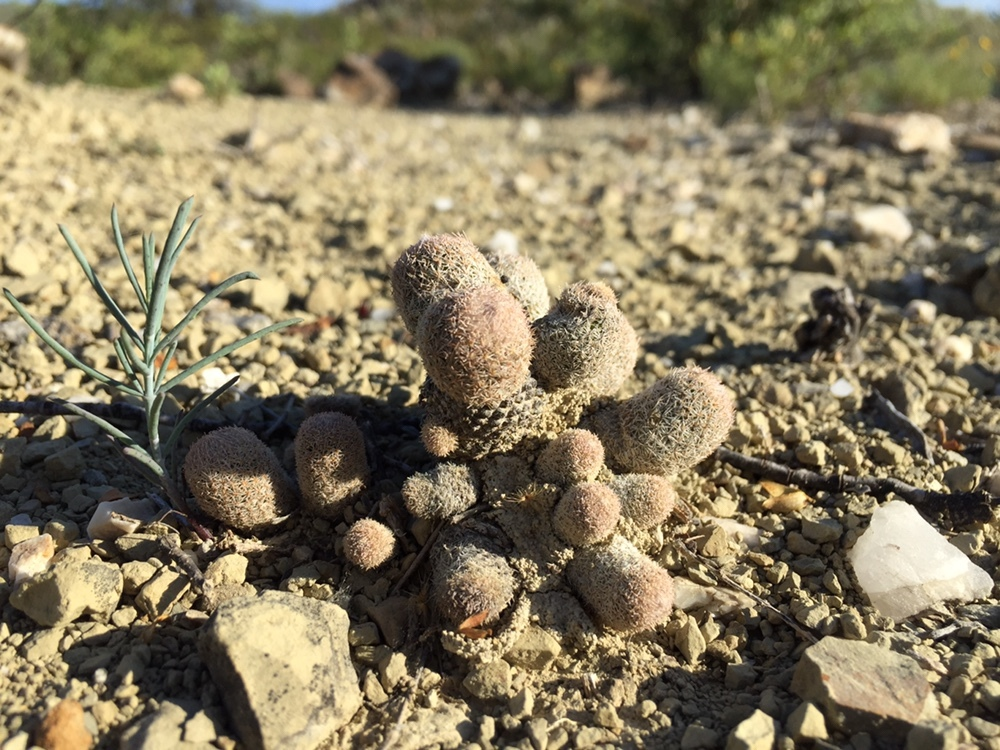
Plant growing in Estación Higo, Coahuila, Mexico

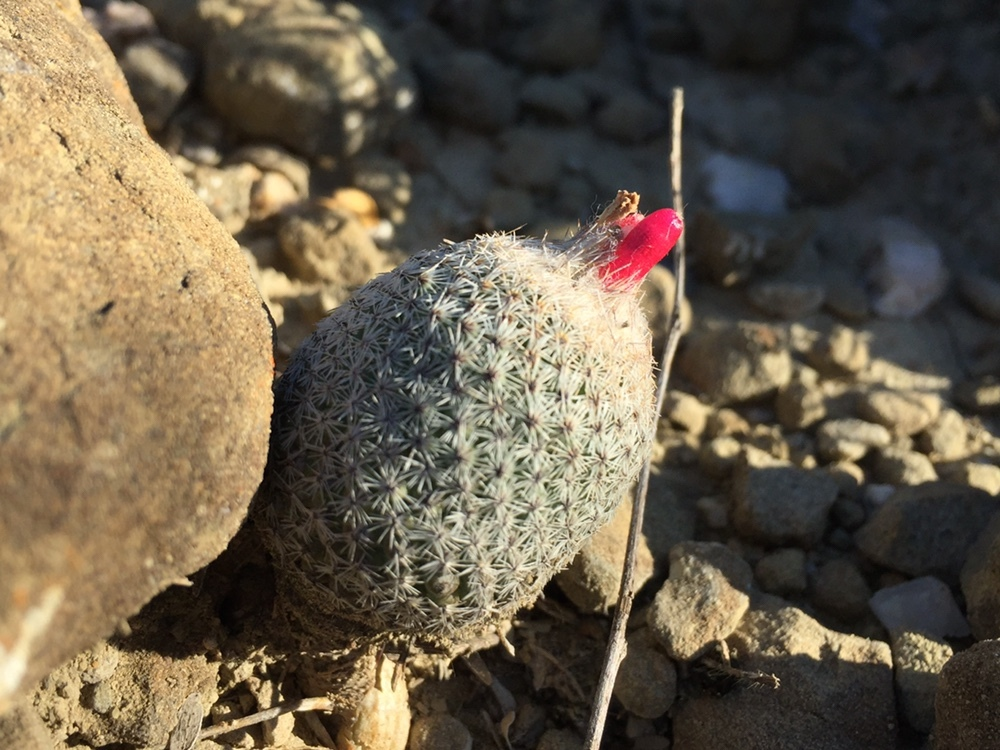
Plant fruiting in El Realito, Coahuila, Mexico

== Taxonomy ==
The plant was first described in 1944 by William Taylor Marshall as Epithelantha micromeris var. pachyrhiza, with the name deriving from the Greek pachyrrhizos meaning "thick-rooted," referring to its tuberous roots. Sometimes, the epithet is spelled pachyrrhiza. In 1954, botanist Curt Backeberg elevated it to species status, renaming it Epithelantha pachyrhiza, and published this change in the journal Cactus.
