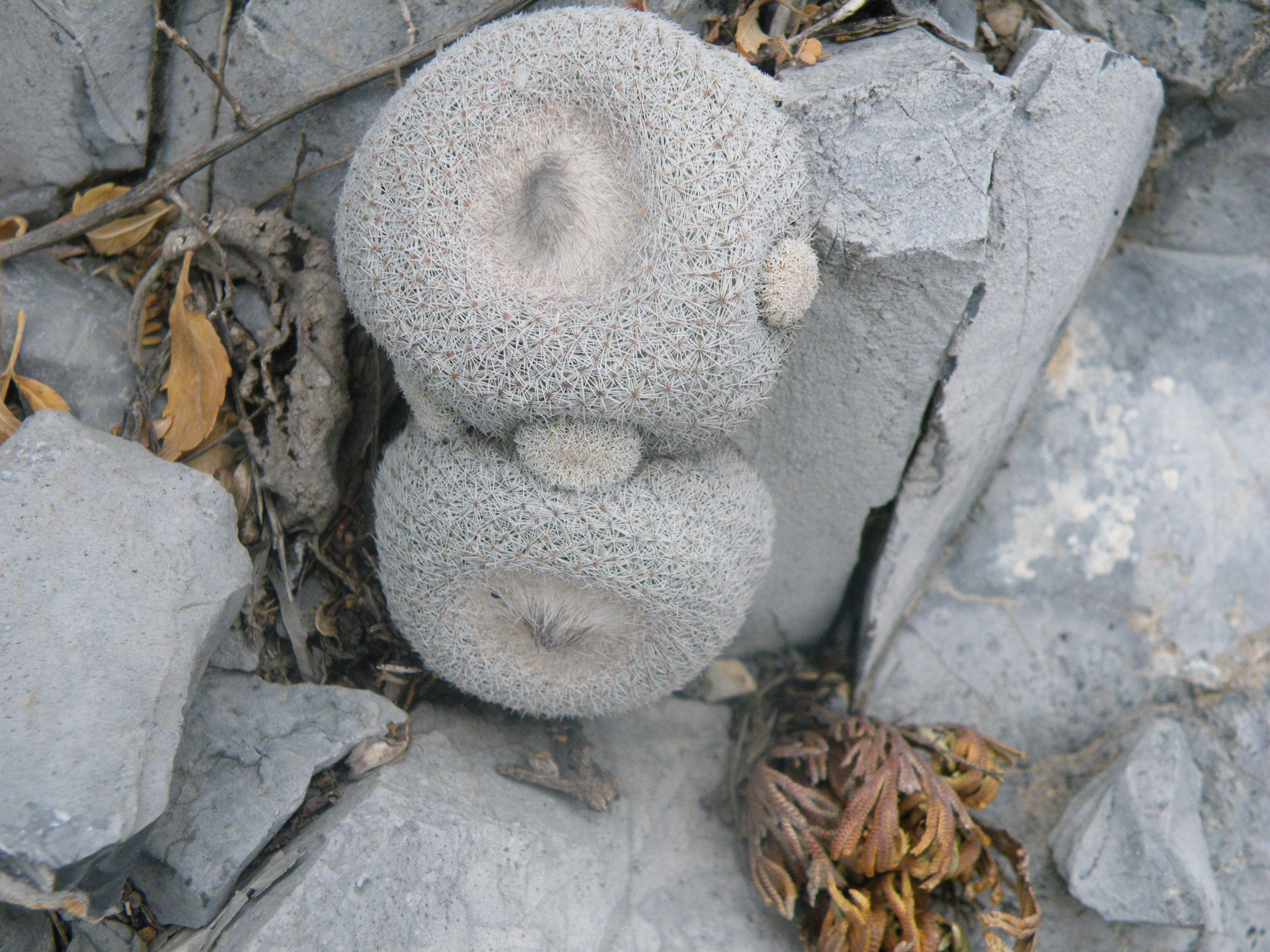

Scientific classification
- Kingdom: Plantae
- Clade: Embryophytes
- Clade: Tracheophytes
- Clade: Spermatophytes
- Clade: Angiosperms
- Clade: Eudicots
- Order: Caryophyllales
- Family: Cactaceae
- Subfamily: Cactoideae
- Genus: Epithelantha
- Species: E. greggii

Binomial name
- Epithelantha greggii (Engelm.) Orcutt, 1926

Synonyms
- Cactus micromeris var. greggii (Engelm.) J.M.Coult. 1894; Cephalomamillaria greggii (Engelm.) Frič 1925; Cephalomamillaria micromeris var. greggii (Engelm.) Frič 1924; Epithelantha micromeris subsp. greggii (Engelm.) N.P.Taylor 1998; Epithelantha micromeris var. greggii (Engelm.) Borg 1937; Mammillaria greggii (Engelm.) Saff. in Rep. (Annual) 1909; Mammillaria micromeris var. greggii Engelm. 1856; Epithelantha densispina Bravo 1951; Epithelantha micromeris var. densispina (Bravo) Backeb. 1954; Epithelantha micromeris var. rufispina (Bravo) Backeb. 1954; Epithelantha rufispina Bravo 1951

= Epithelantha greggii =

Species of cactus

Epithelantha greggii is a species of Epithelantha found in Mexico.

== Description ==
Epithelantha greggii is a small cactus species characterized by a branched, generally spherical or obovoid stem. The stem often has a flattened top with a depressed apex and measures 5 to 7.5 cm in diameter. Its surface is densely covered with spines, giving it a compact appearance. The root system is typically diffuse. The plant has numerous tiny tubercles, about 1 to 2 mm in size, which do not fuse into ribs. These hemispherical or short-cylindrical tubercles are arranged in tight spirals around the stem. At the tip of each tubercle is a small, nearly circular areole, about 1 mm long and lacking glands. When the plant is juvenile, the areoles show slight wooliness; in mature stems, wool becomes more prominent at the apex. Spines are abundant—more than 20 per areole—and vary in color from chalk-white to ash-gray or reddish-brown. They are 3 to 5 mm long, straight, cylindrical, slender, and arranged radially from an early age. The spines are not pectinate or pressed against the stem and are non-pungent, with the upper spines being longer. The flowers are small, funnel-shaped, and pink, opening during the day. They are less conspicuous, emerging at the upper edges of spine clusters at the plant's apex. The flowers open partially, with only the distal part visible above the woolly area, which is covered by longer spines. Flowering occurs in late spring to early summer. Fruits are bright red, slender, and narrowly cylindrical, about 1.8 cm long and 2–3 mm (occasionally up to 5 mm) wide. They are initially somewhat succulent but dry quickly, becoming papery. The fruits lack spines and pulp, have a smooth surface, and shed floral remnants easily. Fruiting occurs in summer.

== Distribution ==
This species is native to Nuevo Leon and Coahuila states of Mexico growing mainly in desert and dry scrub habitats at elevations of 700 to 1300 meters. The plant favors gently sloping hills and mountain plateaus with coarse gravel soils. It is found growing along with Echinocactus horizonthalonius, Ariocarpus retusus, Ariocarpus fissuratus, Coryphantha poselgeriana, Coryphantha pseudoechinus, Coryphantha delaetiana, Coryphantha gladiispina, Grusonia bradtiana, Escobaria strobiliformis, Lophophora williamsii, Thelocactus bicolor, Sclerocactus mariposensis, Mammillaria lasiacantha, Opuntia microdasys, Neolloydia conoidea, and Mammillaria pottsii.

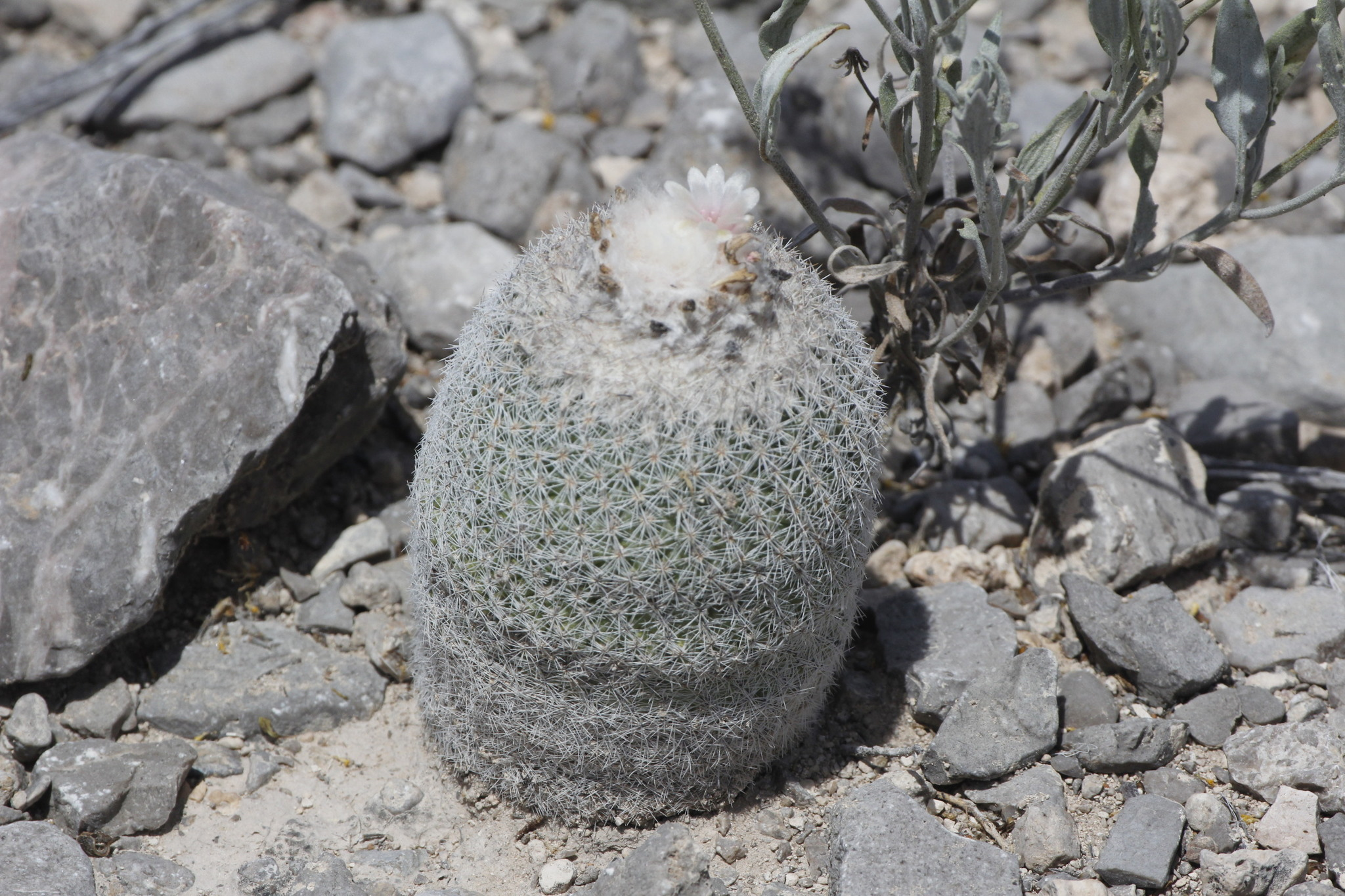
Blooming plant in Cuatrociénegas Municipality, Coahuila, Mexico

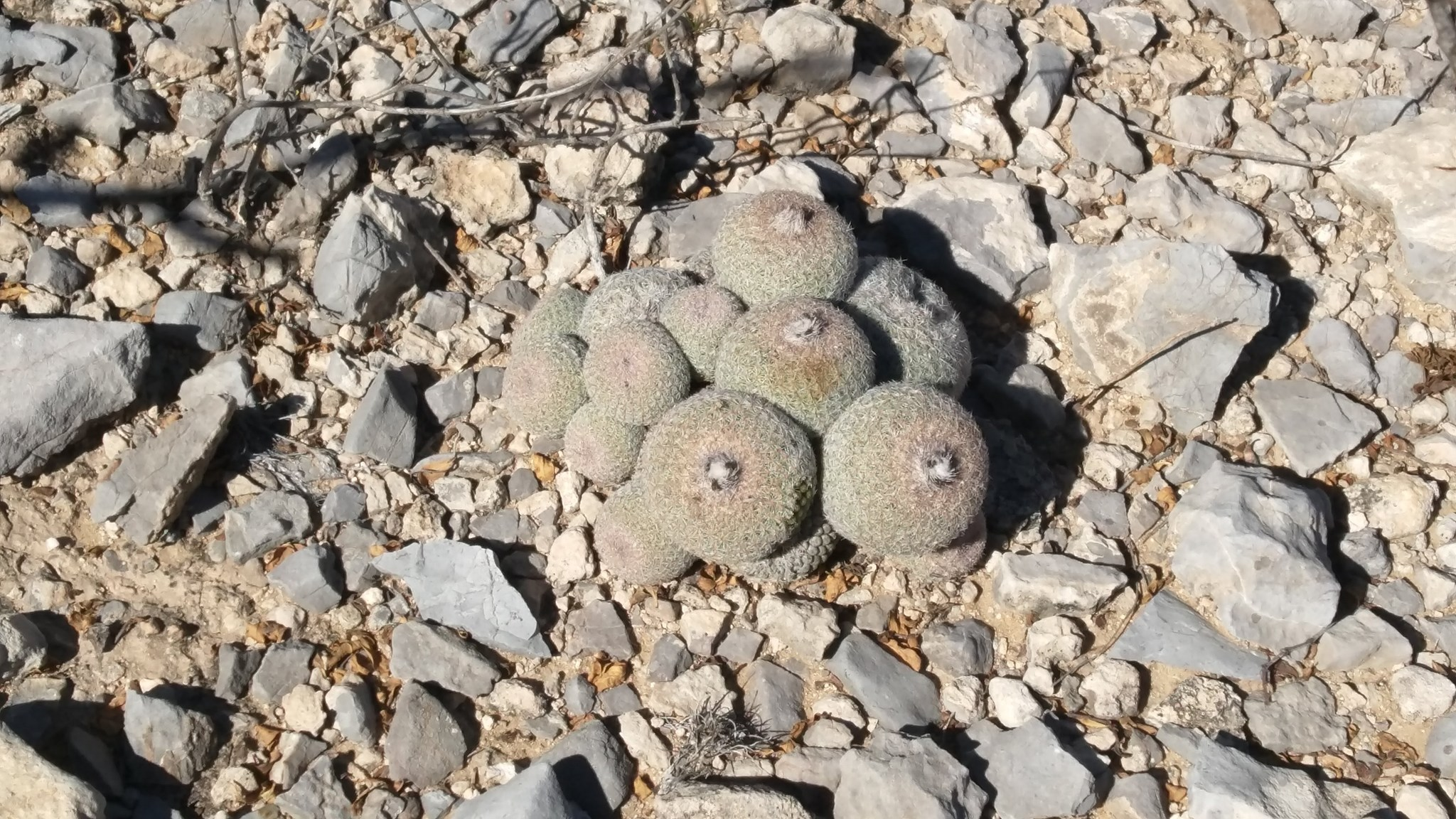
Plant growing in San José de la Popa, Nuevo Leon, Mexico

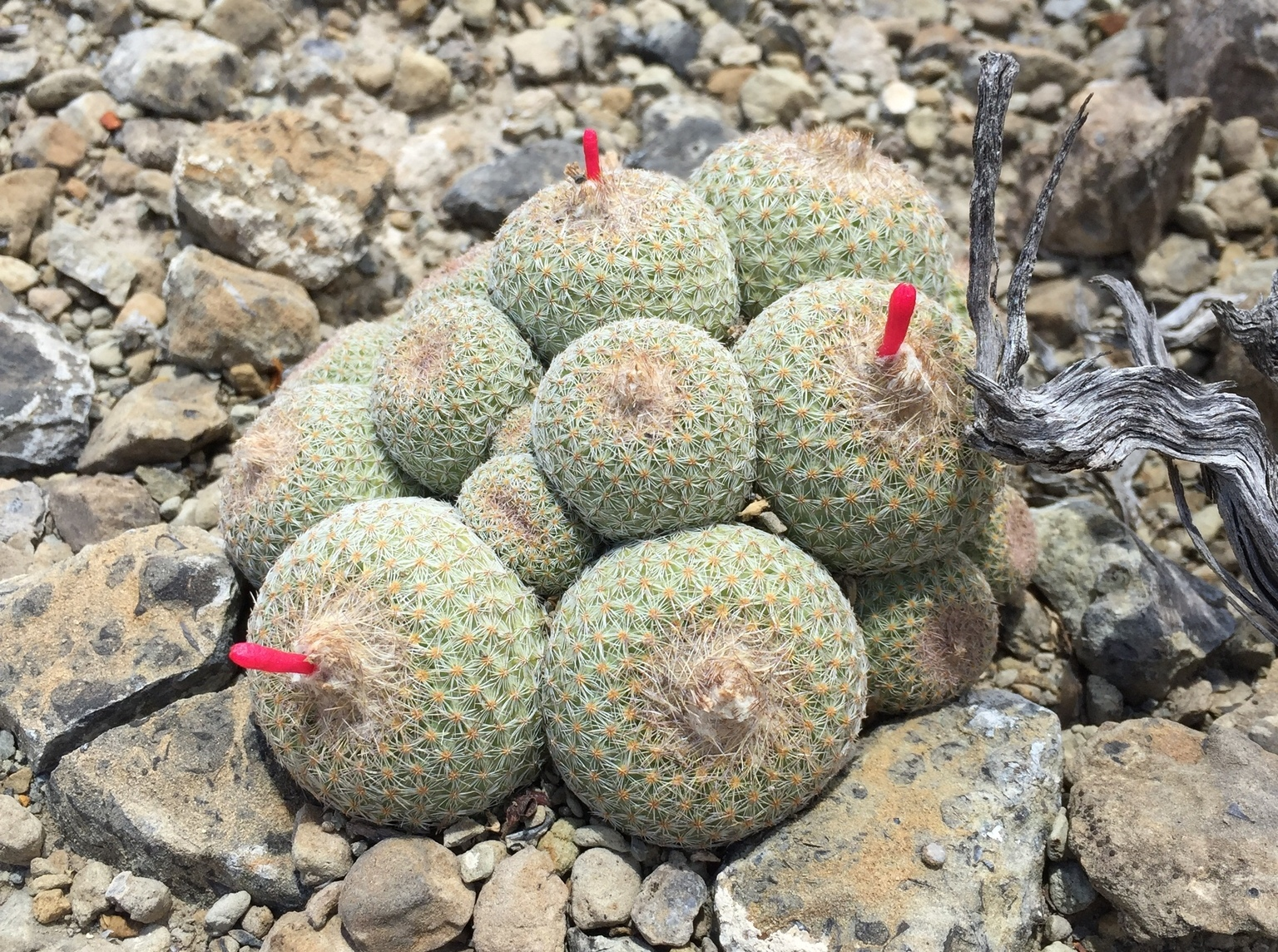
Fruiting plant in Rincón Colorado, Coahuila, Mexico

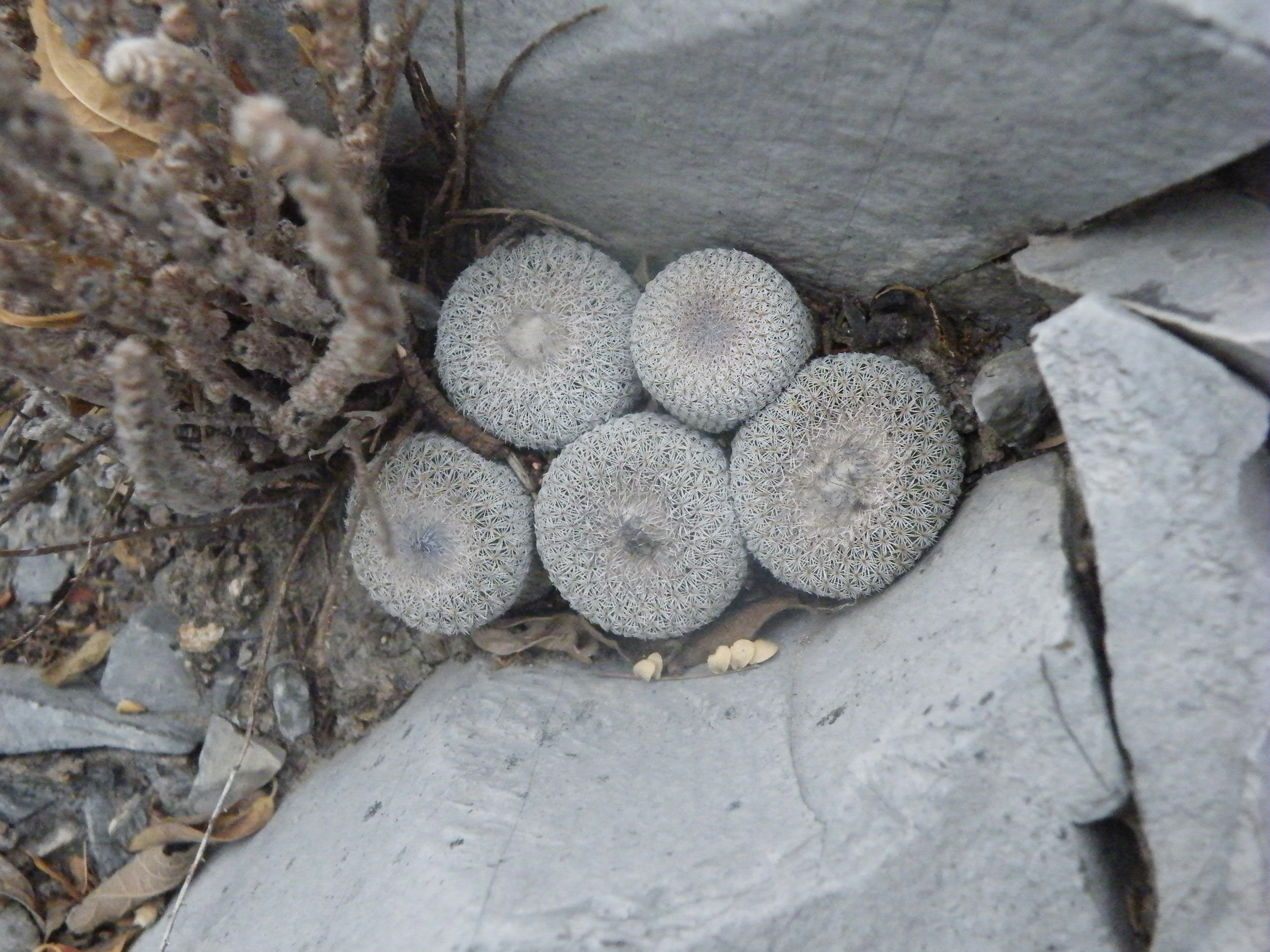
Plant growing in Huasteca Canyon, Nuevo Leon

== Taxonomy ==
It was described in 1856 by George Engelmann as Mammillaria micromeris var. greggii, and was later elevated to species status and transferred to the genus Epithelantha by Charles Russell Orcutt in 1926. The species name greggii honors the American naturalist Josiah Gregg.
