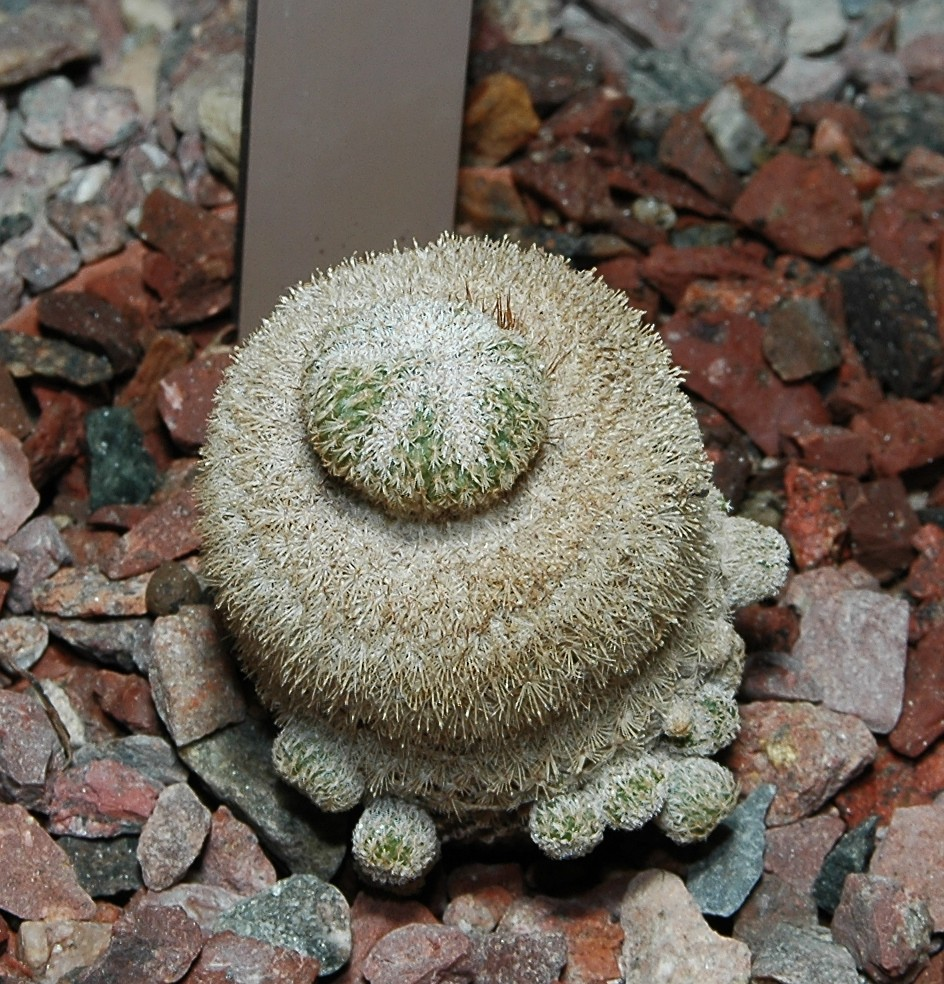
- Epithelantha micromeris

Scientific classification
- Kingdom: Plantae
- Clade: Tracheophytes
- Clade: Angiosperms
- Clade: Eudicots
- Order: Caryophyllales
- Family: Cactaceae
- Subfamily: Cactoideae
- Tribe: Cacteae
- Genus: Epithelantha; F.A.C.Weber ex Britton & Rose

Type species
- Epithelantha micromeris

= Epithelantha =

Genus of cacti

Epithelantha (button cactus) is a genus of cactus that is native to north-eastern Mexico, and the south-western United States. There are ten species recognised in the genus Epithelantha. The name Epithelantha refers to the flower position near the apex of the tubercles.

== Description ==
Epithelantha species grow either solitarily or in dense clusters formed by offsets. They vary in size, spination, growth habit, and color. The plant body is depressed-globose or cylindrical stems, measuring around 1 to 6 cm in diameter. The surface is distinctly tuberculate and fully covered with spines. Tubercles are 1 to 3 mm long with small areoles at their tips. The spines, numbering 19 to 38, are arranged in several series without clear central or radial differentiation and are colored from white to pale yellow. Flowers bloom in spring and summer, emerging from the stem. They are bell-shaped, measure 3 to 12 mm, and range in color from white to pink. The pericarpel is smooth and glabrous. Fruits are club-shaped, bright red, smooth, and indehiscent, measuring 3 to 18 mm. They contain a few seeds, which are oval, 1 to 1.5 mm long, glossy black, and have a reticulate or finely warty surface. Plants in this genus are closely related and similar to Mammillaria. However, key differences exist: Mammillaria has bipartite areoles and flowers that emerge from the base of tubercles, while Epithelantha has areoles with a different structure and flowers that emerge from the apex of the areole—the same area that produces spines.

== Distribution ==
Plants in this genus are from Arizona, New Mexico, and Texas in Southern United States to northeastern Mexico, including the states of Coahuila, San Luis Potosí, and Nuevo León. Plants mainly grow in open areas, often partly covered by limestone fragments.

== Taxonomy ==
This genus was first described in 1922 by Frédéric Albert Constantin Weber, Nathaniel Lord Britton, and Joseph Nelson Rose who published it in The Cactaceae. The genus is named after the morphological characteristics that the flowers grow directly from the stem tubercles. Before 1922, all species now classified as Epithelantha were included within Mammillaria.

== Species ==
As of June 2026, Plants of the World Online accepted ten species:

Image	Scientific name	Distribution
	Epithelantha bokei L.D.Benson	Texas in the United States and Coahuila in Mexico
	Epithelantha cryptica D.Donati & Zanov.	Mexico (Coahuila)
	Epithelantha greggii (Engelm.) Orcutt	Mexico (Coahuila)
	Epithelantha ilariae D.Donati & Zanov.	Mexico (Nuevo León)
	Epithelantha micromeris (Engelm.) F.A.C.Weber ex Britton & Rose	United States in Arizona, New Mexico, and Texas, and in Mexico in the states of Chihuahua, Coahuila, Durango, Nuevo León, San Luis Potosí and Zacatecas
	Epithelantha pachyrhiza (W.T.Marshall) Backeb.	Mexico (Coahuila)
	Epithelantha polycephala Backeb.	Mexico (Coahuila)
	Epithelantha potosina (D.Donati & Zanov.) D.Aquino & S.Arias	Mexico (San Luis Potosí)
	Epithelantha pulchra (D.Donati & Zanov.) D.Aquino & S.Arias	Mexico (Nuevo León)
	Epithelantha spinosior C.Schmoll	Mexico (Coahuila, Nuevo León)
