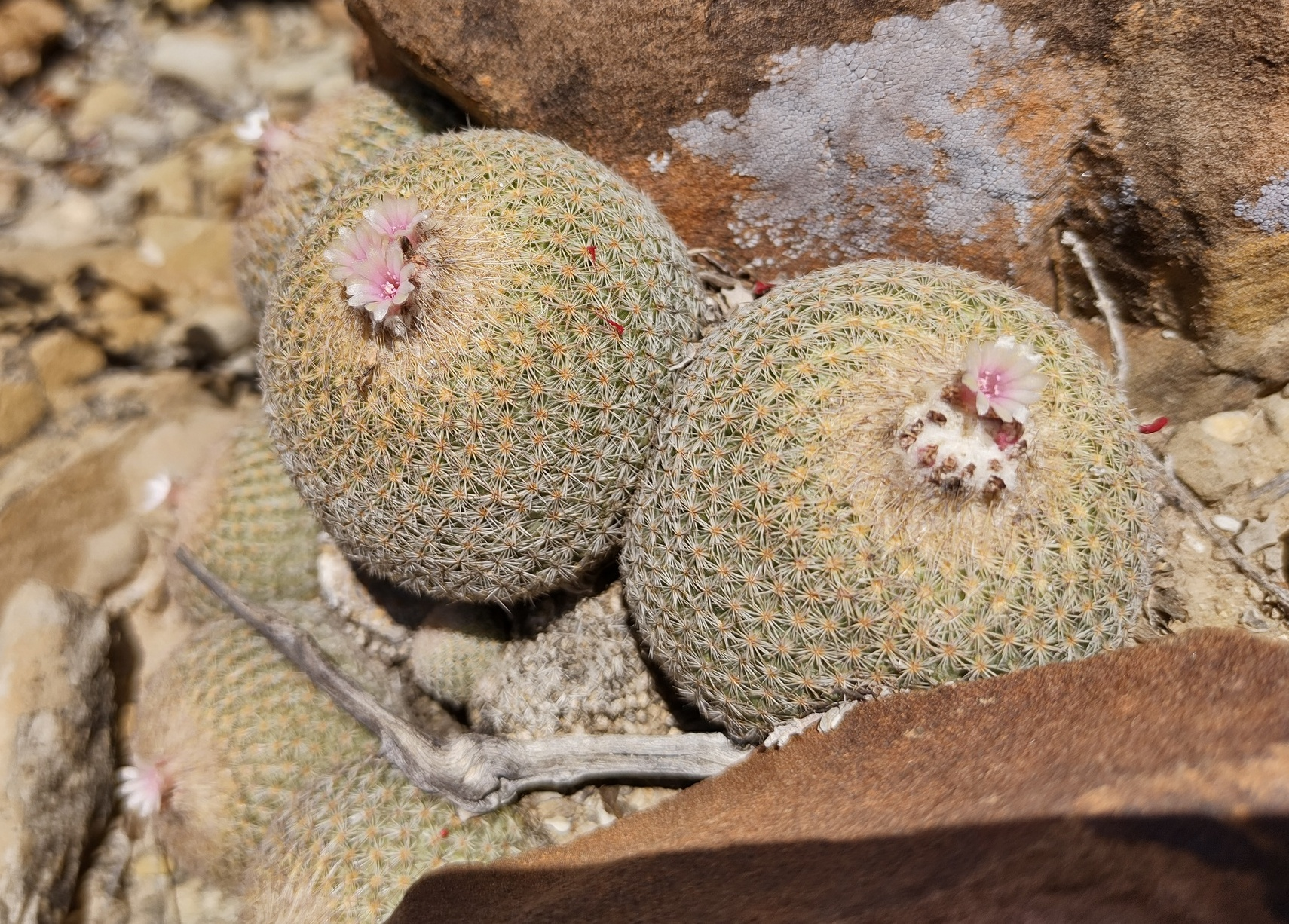

Scientific classification
- Kingdom: Plantae
- Clade: Embryophytes
- Clade: Tracheophytes
- Clade: Spermatophytes
- Clade: Angiosperms
- Clade: Eudicots
- Order: Caryophyllales
- Family: Cactaceae
- Subfamily: Cactoideae
- Genus: Epithelantha
- Species: E. polycephala

Binomial name
- Epithelantha polycephala Backeb., 1954

Synonyms
- Epithelantha greggii subsp. polycephala (Backeb.) D.Donati & Zanov. 2010; Epithelantha micromeris var. polycephala (Backeb.) Glass & R.A.Foster 1978; Epithelantha micromeris subsp. polycephala (Backeb.) Glass 1998 publ. 1997

= Epithelantha polycephala =

Species of cactus

Epithelantha polycephala is a species of Epithelantha found in Mexico.
