= Mammillaria pottsii =

Scientific classification
- Kingdom: Plantae
- Clade: Tracheophytes
- Clade: Angiosperms
- Clade: Eudicots
- Order: Caryophyllales
- Family: Cactaceae
- Subfamily: Cactoideae
- Genus: Mammillaria
- Species: M. pottsii

Binomial name
- Mammillaria pottsii Scheer ex Salm-Dyck

Synonyms
- This species has 11 synonyms: (see text)

Species of cactus

Mammillaria pottsii, commonly known as rat-tail nipple cactus or fox-tail cactus, is a species of succulent flowering plant in the genus Mammillaria, within the family Cactaceae. It is native to the southern United States and northern and north-central Mexico.

== Description ==
Plant with fruits

Mammillaria pottsii is a species of cactus with cylindrical stems which measure up to 20 cm in height and 2.5 - 3 cm in diameter. This species branches at the base or along the stems. The epidermis is blue-green in color.

The tubercles are cone-shaped to ovate, 3 to 5 mm in length, and do not produce latex when wounded. The areoles are somewhat woolly in the axils. There are approximately 7 central spines per areole; these measure 0.4 to 1.2 cm in length and are brown to blue-black in color. They are thickened at their bases, point outward, are bent, and are recurved to spreading. The uppermost central spine points upwards, is darkened at the apex, and is especially long and thick. There are also 30 to 45 radial spines, measuring 0.3 to 0.5 cm in length and white to light tan in color; these are narrow, straight, and interlocking. Young plants have fewer central and radial spines.

The flowers are brown-red in color and campanulate. They develop in a circular pattern approximately 2 cm under the apex of the plant. They only open slightly, and measure 9 to 15 mm in length and 6 to 13 cm in diameter. The inner tepals are light purple in color and somewhat reflexed near the tips, which are acute. The tepals are usually darker in the center and lighter at the margins. The stamens are cream to pale yellow in color and shorter than the style; they are purplish towards the ends. The stigma has 4 to 5 narrow lobes, which are red-purple to orange-yellow in color.

In habitat, this species blooms in late February and March. The flowers open at around midday for 3 to 6 days and close at night.

The fruits are red in color and club-shaped, measuring approximately 1.5 cm in length. They take 1 to several months to develop and mature.

Growth form

The seeds are black to black-brown or dark red-brown in color, more or less oval in shape, and approximately 1 mm in length.

== Distribution and habitat ==
Mammillaria pottsii is native to southwestern Texas in the United States and to central and eastern Chihuahua, Coahuila, western Nuevo León, northeastern and eastern Durango, Zacatecas, and northwestern San Luis Potosí in Mexico.

It is found at altitudes of 800 to 2100 meters above sea level in xerophytic shrubland, where it grows on flaking limestone substrates with very little organic matter in limestone crevices, gravelly areas on hills, and washes.

== Taxonomy ==
The name Mammillaria pottsii was first coined in 1849 by the German botanist Joseph zu Salm-Reifferscheidt-Dyck and published in 1850 by the German botanist Frederick Scheer.

Etymology

- Mammillaria: the genus name is derived from the Latin word mămilla (meaning "nipple") and the suffix –āria, which was often used in genus names published by Haworth (such as Mammillaria). It refers to the nipple-like tubercles of the plants of this genus, as well, possibly, as to the tendency of some species to produce a milky latex when wounded.
- pottsii: the specific epithet honors the English plant collector John Potts (1805 - 1876), director of the mint in Chihuahua.

Synonyms

This species has 11 synonyms:

- Cactus pottsii (Scheer ex Salm-Dyck) Kuntze
- Chilita pottsii (Scheer ex Salm-Dyck) Orcutt
- Coryphantha pottsiana (Poselg.) A.D.Zimmerman
- Coryphantha pottsii (Scheer ex Salm-Dyck) Orcutt
- Echinocactus pottsianus Poselg.
- Krainzia pottsii (Scheer ex Salm-Dyck) Doweld
- Leptocladia leona (Poselg.) Buxb.
- Mammillaria leona Poselg.
- Mammillaria pottsii var. gigas Repp.
- Mammillaria pottsii var. multicaulis Repp.
- Neomammillaria pottsii (Scheer ex Salm-Dyck) Britton & Rose

== Conservation status ==
On the IUCN Red List, Mammillaria pottsii is classified as being of Least Concern (LC). This signifies that there are no major threats to the species' survival, and that its populations are not fragmented and stable in number.

== Cultivation ==
Due to its high susceptibility to rot in wet conditions, Mammillaria pottsii is one of the more difficult Mammillaria species to cultivate. It requires a loose, well-drained, mineral soil with very little organic matter, as well as a small pot with good drainage.

It should be kept completely dry during the winter and in an area with good airflow in order to prevent rot. In early spring, gradually increase irrigation until late spring; from late spring to late summer (or as long as the weather is hot), it should be irrigated regularly. During the summer, it should be given a fertilizer rich in potassium. In late summer (or whenever the weather begins to cool), irrigation should be decreased again for the winter to induce a state of semi-dormancy.

If kept dry, Mammillaria pottsii is hardy to -5 ºC (23 ºF), or even lower for brief periods.

This species prefers a place with high light levels: this encourages flowering and wool production. It may, however, appreciate some shade during the hottest parts of the summer. Too much shade, though, may lead to the plant becoming unnaturally green and lush, as well as an increased risk of etiolation or rot.

It remains compact, so it is a good container plant. With age, it produces pups (offshoots).

Mammillaria pottsii may be propagated via seed or pups. Seeds should be sown in a warm place, and will germinate in approximately 7 to 14 days at temperatures of 21 - 27 ºC (69.8 - 80.6 ºF) in a humid environment such as a covered takeout container. When the seedlings are well rooted and have developed spines, remove the lid to allow humidity to decrease. Seedlings should not be exposed to strong direct sun.

Pups may be removed when they are approximately 1/3 the size of the parent plant. They should be allowed to form callus in a dry place before planting.

== Gallery ==
In habitat in Nuevo León, Mexico

Closeup of flower

Closeup of fruits

Growing with Thelocactus bicolor in Coahuila, Mexico
