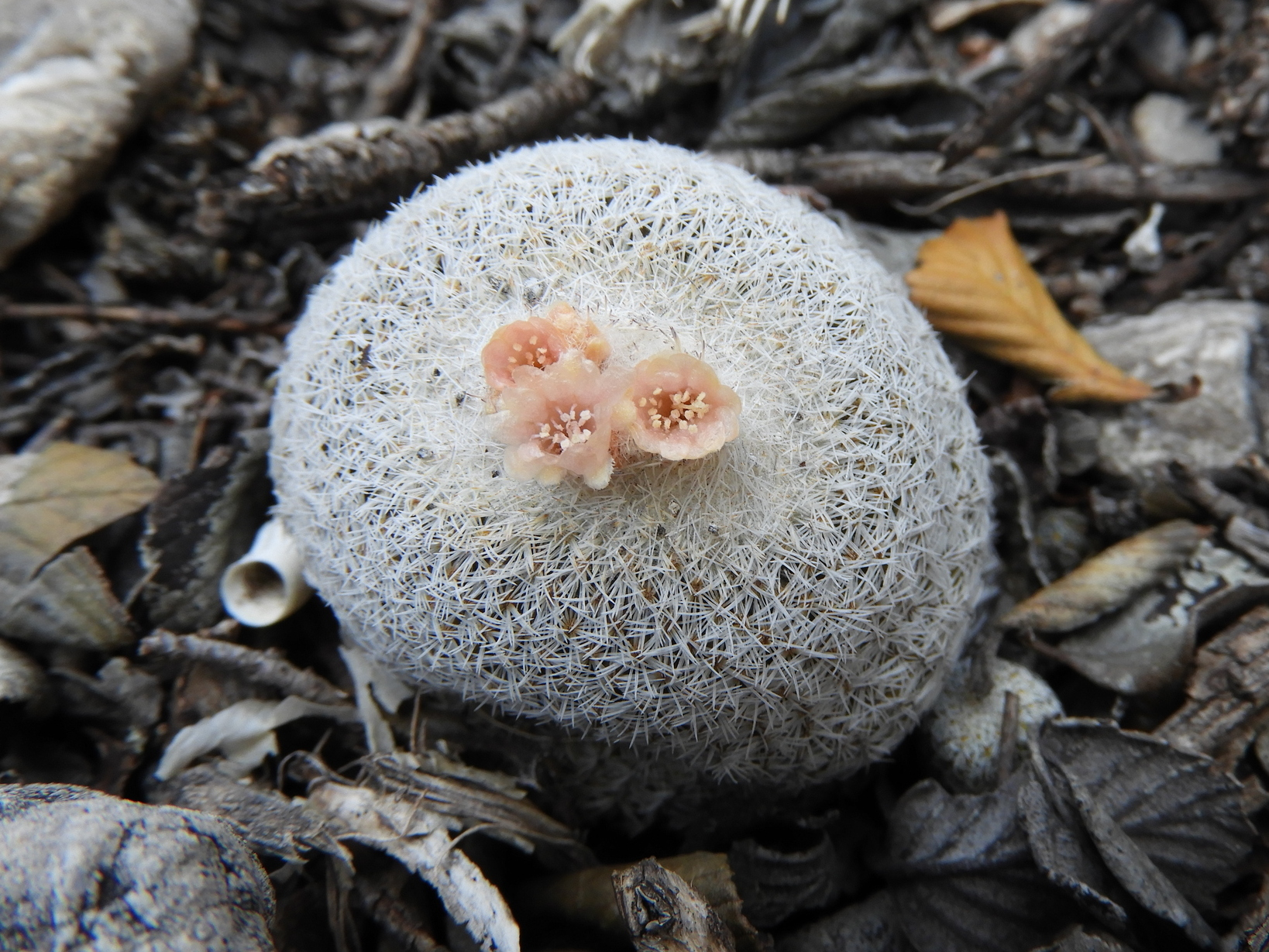

Conservation status
- Apparently Secure (NatureServe)

- Least Concern (IUCN 3.1)

Scientific classification
- Kingdom: Plantae
- Clade: Embryophytes
- Clade: Tracheophytes
- Clade: Spermatophytes
- Clade: Angiosperms
- Clade: Eudicots
- Order: Caryophyllales
- Family: Cactaceae
- Subfamily: Cactoideae
- Genus: Epithelantha
- Species: E. micromeris

Binomial name
- Epithelantha micromeris (Engelm.) F.A.C.Weber ex Britton & Rose

= Epithelantha micromeris =

Species of cactus

Epithelantha micromeris is a button cactus in the genus Epithelantha, found in Arizona, New Mexico, Texas and northeast Mexico. It is characterized by its white-grey spines growing on a globular shaped stem. The density of its white spines give it the illusion of being completely grey, making it very difficult to see the green color beneath. It grows to be 1–5 cm tall, and roughly 2–4 cm in diameter. E. micromeris produces small, pink-white flowers, often considered to be some of the smallest of the cacti. These flowers give way to a bright red, cylindrical fruit which contains several black seeds and also is edible.

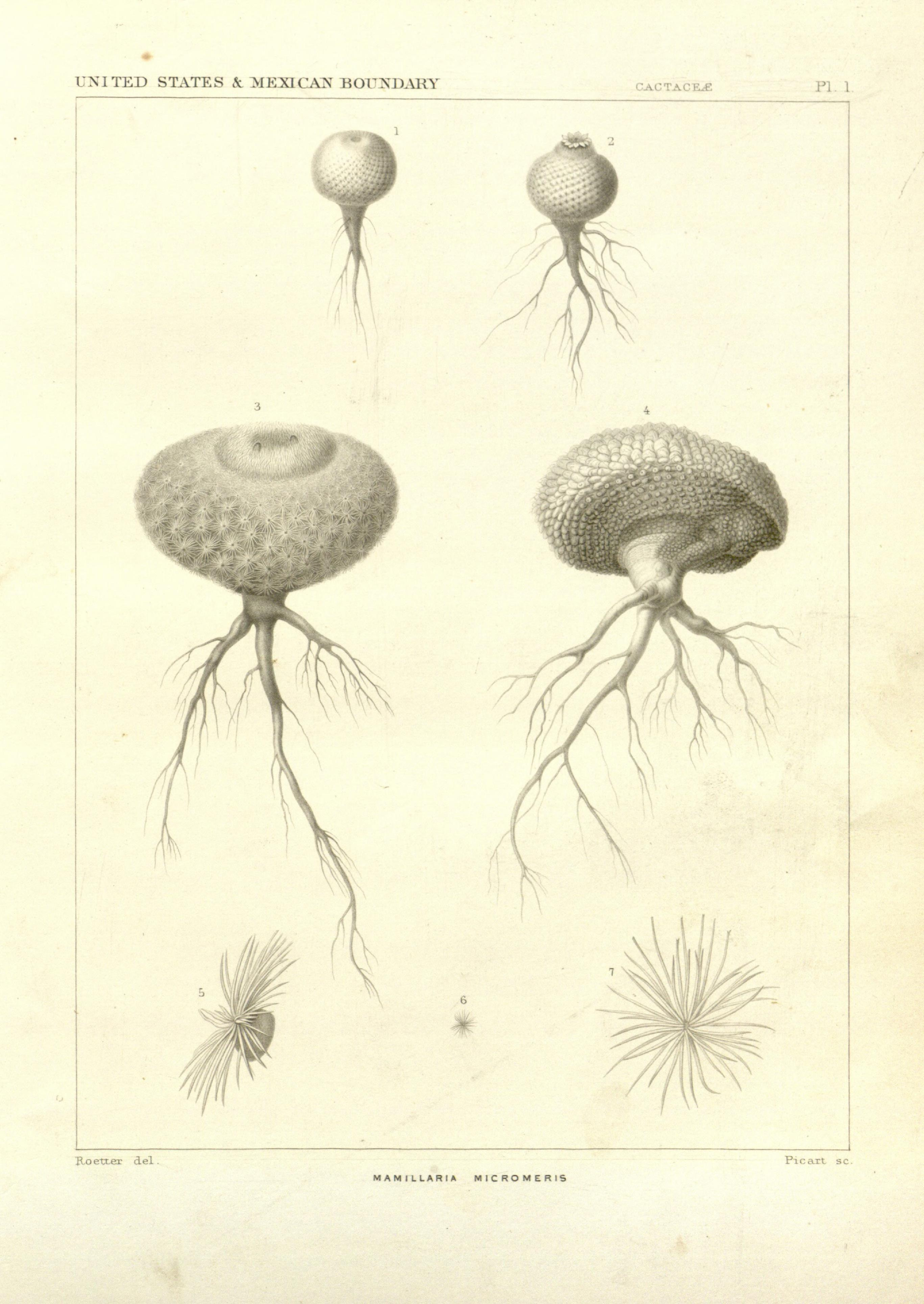
Illustration detailing plant.
