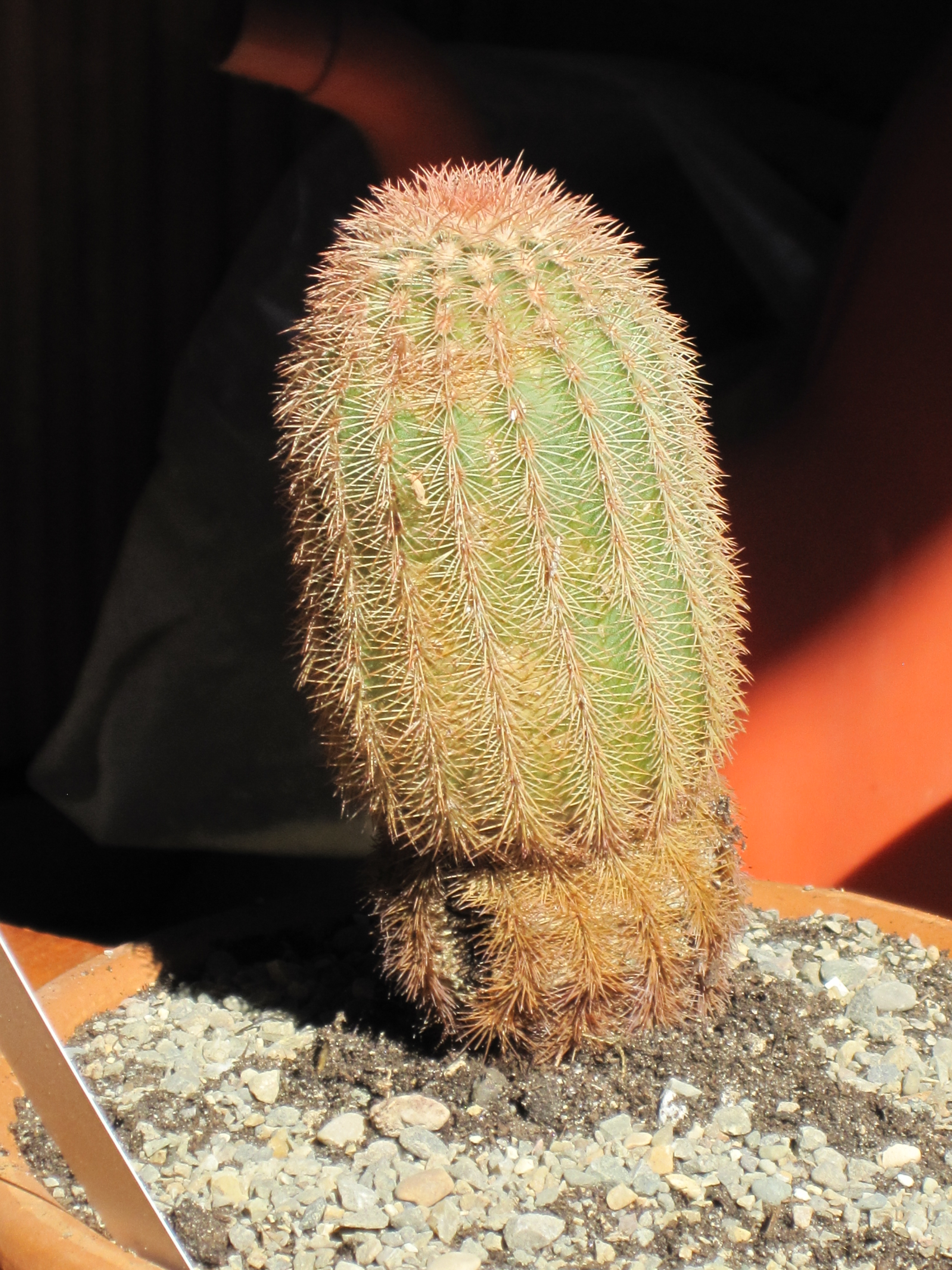

Conservation status
- Least Concern (IUCN 3.1)

Scientific classification
- Kingdom: Plantae
- Clade: Tracheophytes
- Clade: Angiosperms
- Clade: Eudicots
- Order: Caryophyllales
- Family: Cactaceae
- Subfamily: Cactoideae
- Genus: Echinocereus
- Species: E. pectinatus

Binomial name
- Echinocereus pectinatus (Scheidw.) Engelm., 1848

Synonyms
- Cereus pectinatus (Scheidw.) Engelm. 1849; Echinocactus pectinatus Scheidw. 1838; Echinopsis pectinata (Scheidw.) J.H.Fennell 1843

= Echinocereus pectinatus =

Species of cactus

Echinocereus pectinatus is a species of hedgehog cactus.

== Description ==
Echinocereus pectinatus is an upright, spherical to cylindrical cactus, typically solitary, growing 8 to 35 cm (3.1 to 13.8 in) long and 3 to 13 cm (1.2 to 5.1 in) in diameter. The plant is covered in comb-shaped thorns forming white and pink zones. It has 12 to 23 blunt ribs with dense, elliptical, white felted areoles about 3 mm (0.12 in) long. The 12 to 30 radial spines are comb-shaped, slightly bent back, 5 to 15 mm (0.20 to 0.59 in) long, and tinted whitish to pink. The 1 to 5 central spines range from yellowish to pink to brownish and are 1 to 25 mm (0.039 to 0.984 in) long. The funnel-shaped flowers are 5 to 15 cm (2.0 to 5.9 in) in diameter, deep pink, and appear on the side of the trunk. The flower tube has white tomentose thorns on the outside. The round to elliptical purple fruits are fleshy and thorny.

=== Subspecies ===
There are three accepted subspecies:

Image	Name	Distribution
	Echinocereus pectinatus subsp. pectinatus	N. Mexico
	Echinocereus pectinatus subsp. rutowiorum W.Blum	Mexico (Chihuahua)
	Echinocereus pectinatus subsp. wenigeri (L.D.Benson) W.Blum & Rutow	Texas to Mexico (Chihuahua, Coahuila)

== Distribution ==
Found in the Mexican states of Aguascalientes, Chihuahua, Coahuila, Durango, Guanajuato, Nuevo León, San Luis Potosí, Sonora, Tamaulipas, Zacatecas, and in the south-western US (New Mexico and Texas) at elevations of 400 to 1900 meters.

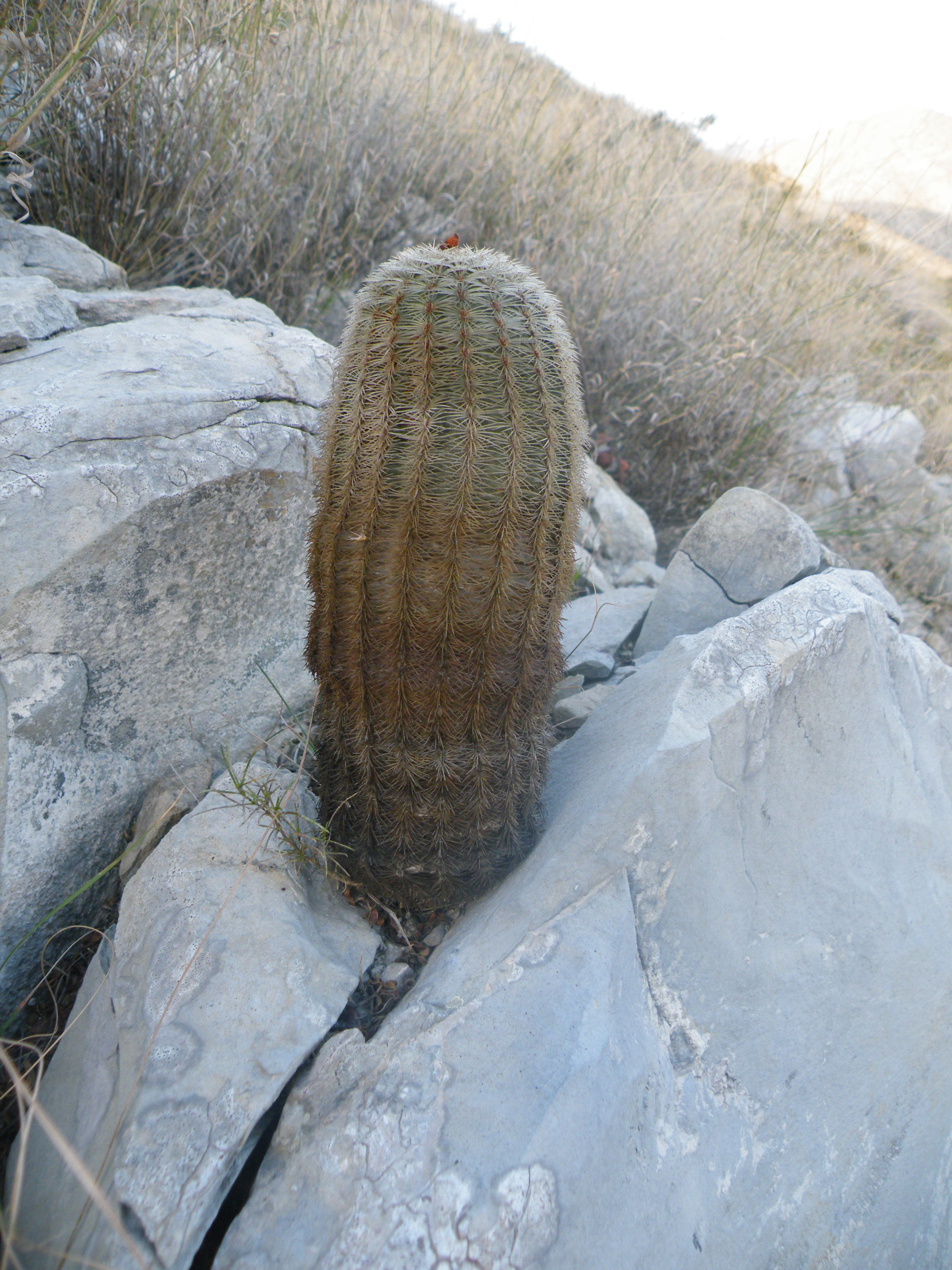
Plant growing in habitat in Mina, Nuevo Leon

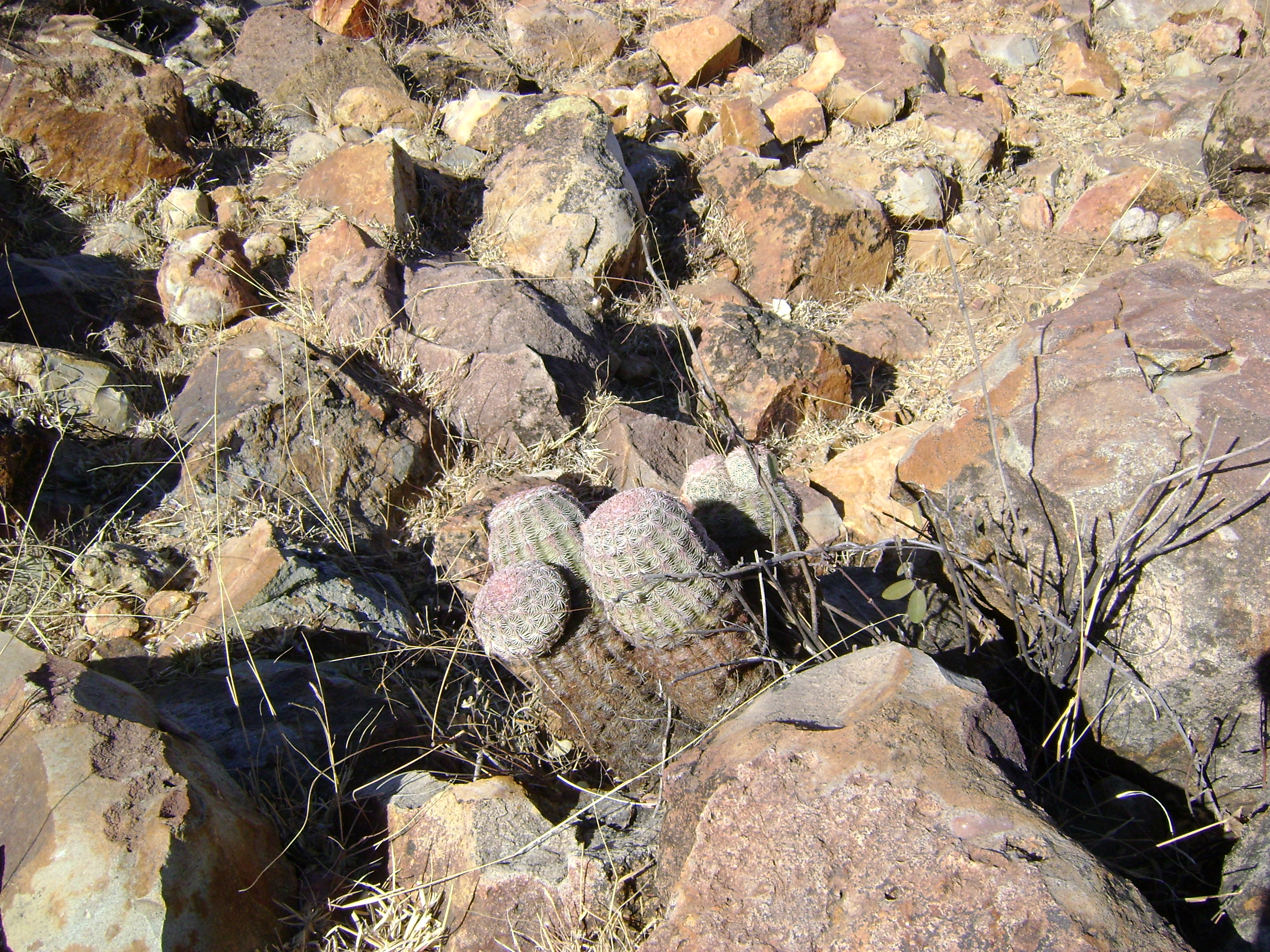
Habitat in Rio Nazas, Durango

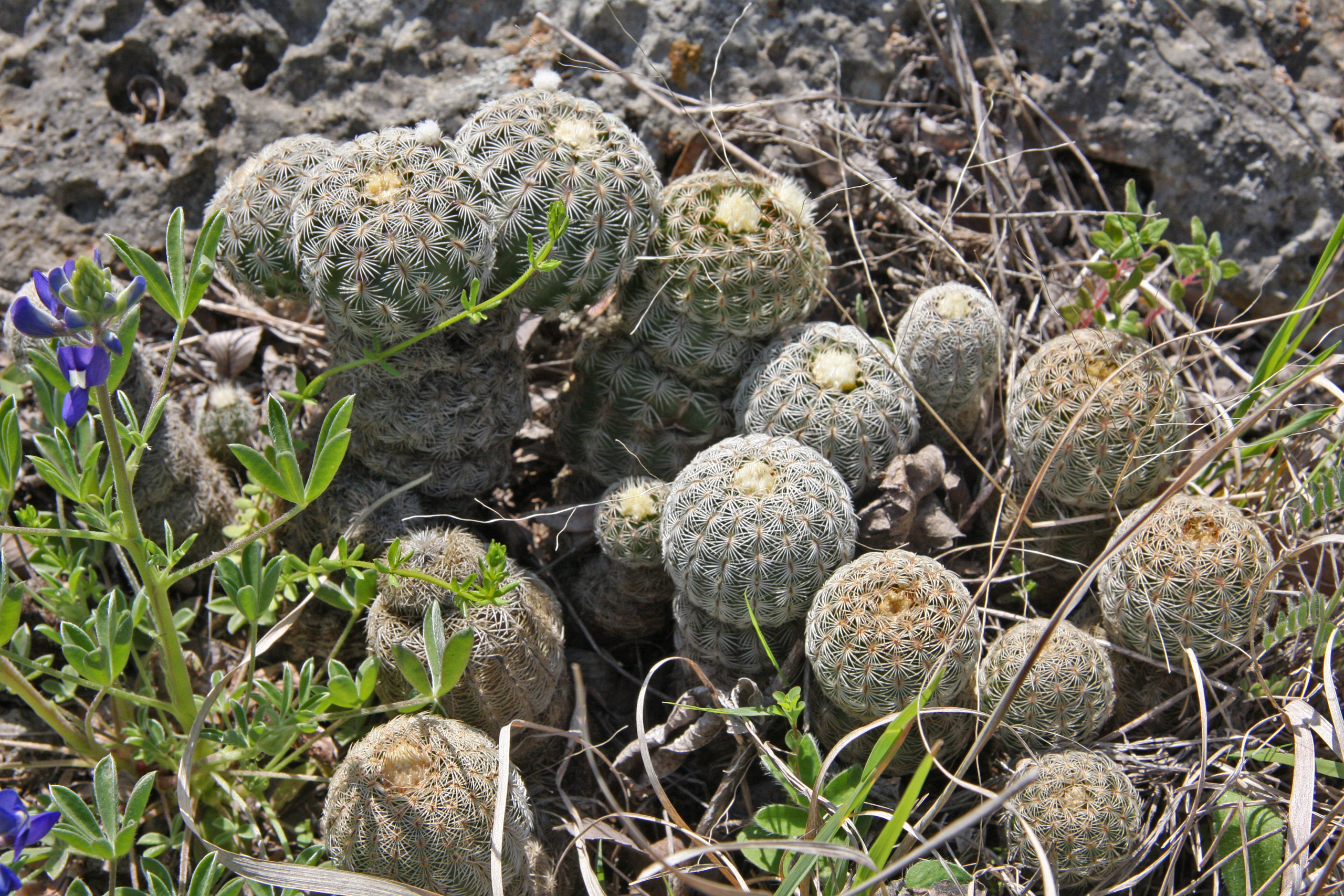
Plant growing in Lady Bird Johnson Wildflower Center, Austin Texas.

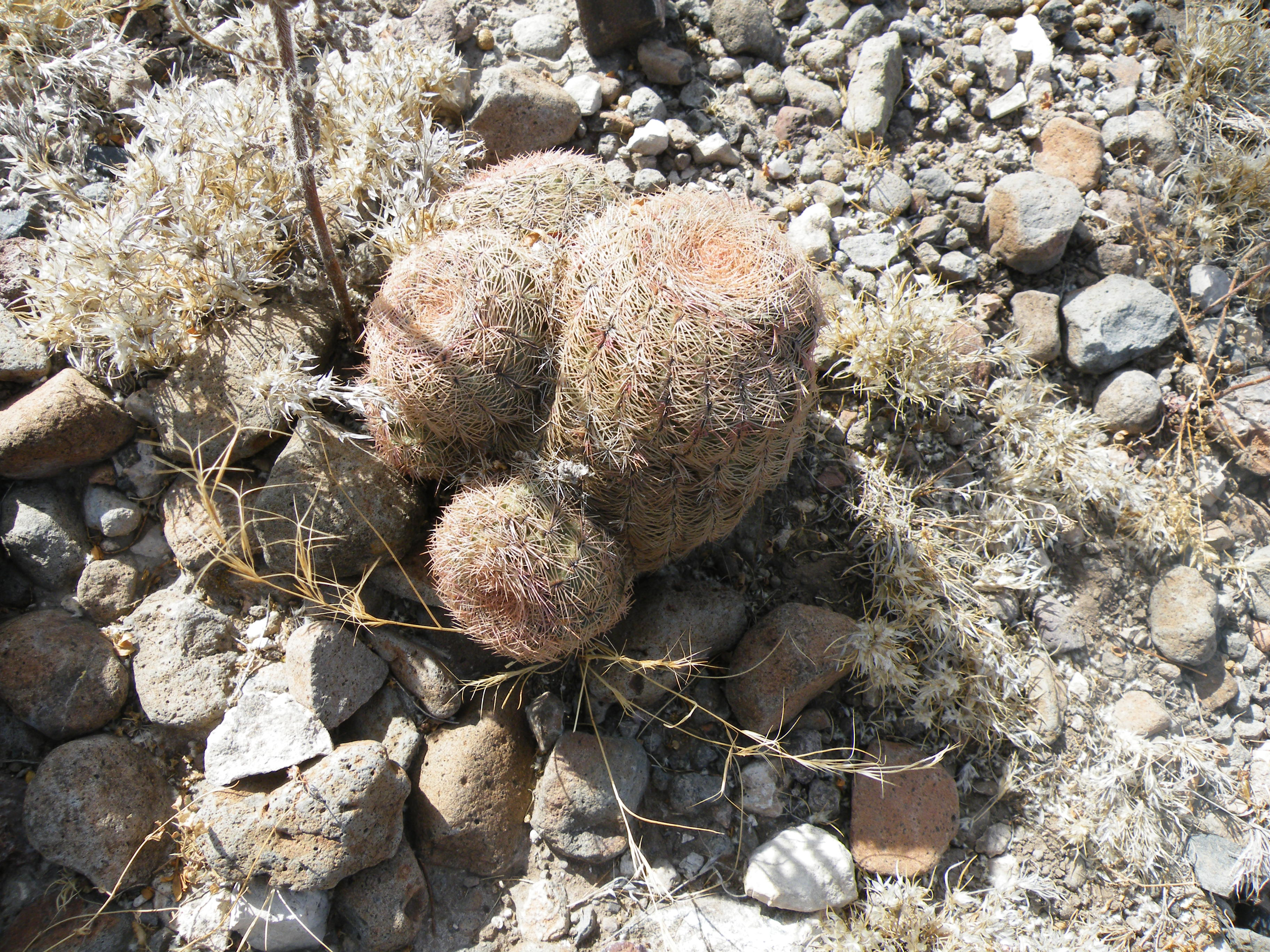
Plant growing 56 km South of Estacion Vanegas, San Luis Potosí

== Taxonomy ==
First described in 1838 by Michael Joseph François Scheidweiler as Echinocactus pectinatus, the species was reclassified by George Engelmann into the genus Echinocereus in 1848. The specific epithet "pectinatus," meaning "combed" in Latin, refers to the arrangement of the thorns.
