= Big Bend (Texas) =

Geographic region in the western part of Texas, US

Coordinates: 30°0′0″N 103°0′0″W

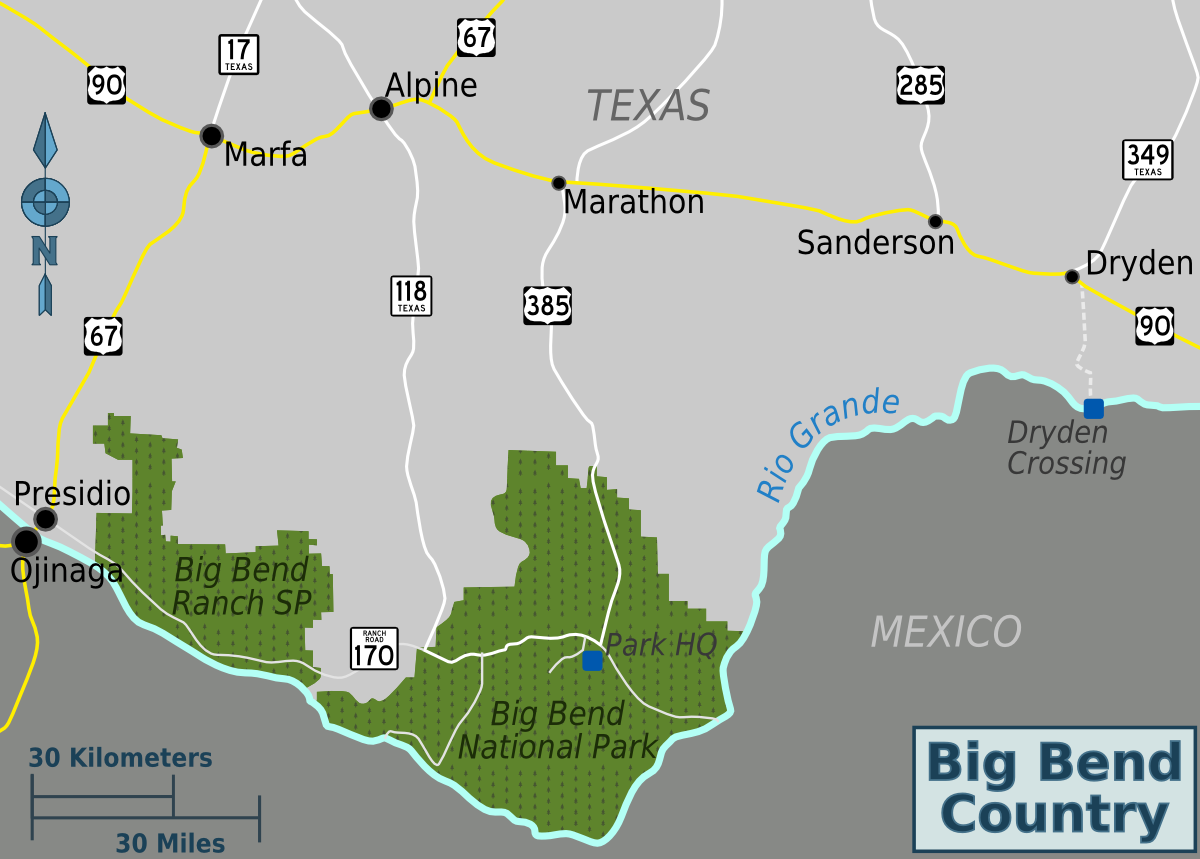
Big Bend area map

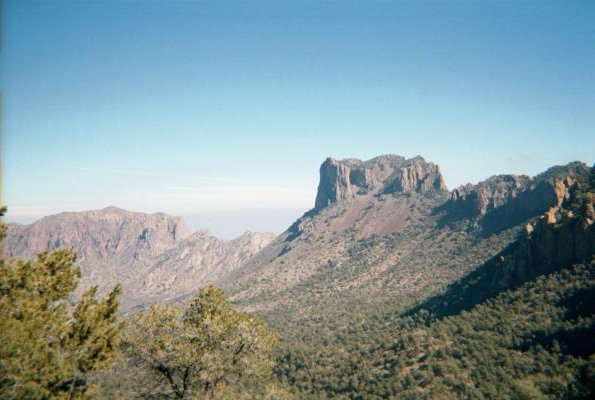
Casa Grande is a prominent peak in the Chisos Mountains of the Big Bend area of west Texas. The view is from the Pinnacles Trail in Big Bend National Park.

The Big Bend is part of the Trans-Pecos region in southwestern Texas, United States along the border with Mexico, north of the prominent bend in the Rio Grande for which the region is named. Here the Rio Grande passes between the Chisos Mountains in Texas and the Sierra Madre Oriental in Mexico as it changes from running east-southeast to north-northeast. The region covers three counties: Presidio to the west, Brewster to the east, and Jeff Davis to the north.

The region is rugged, sparsely populated Chihuahua Desert, including the Chisos Mountains, Chinati Mountains, and the Davis Mountains. The region has well over 1 million acres (4,000 km^{2}) of public lands, including Big Bend National Park (801,163 acres) Big Bend Ranch State Park (300,000 acres), Black Gap Wildlife Management Area (103,000 acres) and Chinati Mountains State Natural Area (39,000 acres) along the north side of the Rio Grande. It is also the home of the McDonald Observatory. In Mexico, adjacent areas of protected lands on the south side of the Rio Grande include the Cañón de Santa Elena Flora and Fauna Protection Area (ca. 511,508 acres), Ocampo Flora and Fauna Protection Area (ca. 850,630 acres), and the Maderas del Carmen Flora and Fauna Protection Area (ca. 514,920 acres).

The largest towns in the region are Alpine, Presidio, Marfa, Sanderson, Terlingua, and Marathon. The counties are Presidio, Jeff Davis, Brewster, Pecos, and Terrell.

== See also ==
- List of geographical regions in Texas
- Balmorhea State Park
- Trans-Pecos
