= Environmental impacts of the Mexico–United States border =

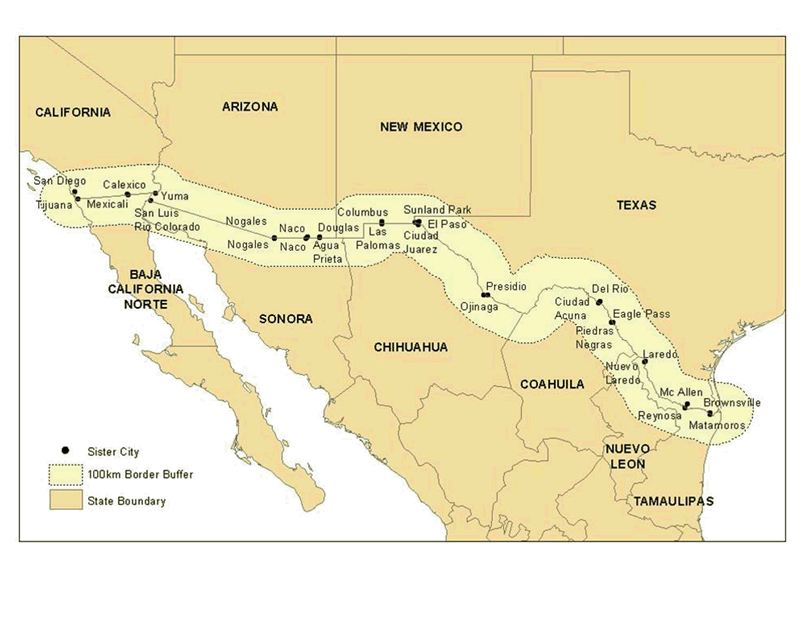
Mexico–United States boundary illustrating neighboring cities, states, and buffer zones.

The environmental impacts of the Mexico–United States border are numerous, including the disposal of hazardous waste, increase of air pollution, threats to essential water resources, and ecosystem fragmentation.

== History ==
The Mexico–United States border consists of a continental boundary of 1,954 mi. This border region is composed of diverse terrains in which various species, peoples, and indigenous tribes have made their homes. Through the decades, both countries have attributed to the increase in population growth, manufacturing corporations, and fragmentation of land due to border policy changes which contribute to environmental disparities between these neighboring borders.

== Policy framework ==
=== La Paz Agreement ===
On August 14, 1983, at La Paz, Baja California Sur, the United States and Mexico entered into the United States–Mexico Agreement on Cooperation for the Protection and Improvement of the Environment in the Border Area, known as the La Paz Agreement.

The agreement aims to protect and conserve the environment along the border. The agreement sets forth the responsibilities of both parties to prevent and control air, water, and land pollution in the border area. This agreement is made in accordance to each country's laws. The agreement entails that both parties must take responsibility for their border area and have the right to raise concerns if one state's environmental hazards linger into the other. The agreement highlights that both countries have the responsibility of coordinating with one another in the creation of national programs, scientific and educational exchanges, environmental monitoring, environmental impact assessment, and periodic exchanges of information and data on pollution sources in their respective territory. The information collected is then exchanged between each country every year at an annual meeting. The host nation alternates between the two countries. The collection of data is at the expense of each country. In consensus with one another the countries can make any annex changes to the agreement. Either party may terminate the agreement at any time, with the withdrawal made effect after a sixty-day period.

Thirty years after it was signed, the La Paz Agreement "remains the keystone agreement for bilateral cooperation on environmental protection in the border zone."

=== International Boundary and Water Commission (IBWC) ===
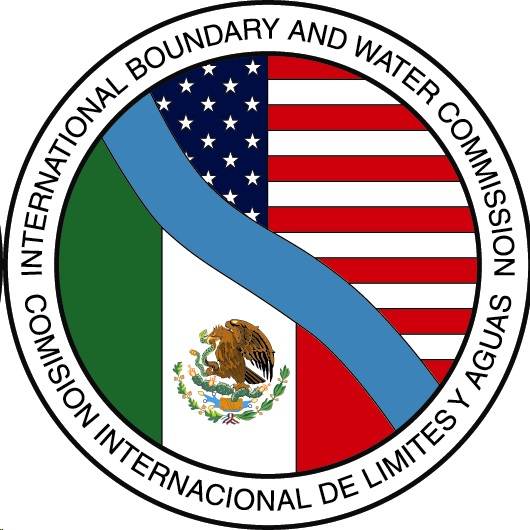
US-Mexico Water Treaty

The International Boundary and Water Commission (IBWC) is an extension of the International Boundary Commission (IBC) that was established in 1889. In 1944 the IBC extended its responsibilities by including water regulations and treaties which gave it its new name and new responsibilities (see Treaty relating to the utilization of waters of the Colorado and Tijuana Rivers and of the Rio Grande). This commission has two sections: one belonging to the United States located in El Paso, Texas, and the other to Mexico with its location in Ciudad Juárez, Chihuahua.

The IBWC's main focus is on the sanitation, distribution, and flood control over natural river waters and the distribution of boundaries between the U.S. and Mexican borders. The treaties and agreements have an in-depth focus on the water distribution of the Rio Grande, Colorado River, Tijuana River, Santa Cruz River, and other water components that flow into these rivers. These water masses must be maintained by both parties at each countries own expense. The IBWC also protects lands along the river from floods by levee and flood-way projects. Each country expanded their IBWC departments to have organizations within their department for deterring floods, pollution, and waste from these masses of water. Such departments include treatment plants, dams, levee systems, emergency departments, data collecting departments, and field offices.

Robert J. McCarthy, writing in the Water Law Review, states that the IBWC, has become an anachronism in which there is lack of oversight, regulation, and distribution of the natural resources between both countries. He makes his claims based on empirical research and data he collects from employees, water data collected, and legal structure within the IBWC sections both in the U.S. and Mexico. He claims that this system is uni-polar and the policies are in favor of the U.S. leading to unequal disparities for Mexico.

=== EPA policy ===
According to the Environmental Protection Agency's agenda, their main priority is to reduce the concentrations of particulate matter PM10 and PM2.5 along the border. In their most recent program, designed to be executed by 2020, their main focus has shifted to air pollution. This shift was caused to empirical data and information exchanged by both countries in their 2012 annual review.

The Border 2012 Program was the third bi-national agreement adopted under the La Paz Agreement of 1983. Border 2012 was initiated in April 2003 by the United States Environmental Protection Agency (EPA) and Mexico's Secretaría de Medio Ambiente y Recursos Naturales (SEMARNAT). The program completed over 400 projects using a community-based approach that prioritized the most serious environmental and public health concerns reported by residents and workers along the shared border region.

Most of the projects funded by Border 2012 were designed to remedy issues specific to a community. Other projects were completed or applied to issues that affected multiple communities. A wide breadth of creativity in addressing environmental and health concerns went into the achievements of the individual communities. One such example consists of the students and faculty of Autonomous University in Ciudad Juárez who crafted spray-paint cans that are better for the environment than the outdated spray cans previously used in the auto industry. Borderwide projects made huge achievements in areas such as scrap tire removal, providing safe drinking water systems and connecting homes to wastewater facilities, government collection of unused pesticides and agro-chemicals, improved emergency response and readiness in case of an environmental disaster, created coordinated binational responses in the event of an emergency along the border, community cleanups and solid waste removal from various waterways on both sides of the border, properly removing or recycling e-waste in U.S. and Mexico, and took inventories of greenhouse gas emissions (GHE).

=== Customs & Border Protection Environmental Policy ===
U.S. Customs and Border Protection is charged with border management and control in the United States. One of CBP's many functions is to integrate environmental stewardship in accordance to the National Environmental Policy Act (NEPA) of 1969. This act ensures that CBP evaluates all environmental hazards that can affect the ecosystem, endangered species, or indigenous tribes along the border. Environmental hazards must be tested when, "planning projects; leasing, purchasing, constructing, operating, maintaining, or decommissioning equipment, facilities, or tactical infrastructure; and revising and implementing operational programs and activities" along the border. Along with tests, CBP must also reach out to stake holders, non-government organizations, state, and indigenous tribes to maximize and sustain potential outcomes.

=== Secure Fence Act ===
The Secure Fence Act of 2006 was passed providing for the construction of 700 miles (1,100 km) of high-security fencing. This act was processed under the Bush Administration in attempts to complete the construction of the United States–Mexico barrier.

The fencing built under the 2006 act caused habitat fragmentation that affected wildlife, including endangered animals. A 2011 study published in the peer-reviewed journal Diversity and Distributions determined that the habitat fragmentation determined that "small range size is associated with a higher risk of extinction, and for some species, the barriers reduce range by as much as 75%." The study identified the most "at risk" species as the Arroyo toad (Anaxyrus californicus), California red-legged frog (Rana draytonii), black-spotted newt (Notophthalmus meridionalis), Pacific pond turtle (Clemmys marmorata), and jaguarundi (Puma yagouaroundi). The study also identified coastal California, coastal Texas, and the Madrean Sky Island Archipelago of southeastern Arizona and southwest New Mexico as the three border regions where the barrier posed the greatest risk to wildlife. In Texas, for example, "the border barrier affects 60% to 70% of the habitat in the South Texas Wildlife Refuge Complex, which includes the Laguna Atascosa, Lower Rio Grande Valley, and Santa Ana National Wildlife Refuges."

=== Executive Order 13767 ===
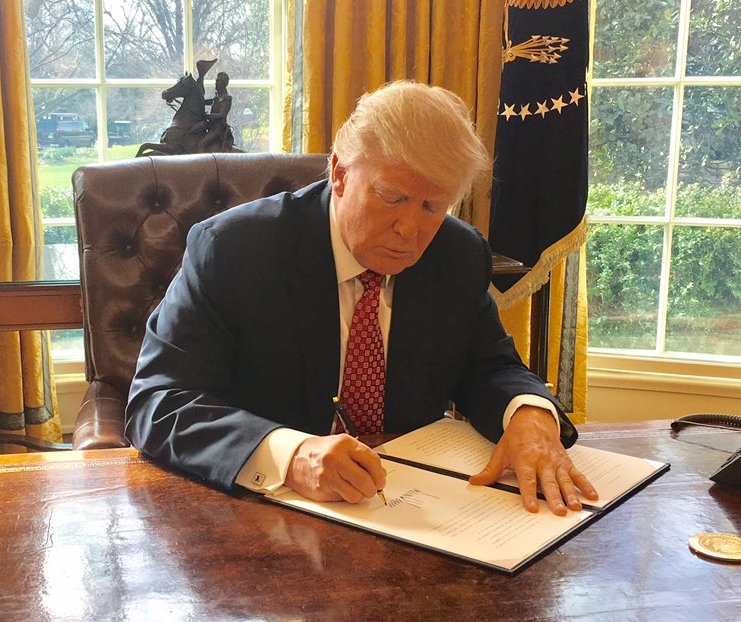
President Trump signing Executive Orders

On January 25, 2017, President Donald Trump issued Executive Order 13767, directing construction of a border wall. Such a wall was not under construction, and Congress had not appropriated the funds to build such a wall. The construction of a border wall as envisioned in Trump's order would cause significant environmental damage, including habitat destruction and habitat fragmentation that would harm wildlife, including endangered species. Wall construction would also cause increased greenhouse gas emissions, contributing to climate change, due to the concrete manufacturing that would be required.

A 2017 study conducted by UNAM scientists found that more than 800 species, of which 140 are endangered, would be adversely affected if Trump's 2,000-mile-long border wall is built. The research concluded that the erection of "an impassable physical barrier placed into ecosystems" would "so disrupt patterns of migration as to cause a 'natural catastrophe.'" The bald eagle, grey wolf, armadillo and jaguar would be adversely affected. The wall would adversely affect even some bird species, such as the ferruginous pygmy owl, which "rarely flies higher than 4.5 feet off the ground."

In April 2017, the Center for Biological Diversity, an environmental group, and U.S. Representative Raúl M. Grijalva, the ranking Democratic member on the House Committee on Natural Resources filed a lawsuit in federal court in Tucson. In their complaint, Grijalva and the Center argue that the government's wall construction plans fail to comply with the National Environmental Policy Act, and seek to compel the government to carry out an environmental impact study and produce an environmental impact statement before building the wall. The lawsuit specifically seeks "to stop any work until the government agrees to analyze the impact of construction, noise, light and other changes to the landscape on rivers, plants and endangered species—including jaguars, Sonoran pronghorns and ocelots—and also on border residents".

In addition to the Center for Biological Diversity, a number of other wildlife advocacy and environmental organizations have opposed construction of a border wall. These include the grassroots Sierra Club, which has called Trump's wall proposal "expensive, ineffective and environmentally devastating" and noted that existing walls already "block wildlife migration, cause flooding and damage pristine wild lands, including wildlife refuges, wilderness areas, and national forests"; the Natural Resources Defense Council; and Panthera, which "opposes the construction of a border wall that would disturb the natural movement and dispersal patterns of wildlife."

== Impacts ==
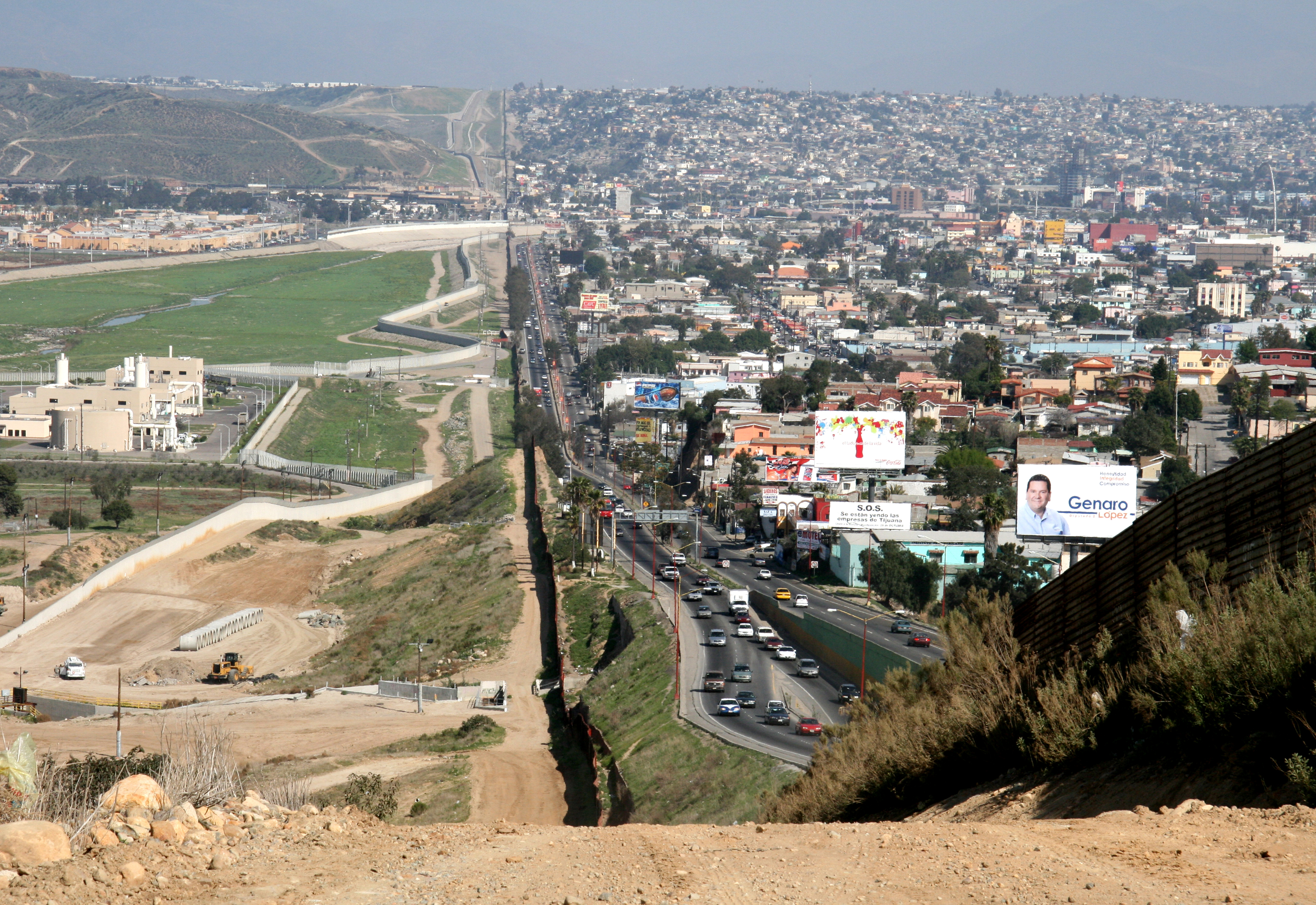
United States-Mexico border on the right highly industrialized border city of Tijuana, Mexico. On the left is San Diego, California's water treatment plant.

=== Toxic waste ===
Currently, the border has hazardous materials being transported across country lines. The La Paz Agreement, signed by Mexico and the United States in 1983, requires hazardous waste created by United States corporations to be transported back to the United States for disposal. However, due to the physical border wall and its effects the United States Environmental Protection Agency (EPA) reports that only 91 of the 600 manufacturing plants located along the Texas-Mexico border have returned hazardous waste to the United States since 1987.

Industries in U.S.-Mexico border towns often illegally dump or burn wastes, causing water and air pollution and other forms of environmental degradation along the border. These industries are largely known as maquiladoras. The maquiladoras have been tested and were found to create air, soil and water pollution through their activities. Also, these industries are potential sites for industrial accidents. In 2013, a Juárez maquila killed eight workers and caused injuries to many others.

A 2003 report by the National Environmental Justice Advisory Council to the EPA noted that: "Abandonment of hazardous wastes has been a serious problem because of the apparent ease with which responsible parties have been able to avoid enforcement actions by crossing the border. While cooperation between U.S. and Mexican enforcement authorities should theoretically prevent such occurrences, complaints about abandoned or unremediated sites and the failure to hold the responsible parties accountable have been persistent." Among the more infamous border hazardous-waste sites named in the report were Metales y Derivados, an abandoned lead battery recycling plant, and Alco Pacifico facility, both in Tijuana, Baja California, Mexico.

=== Water ===
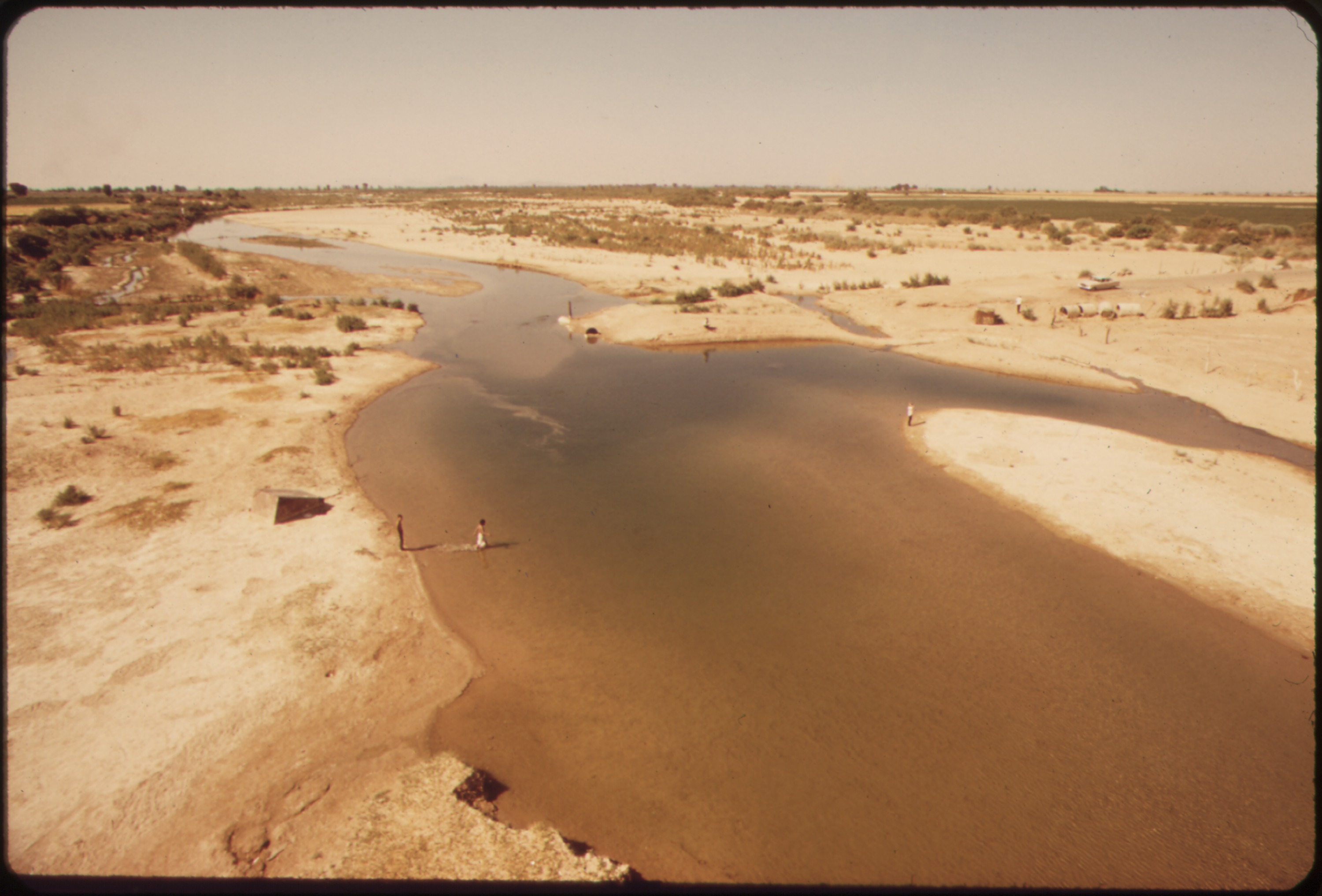
Colorado river at Mexican border

The border region poses major threats in losing essential water resources. Aquifers in particular are primary water sources for the bordering states which have been severely impacted by these water deficits. An estimate suggests that there are around 16 to 36 aquifers between these bordering countries. Due to mass climate change, droughts, and large population growths these aquifers are drying out. By year 2025, the Bolson Hueco Aquifer is expected to be depleted, this aquifer is a primary source of water for El Paso and Ciudad Juárez. This in turn, has forced the bordering cities to rely on water from the Rio Grande. Consequently, residents living in the downriver cities east of El Paso, (whose primary source of water is the Rio Grande for uses such as cooking, bathing, and drinking) have been affected by the new distributions of water.

Large water boundaries such as Rio Grande and the Santa Cruz river create natural borders between both nations. As noted in Executive Order 13767's text, the "'Southern border' shall mean the contiguous land border between the United States and Mexico, including all points of entry." This would require the fragmentation of these rivers, which could cut the flow of water and wildlife between the two nations. The construction of this wall also questions the future of treaties signed between both nations such as the International Boundary and Water Commission and La Paz Agreement.

=== Air pollution ===
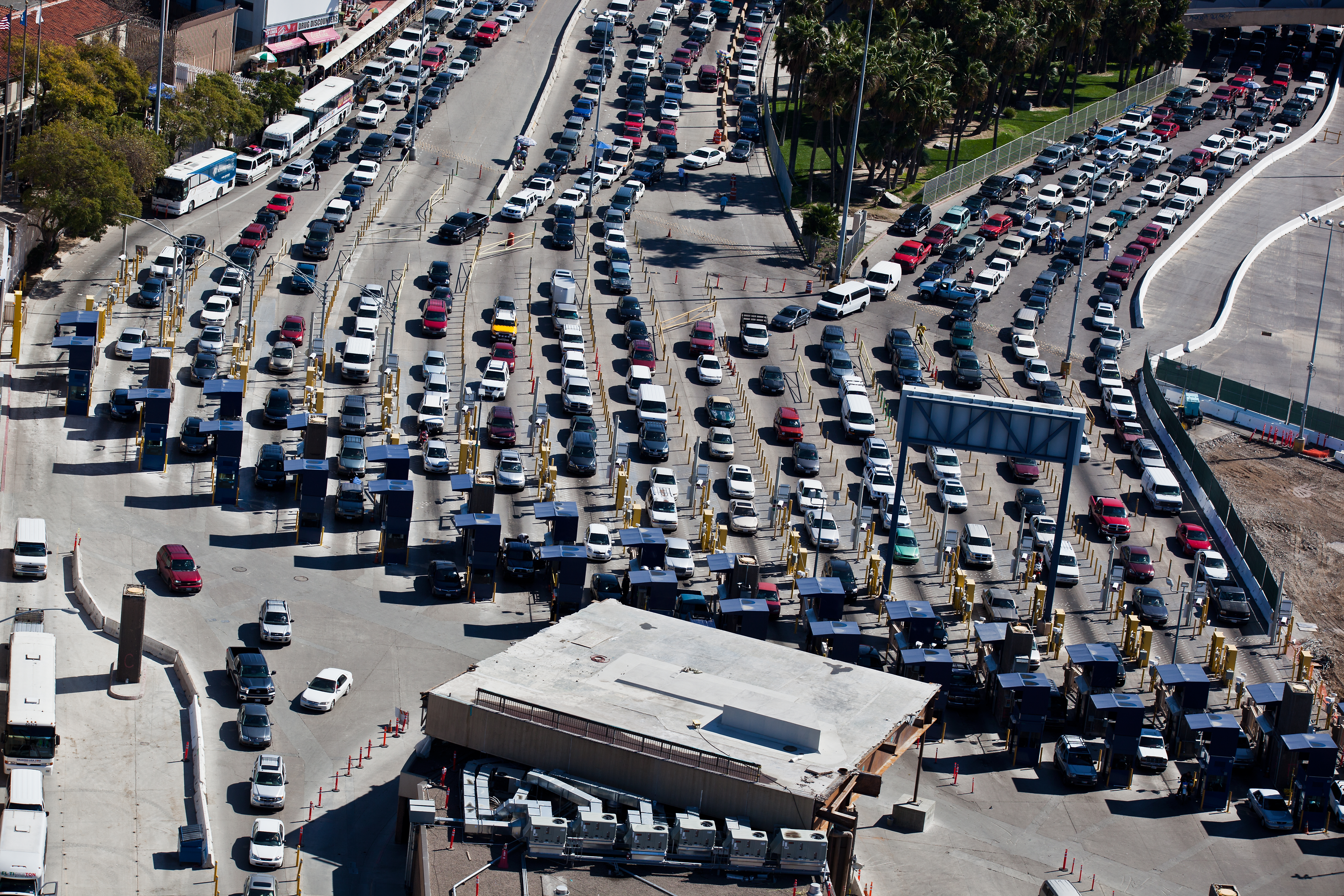
Idling vehicles for long periods of time at border entries are significant in contributing the poor air quality along the border.

Air pollution along the US-Mexico border is created through various outputs including vehicular emissions and industrial emissions. According to data found on the Bureau of Transportation Statistics in 2016 about 87,462,517 vehicles (Trucks, Personal Vehicles, Busses, and Trains) went through the border in the year 2016.

According to Christoph Meinrenken, an associate research scientist at Columbia University's Earth Institute, a 1,000-mile (1,600-kilometer) wall would require an estimated 275 million cubic feet of concrete. It would release as much as 1.9 million metric tons of carbon dioxide into the atmosphere.

=== Ecosystem fragmentation ===
There are a variety of ecosystems ranging from deserts and mountains to natural waterways along the US-Mexico border. The two deserts along the border region are fragile due to small disturbances or changes impacting plant and animal life in significant ways. Ecosystems provide wide services such as: "...food, fiber, regulation of clean water and climate stability, physical protection from extreme events, including flooding and drought, pest mitigation, recreation, and educational and inspirational opportunities that are vital to the prosperity, safety and well-being of both the U.S. and Mexican public".

Along the U.S.-Mexico border the ecosystem no longer functions in these patterns; instead it is going through degradation. In part degradation is caused by poor management of agricultural runoff, sewage waste contributing to coastal "dead zones", water withdrawals related to agriculture, mining, and rapid urbanization, military activities, and border enforcement.

The Lower Rio Grande Valley National Wildlife Refuge and the Sabal Palm Audubon Center and Sanctuary are important ecological areas along the border.

=== Endangered species ===
According to the U.S. Fish and Wildlife Service, more than 100 species between California and Texas are listed as threatened and endangered under the Endangered Species Act. Jesse Lasky, an assistant professor of biology at Penn State University, led a study on the impact of barriers published in the journal Diversity and Distributions in 2011. The study's main conclusion was that the "new barriers would increase the number of species at risk". In New Mexico, for example, such a wall would prevent rare northern jaguars from entering suitable habitat in the southern part of the state from Mexico. In 2021, an endangered Mexican gray wolf was stopped from crossing from New Mexico into Mexico by a section of border wall.

== Impacts on people ==
=== Indigenous communities ===
The traditional homelands of various indigenous people's were split in two by the 1848 Treaty of Guadalupe Hidalgo and 1853 Gadsden Purchase. This split the traditional homelands of various federally recognized tribes such as the Kumeyaay, Pai, Cocopah, O'odham, Yaqui, Apache, and Kickapoo peoples as well as unrecognized indigenous groups and communities along the Mexico-United States Border.

Construction of the Mexico-United States Border Wall has effected indigenous communities in both countries in a myriad of ways both through the alteration of the physical natural environment and the marginalization of indigenous communities rights, agency, and autonomy. These groups proximity to the border and intrinsic connection to the land in terms of historic, cultural, and spiritual identity, has resulted in the continued struggle for indigenous community advocacy for humanitarian welfare and against indigenous environmental injustice.

Indigenous communities and U.S. border tribes experience negative impacts on their environment. The Border XXI Program Report conducted between 1996 and 2000 discussed issues the 27 federally recognized tribes face on their environment. "Off-reservation activity like the congestion of traffic, extraction of resources, and the unregulated burning and dumping of hazardous waste" is reported to have led to air pollution on reservations. The interconnectedness of rivers and streams along the border were noted to have been contaminated and to have impacted the water quality that Indigenous communities rely on.

The Tohono O'odham Nation is a tribal group composed of six indigenous villages living on the border region between Mexico and the United States. The 2017 executive order passed by President Trump caused concern upon initialization among Indigenous Tribes like the Tohono O'odham. Enforcement of Executive Order 13767 threatened creation of a physical separation that could impact cultural practices, as well as a symbolic separation of an ancestral connection.

Prior to implementation of Executive Order 13767 O'odham people reported facing heavy patrolling when traveling throughout their reservation. O'odham members that were citizens of Mexico faced the threat of detainment and deportation while accessing land with ancestral belonging.

After the implementation of Executive Order 13767, the U.S. Government Accountability Office ran a report of various impacts of border wall construction. One of the categories it reported on was cultural impacts. Members of the Tohono O'odham tribe were interviewed to understand how border wall construction impacted them. Members indicated damage done to multiple culturally significant sites. Monument Hill being one that holds significance for the tribe in being a site in which ancestral battles occurred. The report found that the process of extending a border patrol road led to site impairment. This site also served as a sacred ceremonial location. The saguaro cactus which is culturally significant to the tribe had difficulty surviving transplants for wall construction.

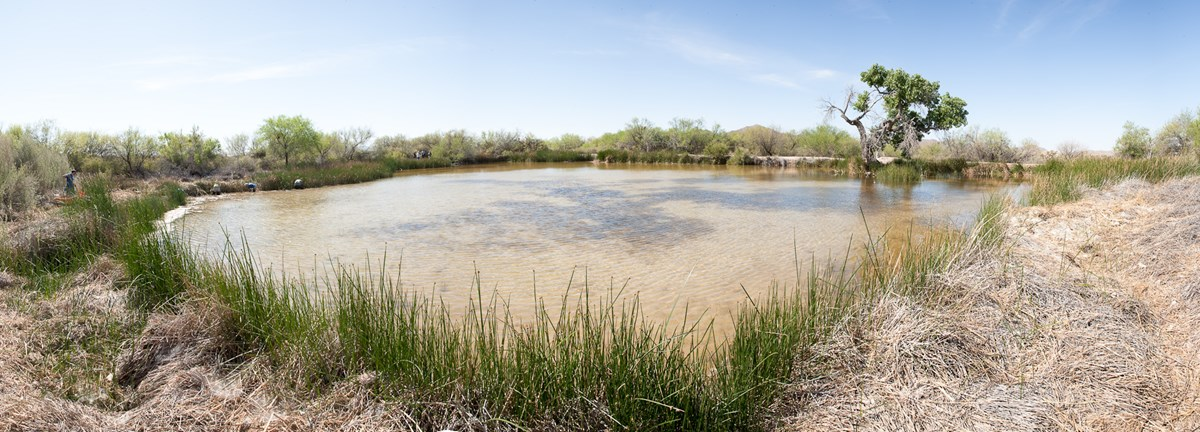
Quitobaquito Springs in Pima County, Arizona

Quitobaquito Springs is a sacred oasis to Tohono O'odham people located near the border. It is significant in being an area that was used for trade and cultural practices prior to an international border. It holds remains of O'odham ancestors and serves as a sacred cultural site. The Springs were harmed during initial stages of Executive Order 13767 in which proper environmental assessments were unaccomplished. Forced relocation of O'odham people to reservations put the springs at high risk of environmental depletion including loss of water and biodiversity because of the loss of human maintenance the site had for thousands of years. "According to Tohono O'odham Nation officials, contractors cleared a large area near the springs, destroying a burial site that the Tribe had sought to protect" whilst preparing for border wall construction. The southern region of the springs was cut across by the border wall construction and has been speculated to have decreased water content as a result.

Several other indigenous groups have advocated against the construction of and expansion of the Mexico-United States border wall. The Pascua Yaqui Nation have been working to regain tribal sovereignty and ease the border crossings in their tribal lands. Like the Tohono O'odham, the Pascua Yaqui have faced challenges due to the border's impact on their traditional way of life.

The Cocopah Indian tribe has been advocating against further construction of the border wall on its land near Yuma and near the Colorado River Delta citing it as a safety concern, barrier, and for its impact on native wildlife, vegetation and cultural practices.

The Lipan Apache have sought United Nations support and have fought an extensive legal battle with the US federal government alleging that the border walls construction discriminates against them for depriving them of their land and prohibiting their right to religious expression. They also expressed frustration at the abuse of power by the federal government for waiving through various environmental protection laws to bypass legal barriers to building or adding more to the wall in environmentally sensitive areas.

The Ysleta del Sur Pueblo Indians and Kickapoo have also advocated against the construction of and expansion of the Mexico-United States. In fact, both tribes have advocated alongside the Lipan Apache, Cocopah, Pascua Yaqui, Kumeyaay, and Tohono O'odham for its environmental and cultural impact on their communities ways of life.

=== U.S. residents ===
Mexican immigrants are primarily concentrated in the West and Southwest, and more than half live in California or Texas. In January, The Trump Administration made public a plan to pay for the wall with a 20% tariff on Mexican imports. The border states, mainly California and Texas, have the largest imports from Mexico in the country. According to the US Census, Texan imports of Mexican goods were worth more than $84 billion in 2015. Accordingly, Texas would pay $16.8 billion more for the same goods and services. This tariff would negatively impact United States citizens—especially those living in border areas.

As of 2010, there were about 15 million people living in border counties on both sides of the Mexico-U.S. borders, with nearly 7.2 million residents on the United States side. The influx of workers needed to secure the Southern border would be in the thousands. While this would increase the economies of these border towns for a short time, eventually real estate prices would rise. This increase in value would push out many current residents of border towns, which are historically lower in property value. The construction of the wall would negatively impact lower income communities along the border in the long run.

=== Mexican residents ===
In Mexico, Grineski, etal. formed a research analysis on the patterns of environmental injustice in Tijuana. The study found that residents who live closer to these border regent areas had higher levels of flame retardants. This study extracted blood serum from children living in close proximity to the Mexican-US border industrialized zones and to other children living in rural, suburb areas or near landfills. "Apart from that finding, patterns of environmental injustice in Tijuana found that children and recent migrants were most at risk to industrial hazards near their homes."

Important to note is the mortality rate of those attempting to illegally cross the border. Since 2006, when the Secure Fence Act was introduced, crossing mortalities have exponentially increased. In the last 15 years, around 3,600-5,100 people have been killed attempting to cross the border. By 2009, the risk of dying while crossing the border in Arizona was 17 times greater than it was a decade earlier, according to one analysis by the American Civil Liberties Union.

== See also ==
- Mexico–United States international park
