= Mexico–United States international park =

Proposed transboundary protected area

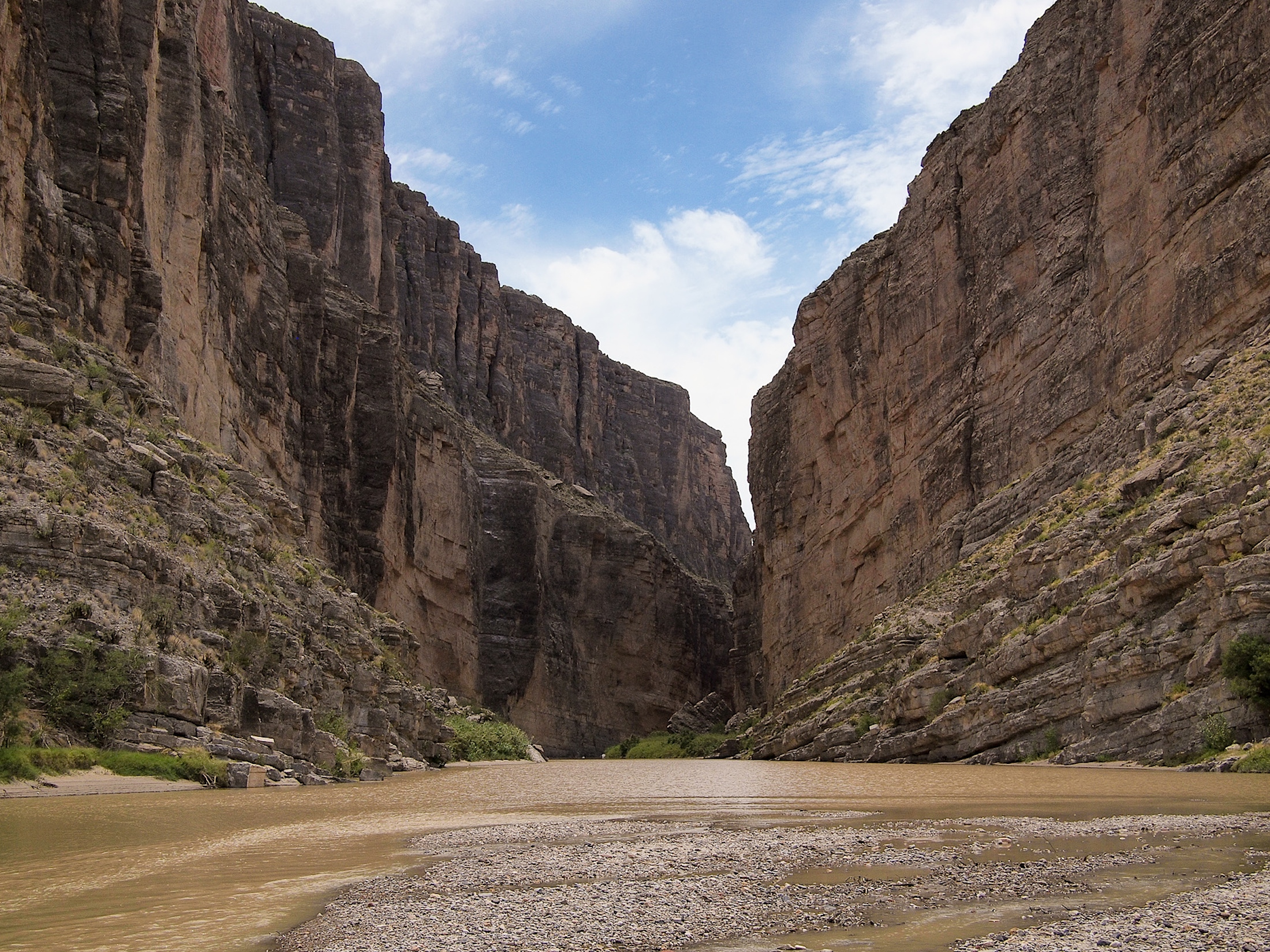
- The Rio Grande river in Big Bend National Park.
- Interactive map of Mexico–United States international park
- Type: Proposed bi-national park
- Coordinates: 29°11′35.61″N 102°55′25.1″W

The Mexico–United States international park, also known as El Carmen Big Bend Complex, is a proposed transboundary protected area straddling the part of the U.S.–Mexico boundary delineated by the Rio Grande. Proposed by U.S. President Franklin Delano Roosevelt to Mexican President Manuel Ávila Camacho in 1944, the goal remains unfulfilled. The proposed bi-national park is along a 268-mile stretch of the river, which is approximately 14% of the border between Mexico and the United States. It consists of 3 protected areas and parks in Texas and 4 in Mexico, which include Big Bend National Park, the Maderas del Carmen, Ocampo, and Cañón de Santa Elena flora and fauna protection areas, Monumento Río Bravo del Norte, Big Bend Ranch State Park, and Black Gap Management Wildlife Area. As it is a region of protected areas and parks, the El Carmen Big Bend Complex area is the habitat for many types of birds, mammals, plants, and insects. Due to this, the area is a prime spot for ecotourism for both the United States and Mexico along the border. Recent issues of increased border security and environmental concerns have emphasized the need for reopening the discussion, which is currently led by organizations such as the National Park Service in Big Bend National Park, the Sierra Club, and Rotary International.

== History ==
When you come to an area as remote and as beautiful as Big Bend, it truly changes your perception of what a border is and what a border can be. There is a line - the river in this case - that politically marks the boundaries of our two countries. But for a tourist, for a park ranger, for a conservationist, and for anyone who has visited this spectacular place, one thing is clear: what we share here – the seamless flow of nature across both banks of the river – is far stronger and far more enduring than what divides us.

— Anthony Wayne, U.S. Ambassador to Mexico, U.S., Mexico Announce Binational Cooperative Conservation Action Plan, Oct 24, 2011

We celebrate putting into actions a model of collaboration for transboundary conservation. The Big Bend-Rio Bravo Natural Area of Binational Interest is a model envisioned by our Presidents; it is a dream shared by many past generations; and a legacy for present and future ones. In sum, it is an example of the best our governments and people can pursue through cooperation and joint work.

— Juan Rafael Elvira Quesada, Environment and Natural Resources Secretary of Mexico, U.S., Mexico Announce Binational Cooperative Conservation Action Plan, Oct 24, 2011

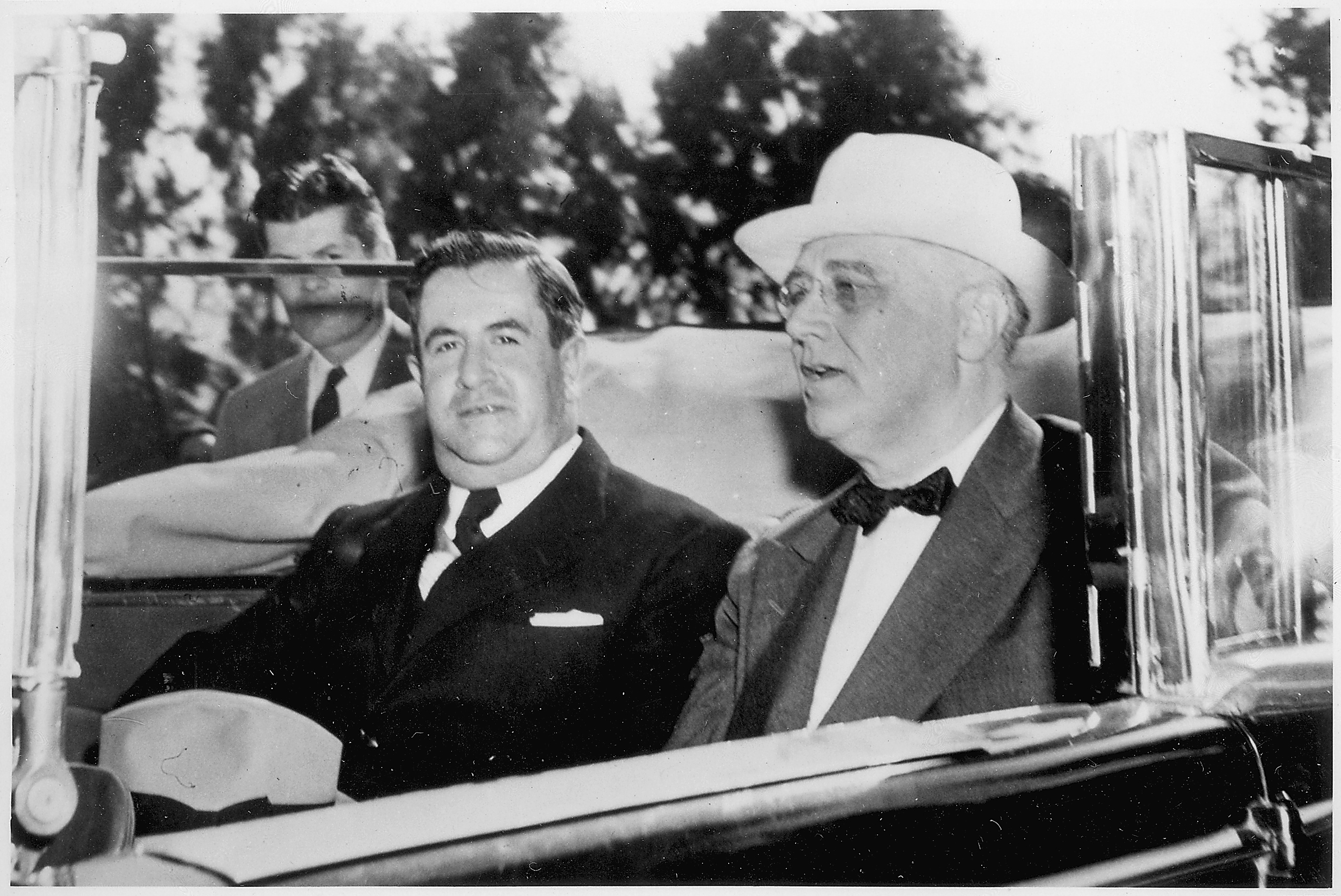
Camacho and Roosevelt in Monterrey, Mexico in 1943

Development of the Big Bend region began in 1933 when the Chamber of Commerce in Alpine, Texas commissioned a landscape architect to design an international park for the Big Bend region. Two years later, a U.S. Senator from Texas wrote to U.S. President Roosevelt proposing an international park overlapping the U.S.–Mexico border in this area, prompting the U.S. and Mexico to form a commission establishing Big Bend International Park. It was not until June 1944 that Big Bend National Park came into being. That same month, U.S. President F. D. Roosevelt wrote to Mexican President Manuel Ávila Camacho expressing a desire for the area on both sides of the Rio Grande to form one great international park. He wrote,

I do not believe this undertaking in the Big Bend will be complete until the entire park area ... on both sides of the Rio Grande, forms one great international park.

— Pres. Franklin Delano Roosevelt, message to Pres. Manuel Ávila Camacho, 1944

President Camacho agreed with Roosevelt's aim. After Roosevelt died, U.S. President Harry Truman resumed talks with Mexico, but in the 1950s, Mexican efforts stopped short of protecting the entire area envisioned, and talks stalled. J. B. Jackson, in his 1951 essay Chihuahua as We Might Have Been, argued for mutual co-operation to restored continuity between the ecosystems on either side of the border.

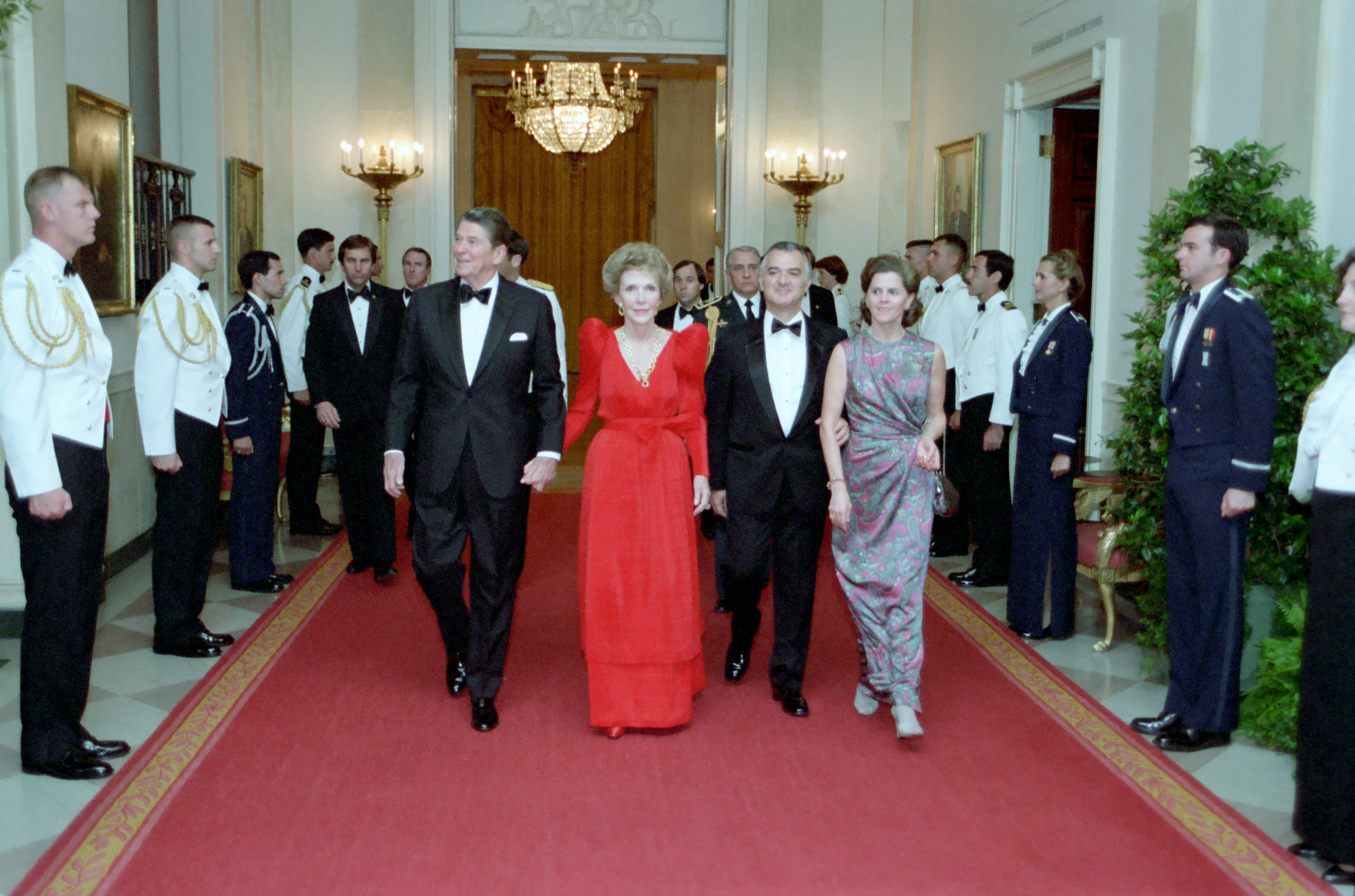
Reagan and de la Madrid Hurtado, with their wives, in Washington in 1983

The conversation did not reopen until 1983 when Mexican President Miguel de la Madrid Hurtado signed an agreement with U.S. President Ronald Reagan to protect, improve and conserve the environment along the border. The 1990s and 2000s saw a significant increase in protected areas within this region with the establishment of the Maderas del Carmen protected area and the Santa Elena Canyon in Mexico in 1994. In 2000, Cemex established an additional borderland conservation project, and in 2009, Mexico made its side of the Rio Grande and the Ocampo Flora and Fauna Protection Area south of Big Bend National Park into protected areas as well. In May 2010, Mexican President Felipe Calderon and U.S. President Barack Obama signed a joint statement pledging both countries' support for cross-border wilderness protection. The following year in October 2011, U.S. Interior Secretary Ken Salazar and Mexican Environment and Natural Resources Secretary Juan Rafael Elvira Quesada outlined the Cooperative Action for Conservation in the Big Bend/Rio Bravo Region, a plan already underway that identified "the next steps for the continued coordination between the two countries in the protection and preservation of the transnational Big Bend/Rio Bravo region – North America's largest and most diverse desert ecosystem."

== Name ==
Over the decades, a number of different names have been proposed for the park, including "Big Bend International Peace Park", "Big Bend International Park", "US-Mexico International Park", "Big Bend-Rio Bravo Binational Natural Area", and "Big Bend-Rio Bravo Natural Area of Binational Interest".

== Relationship Between Mexico and United States ==
=== Historical Relationship ===
The United States and Mexico share a 2,000 mile-border with four U.S. states and have 55 active government regulated points of entry. Following the Mexican War of Independence in 1810, the U.S. and Mexico had numerous territorial disputes which stemmed from their previously established disputes with Spain. In 1821, Mexico achieved independence under the Treaty of Cordoba, but due to the political upheaval in Mexico and greater economic opportunities in Texas, it spurred a great migration across the border. Migration was the first dispute between the U.S. and Mexico. In an attempt to stop this migration, Mexico prohibited immigration to Texas (which was still a Mexican territory) from the United States, but when Texas was annexed and became a U.S. slave state in 1845, Mexico broke diplomatic ties with the U.S.

By 1845, Mexico endured many upsets from the United States. In 1848, following the Mexican-American War, Mexico gave up a good part of territory under the Treaty of Guadalupe-Hidalgo. It wasn't until 1992 when the United States, Mexico and Canada signed the North American Free Trade Agreement (NAFTA) that paved the way for a closer U.S.-Mexico relationship on security, trade, and combat narcotics. NAFTA was then replaced by the United States–Mexico–Canada Agreement (USMCA) in 2020.

=== Border and Immigration ===
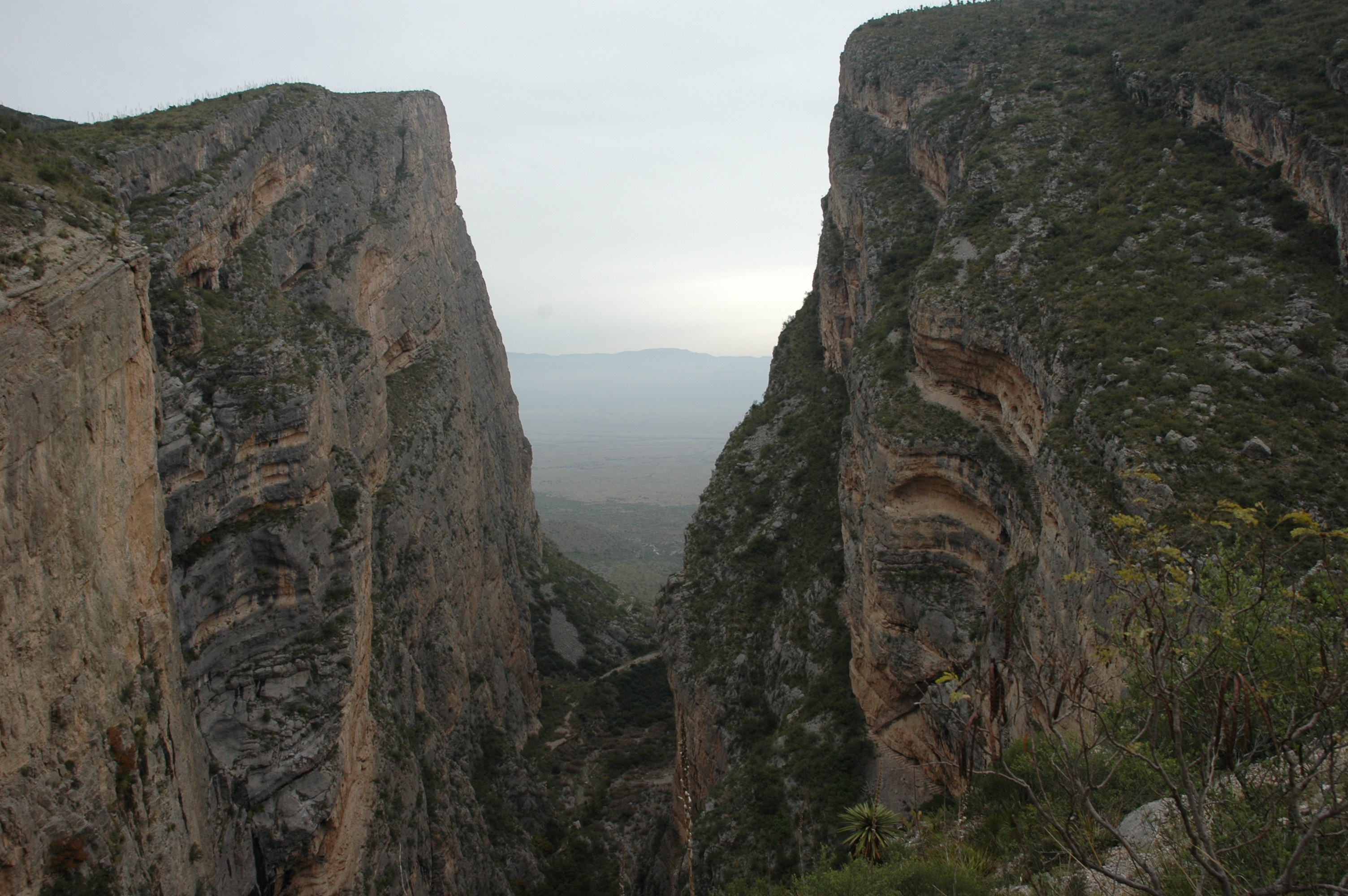
Maderas del Carmen

The relationship between Mexico and the United States regarding border security and immigration is complex. Immigration into the United States is the most common (and often controversial) topic between the two nations. First announced in 2019, the United States and Mexico released a joint declaration to address the shared challenges of irregular migration. In the U.S.-Mexico Joint Declaration, they have pledged to commit to increase migration enforcement, further support of the U.S. expansion of the Migrant Protection Protocols (MPP) on the southern border, and offer jobs, healthcare, and education to migrants in accordance with the MPP.

One small town on the border that would benefit from the completion of El Carmen Big Bend Complex is Boquillas del Carmen, Mexico, which is about a mile south of Big Bend National Park. Like many small towns on the border, Boquillas del Carmen's economy relies on tourism in the parks and protected areas. In Boquillas del Carmen in particular, the primary source of income is tourism from Big Bend National Park. As the only place to cross the border in this region, a small town like Boquillas is critical to ecotourism, and was particularly impacted by the changes in border security in 2001.

Overall, the U.S.-Mexico border serves as a place of trade, educational exchange, drug control, migration regulation and security; however, the increased industrialization and rapid population growth on the border has not only put further pressure on the already fragile political and social climate, but also its natural environment. The dry, arid desert border region houses a population of 15 million people thanks to the rapid economic growth following NAFTA.

=== Environmental Conservation ===
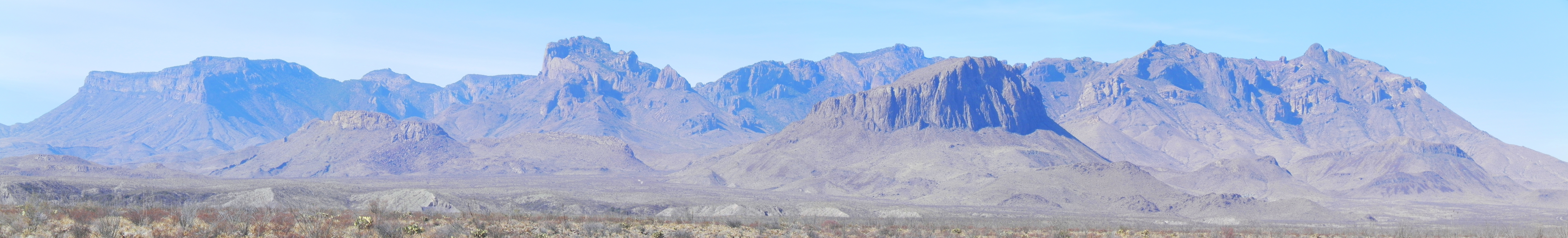
Chisos Mountains in Texas

The El Carmen Big Bend Complex, specifically, is often referred to as “Texas’s Gift to the Nation” and it is famous for its abundance in natural resources, recreational opportunities and cultural history along the U.S.-Mexico border. In order to maintain this, certain conservation efforts have been enacted. After the 1992 NAFTA agreement, the United States, Mexico and Canada signed the North American Commission for Environmental Cooperation (NACEC) in 1994, to address continental environmental issues. These cross-border partnerships are critical to conserving the transboundary ecosystems on the U.S.-Mexico border. Unfortunately, jurisdictional lines, rapid population growth, and governmental funds have greatly divided ecosystems and habitats. Conservation organizations have been making great strides in ameliorating these ecosystems, as evidenced in the bi-national work taking place in protected natural areas along the border. For example, in the Big Bend area of the Chihuahuan Desert, natural resource managers, scientists, and researchers have been carrying out cross-border projects in desert restoration, ecotourism, wildlife management, geo-spatial data development, and river protection.

Disagreements over border security have introduced questions of the relationship between the two countries, as creation of any kind of barrier between the borders would be detrimental to the wildlife population. Certain types of wildlife would be incapable of crossing back over, becoming stranded on one side or the other. In regards to natural barriers, completion of the complex would benefit the Rio Grande river, which has had decreasing water levels due to agricultural usage and climate change.

== Management ==
National Park Service

Though commonly called an ‘international peace park’ or ‘bi-national park,’ the areas on both sides of the border have different designations with different levels of protection. On the American side, Big Bend is a National Park, which earns it the highest level of federal protection. On the Mexican side, Maderas del Carmen and Cañon de Santa Elena are Protected Areas, which are given less protections than national parks in the country. Despite these technical differences in designation, the NPS, U.S.-Mexico Affairs Office, and CONANP collaborate to share knowledge from their management experiences so as to best protect the ecosystem at large.

Big Bend, Maderas del Carmen, and Cañon de Santa Elena are all part of the Chihuahuan Desert, which is not bounded by the 118 miles of international border that politically splits it in half. The ecosystem is continuous, with the same species of animals and plants living throughout the desert on both sides. Running through both sides are wildlife migration corridors and the Chisos mountain range. Each country recognizes the importance of working together to manage this shared ecosystem. Therefore, although each country manages its own areas separately, they share a vision of protection.

Big Bend National Park is managed by the U.S. National Park Service. Each NPS park has a superintendent who oversees all operations. Each NPS park also has a General Management Plan (GMP) to guide decision-making, that is usually updated every 10–15 years. Big Bend's most recent GMP was drafted in 2004 with intent to revisit it in 15–20 years. This GMP identified several needs for park managers to work on solving: better protection of natural resources, improved employee housing and storage facilities, and an expanded visitor interpretation program. It also described an intention to facilitate continued cooperation between countries.

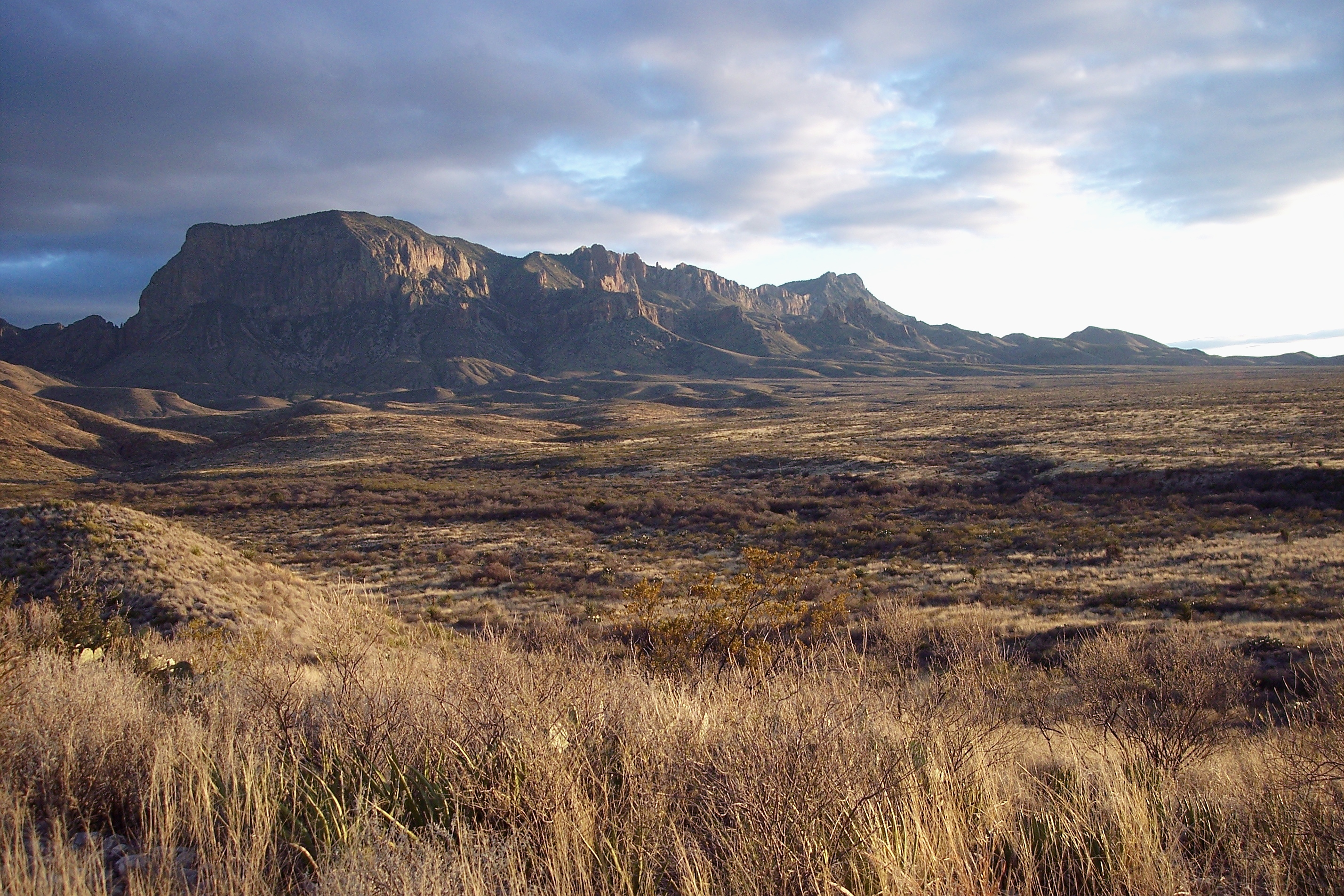
Big Bend Chihuahuan Desert

Maderas del Carmen and Cañon de Santa Elena Áreas de Protección de Flora y Fauna (Areas of Protection of Flora and Fauna) are managed by the Mexican Comisión Nacional de Áreas Naturales Protegidas (CONANP; National Commission of Protected Natural Areas). Maderas del Carmen is in the state of Coahuila, and Cañon de Santa Elena is in Chihuahua. Each state has appointed a management team of directors and staff, and drafted its own management plans. Maderas del Carmen is headed by MVZ Julio Alberto Carrera Treviño. The overarching purpose of protecting Maderas del Carmen is to preserve forests and migration corridors, save endangered animals from extinction, and develop better conservation practices through study. The management plan identifies more specific goals, including creating sustainable development practices, restoring endangered ecosystems, and preserving the cultural significance of the area. C. Miguel Ramón Mendoza Pérez directs the management of Cañon de Santa Elena. The area's management plan outlines several goals: to protect natural resources, to restore ecosystems, and to inspire sustainable practices by sharing knowledge.

== Culture ==
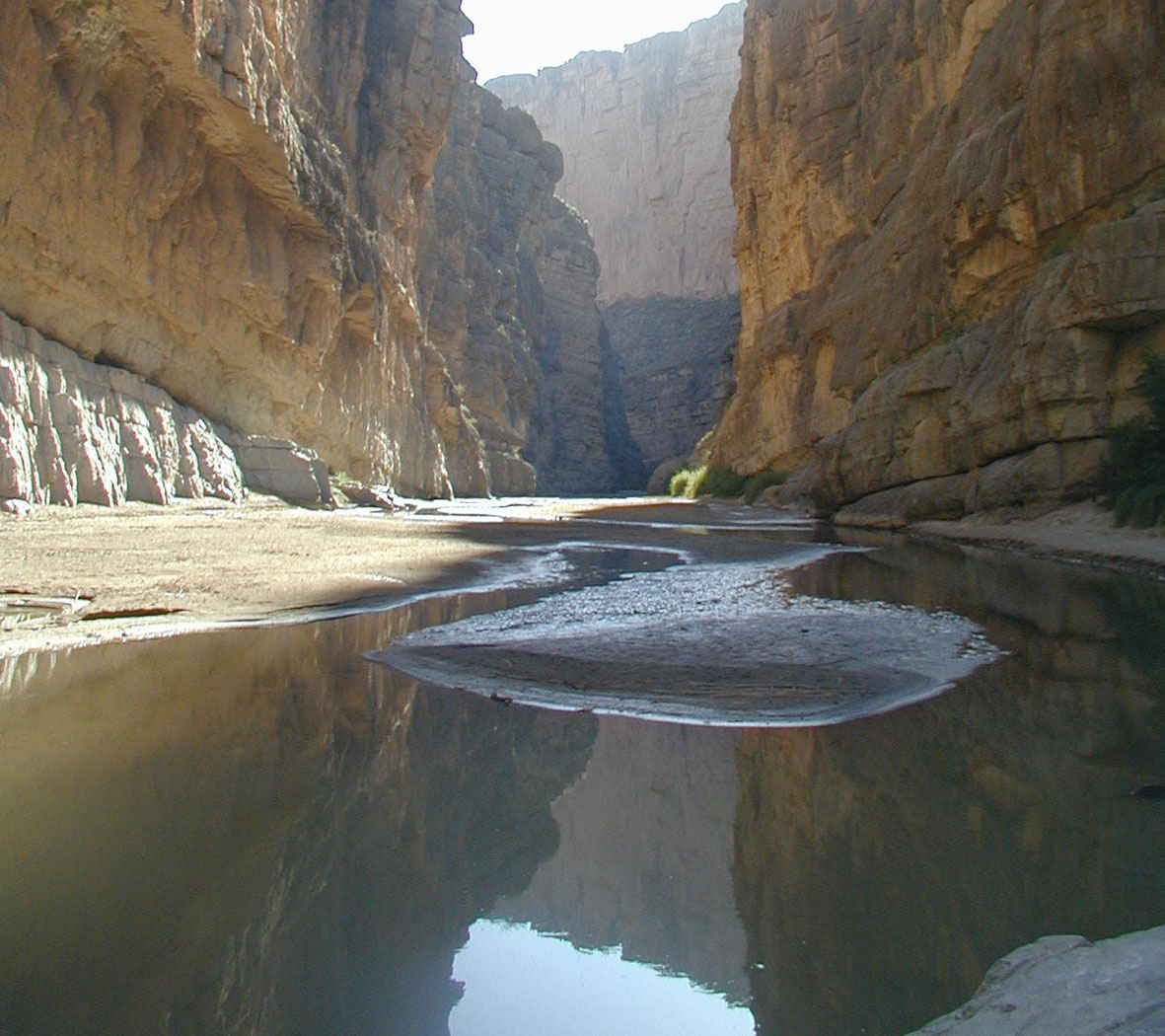
Santa Elena Canyon

The El Carmen Big Bend Complex has great environmental importance to residents of both the United States and Mexico. One of the area's important features is the cultural significance of the land and the relationships different communities within the U.S. and Mexico have with the greater El Carmen Big Bend Complex area. According to the National Park Service, there is “evidence of nearly 12,000 years of human occupation by Paleo-Indian, archaic peoples and a variety of southwestern tribes, including the Chisos, Jumano, Mescalero Apache, and Comanche.” In addition, the Native American tribes in the U.S. and tribes in Mexico within the Big Bend Complex have a relationship with the environment surrounding them, especially to find both food and objects for traditional ceremonies and rituals.

Archaeological objects have been found in Coahuila, Mexico, and southwestern Texas, U.S. within the El Carmen Big Bend Complex. The identification of archaeological objects found on the land indicates the variety of connections Native American tribes had with the greater environment of the Big Bend. Solveig Turpin, an archaeologist, discovered one of the archaeological objects identified in Coahuila, Mexico, on the border of the United States. In these artifacts, she discovered the use of four elements—bone, deer, paint, and music—which are sacred objects of Native American culture, with special significance in traditional ceremonies. The objects found have not yet been associated with a particular tribe or dated to a particular time period in either the United States or Mexico. As a testament to the natural flow between the two countries, the object found by Turpin was a painted deer scapulae which is found in both countries. Turpin asserts that “painted bones are ritual objects, communication devices, or ornamental regalia rather than idle doodling." The painted deer scapulae was later connected to being of ritual importance and or a sacred object for the use of a musical instrument, such as a rasp or a rattle.

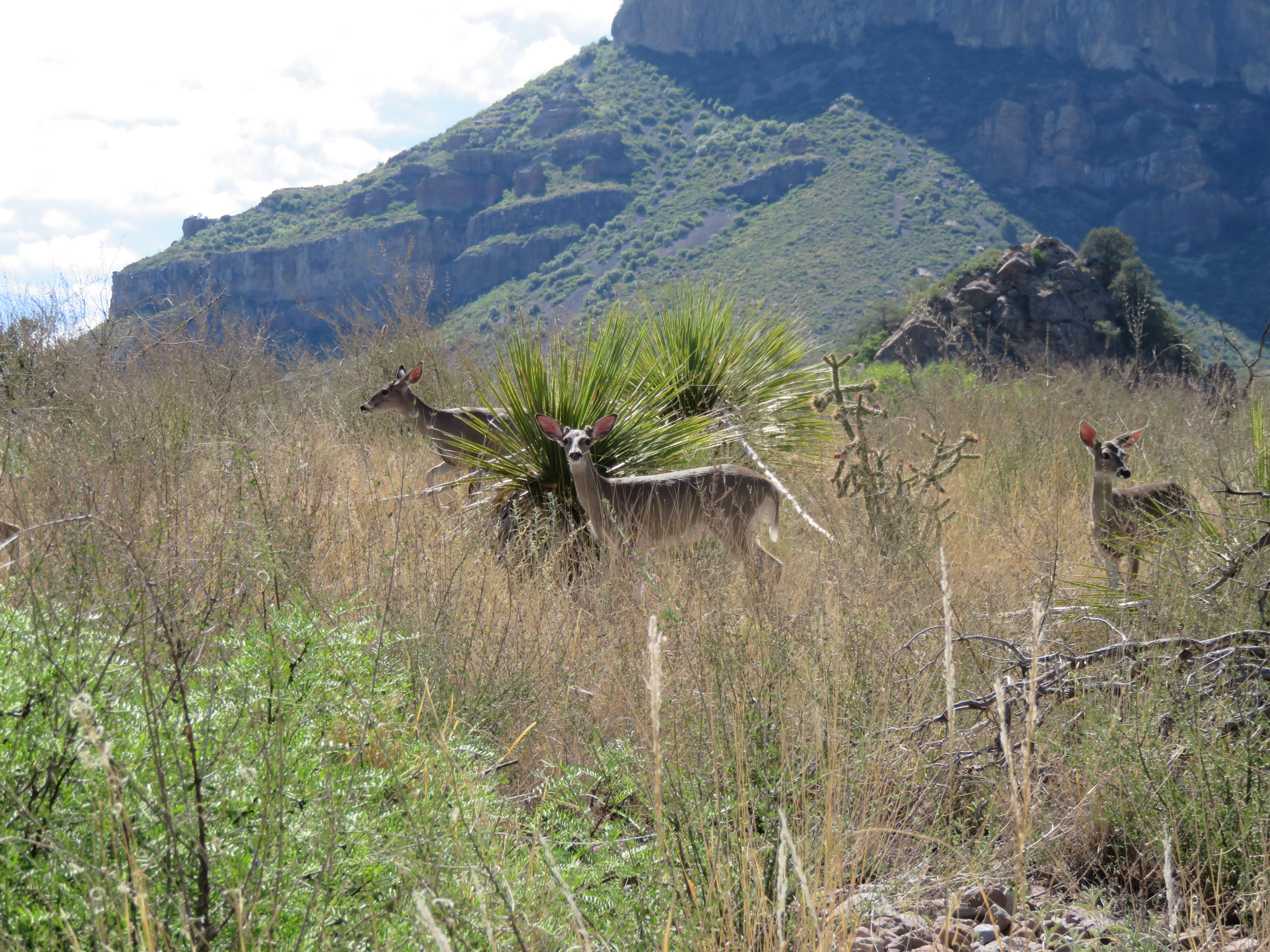
White-tailed deer in Big Bend National Park

In Native American culture, animals have cultural significance, especially through the spiritual beliefs indigenous tribes have with animals. Animals also have a purpose in traditional events, such as rituals. In this case, the deer bone was connected to the element of music, specifically being part of a rattle. Turpin indicated how the scapulae could be interpreted as part of the culture of the Paleo-Indians who lived on the land of the Big Bend Complex. She stated, “Bones, and scapulae in particular, are a link to the supernatural, serving as a device to communicate with the spirit world." Rattles are for traditional uses, which serve to keep a beat during the song.

Native Americans use the skin and specific bones like antlers of an animal for the regalia one wears for traditional dances and ceremonies. Turpin states, “The sacred nature of deer is invoked by dancers who mimic the animal's gait and carry antlers, some of which are painted.” The use of animal bones, including this case of the deer scapulae in the El Carmen Big Bend Complex, can indicate the cultural practices that took place within the environment. The examination of the archaeological object found within the Big Bend Complex, specifically in Coahuila, Mexico, and Southwestern Texas, U.S., provided context on the relationship Native American tribes had with the environment surrounding them, and how significant the land is to their cultural identity.

== See also ==
- Environmental issues along the Mexico–United States border
- Waterton-Glacier International Peace Park
- Friendship Park (San Diego–Tijuana)
