= Secure Fence Act of 2006 =

United States Congress act

- Long title: An Act To establish operational control over the international land and maritime borders of the United States.
- Enacted by: the 109th United States Congress

Citations
- Public law: Pub. L. 109–367 (text) (PDF)
- Statutes at Large: 120 Stat. 2638–2640

Codification
- Acts amended: Illegal Immigration Reform and Immigrant Responsibility Act of 1996
- Titles amended: 8 U.S.C.: Aliens and Nationality
- U.S.C. sections amended: 8 U.S.C. § 1103

Legislative history
- Introduced in the House as H.R. 6061 by Peter King (R-NY) on September 13, 2006; Committee consideration by House Homeland Security Committee; Passed the House on September 14, 2006 (283–138, 1 Present); Passed the Senate on September 29, 2006 (80–19); Signed into law by President George W. Bush on October 26, 2006

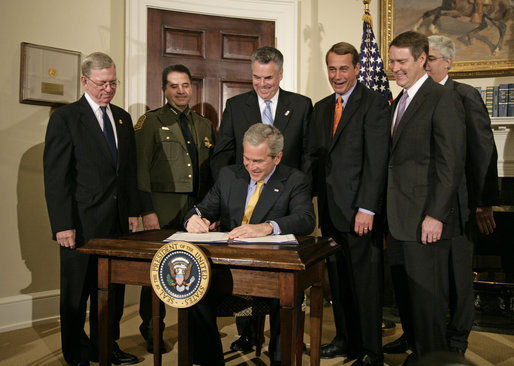
President George W. Bush signing the Secure Fence Act of 2006.

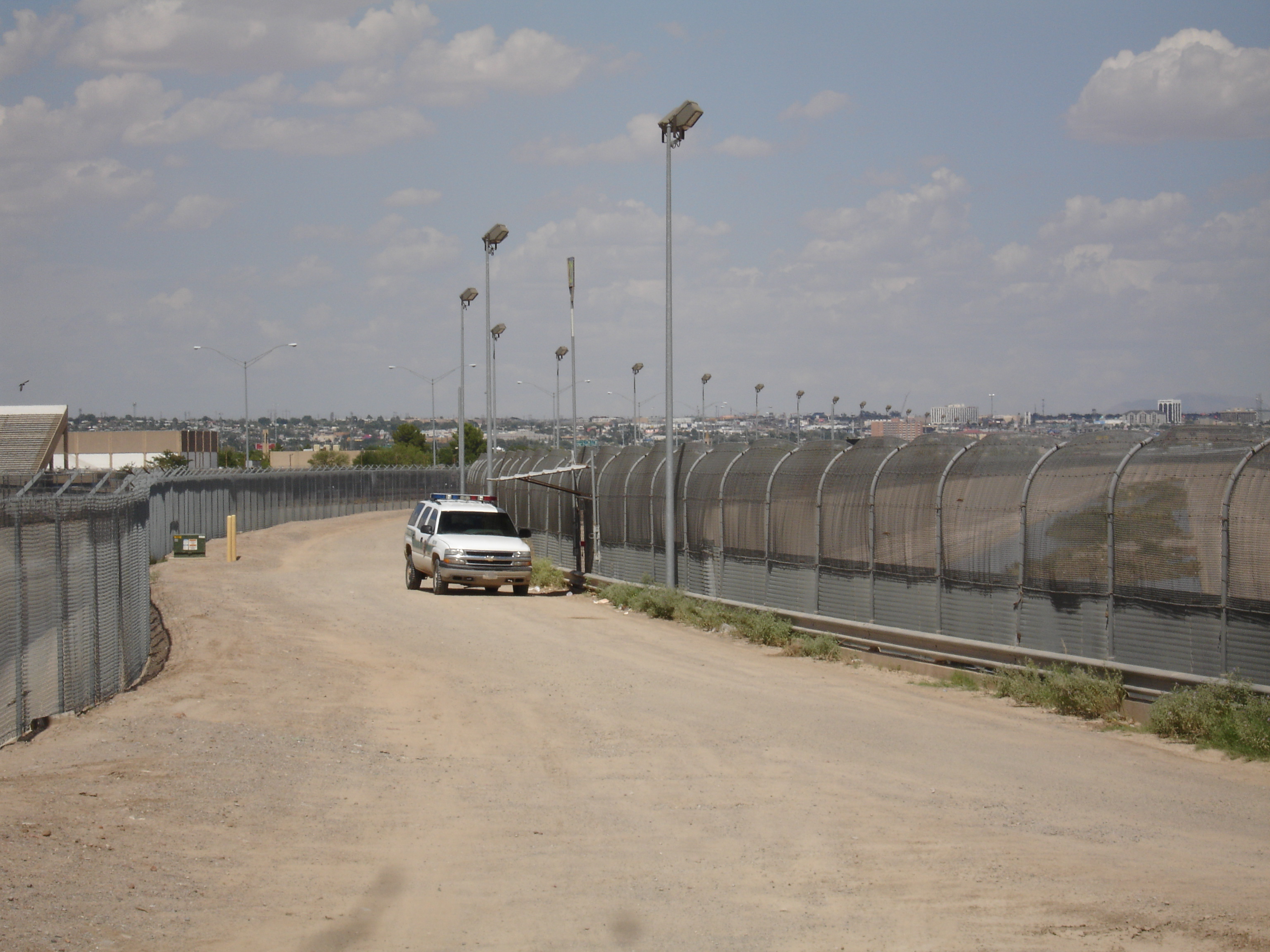
The US-Mexico border fence near El Paso, Texas. The Secure Fence Act of 2006 authorizes the construction of 700 additional miles (1,100 km) of double chain link and barbed wire fences with light and infrared camera poles.

The Secure Fence Act of 2006 (Pub. L. 109–367 (text) (PDF)), also labelled H.R. 6061, is an act of the United States Congress which authorized and partially funded the construction of 700 miles (1,125 km) of fencing along the Mexican border. The act was signed into law on October 26, 2006, by U.S. president George W. Bush, who stated at the time that the act would "help protect the American people", would "make our borders more secure", and was "an important step toward immigration reform".

== Background ==
The fencing built under the 2006 act was not the first border fencing in the United States. The U.S. Border Patrol first began to erect physical barriers in its San Diego sector in 1990. Fourteen miles of fencing were erected along the border of San Diego, California, and Tijuana, Baja California. In the early 2000s, there were increasing concerns over illegal immigration, drug trafficking, human trafficking, and security threats posed by the border. These concerns lead to the introduction of the Secure Fence Act of 2006.

== Legislative History ==
The Secure Fence Act (Bill H.R. 6061) was introduced in the House of Representatives on September 13, 2006, by Congressman Peter T. King, Republican of New York. The act passed the House by a vote of 283–138 on September 14, 2006. It passed the Senate 80–19 on September 29, 2006. The act received bipartisan support. The Senate focused more on the effectiveness of a border fence, while the House debate included more objections to the closed-rule procedure that restricted changes. Both parties wanted to speed up the process, but had different motives to do so.

== Provisions ==
In 2006, at the time the Secure Fence Act was passed, George W. Bush's White House touted the fence as "an important step toward immigration reform." The White House Office of the Press Secretary stated that the act "Authorizes the construction of hundreds of miles of additional fencing along our Southern border; Authorizes more vehicle barriers, checkpoints, and lighting to help prevent people from entering our country illegally; Authorizes the Department of Homeland Security to increase the use of advanced technology like cameras, satellites, and unmanned aerial vehicles to reinforce our infrastructure at the border." After the September 11th attack, Peter King felt as though he needed to make a change. Since he had experience in law enforcement, he knew the rules and regulations on how to approach the issue.

== 2007 amendment ==
The Secure Fence Act provided for "at least two layers of reinforced fencing" to be built. However, the U.S. Department of Homeland Security (DHS) successfully argued to Congress "that different border terrains required different types of fencing, that a one-size-fits-all approach across the entire border didn't make sense."

An amendment introduced by Senator Kay Bailey Hutchison, Republican of Texas, was passed as part of the Consolidated Appropriations Act, 2008, amending the law to read: "nothing in this paragraph shall require the Secretary of Homeland Security to install fencing, physical barriers, roads, lighting, cameras, and sensors in a particular location along an international border of the United States, if the Secretary determines that the use or placement of such resources is not the most appropriate means to achieve and maintain operational control over the international border at such location."

== Erection of the fence ==
By April 2009, DHS had erected about 613 miles (985 km) of new pedestrian fencing and vehicle barriers along the southwest border from California to Texas. Delays frustrated some, such as Senator Jim DeMint, Republican of South Carolina, who in 2010 introduced legislation seeking to require completion of the 700-mile-long, double-layered fence. (DHS had since 2007 begun "to shift its focus to erecting a 'virtual fence' along the 2,000-mile border, using sensors, cameras and other high-tech equipment to prevent illegal crossings".) DeMint's legislation was defeated in a 52–45 Senate vote in 2010.

By May 2011, DHS reported completing 649 miles of fencing (99.5% of the 652 miles planned). The barrier was made up of 299 miles of vehicle barriers and 350 miles of pedestrian fence. The fencing includes a steel fence (varying in height between 18 and 26 feet) that divides the border towns of Nogales, Arizona in the U.S. and Nogales, Sonora in Mexico. A 2016 report by the Government Accountability Office confirmed that the government had completed the fence by 2015. A 2017 GAO report noted: "In addition to the 654 miles of primary fencing, CBP has also deployed additional layers of pedestrian fencing behind the primary border fencing, including 37 miles of secondary fencing and 14 miles of tertiary fencing."

== Cost ==
Although the 2006 law authorized construction of a fence, Congress initially did not fully appropriate funds for it (see authorization-appropriation process). "Congress put aside $1.4 billion for the fence, but the whole cost, including maintenance, was pegged at $50 billion over 25 years, according to analyses at the time."

A 2017 GAO report noted: "According to CBP, from fiscal year 2007 through 2015, it spent approximately $2.3 billion to deploy border fencing along the southwest border, and CBP will need to spend a substantial amount to sustain these investments over their lifetimes. CBP did not provide a current life-cycle costs estimate to maintain pedestrian and vehicle fencing, however, in 2009 CBP estimated that maintaining fencing would cost more than $1 billion over 20 years."

== Impact and effects ==
=== Migration and illegal border-crossings ===
A report in May 2008 by the Congressional Research Service found "strong indication" that illegal border-crossers had simply found new routes. New York Times op-ed writer Lawrence Downes wrote in 2013: "A climber with a rope can hop it in less than half a minute. ... Smugglers with jackhammers tunnel under it. They throw drugs and rocks over it. The fence is breached not just by sunlight and shadows, but also the hooded gaze of drug-cartel lookouts, and by bullets. Border agents describe their job as an unending battle of wits, a cat-mouse game with the constant threat of violence."

As of 2016, fence was routinely climbed or otherwise circumvented. A 2017 Government Accountability Office (GAO) report, citing U.S. Customs and Border Protection (CBP) data, found that from fiscal year 2010 through fiscal year 2015, the U.S.-Mexico border fence had been breached 9,287 times, at an average cost of $784 per breach to repair. The same GAO report concluded that "CBP cannot measure the contribution of fencing to border security operations along the southwest border because it has not developed metrics for this assessment." GAO noted that because the government lacked such data, it was unable to assess the effectiveness of border fencing, and therefore could not "identify the cost effectiveness of border fencing compared to other assets the agency deploys, including Border Patrol agents and various surveillance technologies."

The GAO reported in 2017 that both pedestrian and vehicle barriers have been defeated by various methods, including using ramps to drive vehicles "up and over" vehicle fencing in the sector; scaling, jumping over, or breaching pedestrian fencing; burrowing or tunneling underground; and even using small aircraft.

A 2019 National Bureau of Economic Research paper by Dartmouth College and Stanford University economists found that the "total impact of the border wall expansion including all general equilibrium adjustments was to reduce the (long-run) number of Mexican workers residing in the United States by about 50,000, a decline of approximately 0.4%."

=== Economy ===
A 2019 estimate by Dartmouth and Stanford economists found that Mexican workers and high-skilled U.S. workers suffered minor economic harm as a result of the fence expansion (average annual income loss of 81 cents, $1.82, and $2.73 for low-skilled Mexican workers, high-skill Mexican workers, and high-skill U.S. workers, respectively), and that on average low-skill U.S. workers benefited economically by a negligible amount (average annual income gain of 28 cents per year). These estimates excluded the direct costs of wall construction (about $7 per U.S. person).

=== Environment ===
Fencing built under the 2006 Secure Fence Act caused habitat fragmentation that adversely affected wildlife, including endangered wildlife. A 2011 study published in the peer-reviewed journal Diversity and Distributions determined that the habitat fragmentation determined that "small range size is associated with a higher risk of extinction, and for some species, the barriers reduce range by as much as 75%." The study identified the most "at risk" species as the Arroyo toad (Anaxyrus californicus), California red-legged frog (Rana draytonii), black-spotted newt (Notophthalmus meridionalis), Pacific pond turtle (Clemmys marmorata), and jaguarundi (Puma yagouaroundi). The study also identified coastal California, coastal Texas, and the Madrean Sky Island Archipelago of southeastern Arizona as the three border regions where the barrier posed the greatest risk to wildlife. In Texas, for example, "the border barrier affects 60% to 70% of the habitat in the South Texas Wildlife Refuge Complex, which includes the Laguna Atascosa, Lower Rio Grande Valley, and Santa Ana National Wildlife Refuges."

=== Violence ===
A paper by University of Pennsylvania political scientist Benjamin Laughlin estimates that the Secure Fence Act caused at least 1,000 additional deaths in Mexican regions adjacent to the U.S.–Mexican border. The fence's construction changed "the value of territory for smuggling," thereby upending agreements among Mexican drug cartels, resulting in increased violence and an intensification of the Mexican drug war.

== Proposals for further expansion ==
The Republican Party's 2012 platform called upon the "double-layered fencing" to be built as originally called for in 2006 law (prior to the 2007 amendment). The Washington Office on Latin America writes that the extremely high cost of complying with the Secure Fence Act's mandate—estimated at US$4.1 billion, or more than the Border Patrol's entire annual budget of US$3.55 billion—was the main reason that the fence was not fully built.

In 2016, Republican presidential candidate Donald Trump proposed building a border wall "as high as 55 feet" along the U.S.–Mexican border, making the pledge the centerpiece of his campaign. Trump's proposed wall—which he said would consist of 2,000 miles "of hardened concrete, and ... rebar, and steel" across the entire southern border would be much more extensive than the fencing built under the 2006 act. On January 25, 2017, days after taking office, Trump issued Executive Order 13767, directing construction of a U.S. border wall. Experts doubt that the border wall proposed by Trump would actually significantly reduce illegal immigration, or have any benefits commensurate with the anticipated high cost of construction, estimated to be billions of dollars. Trump's demand for Congress to appropriate $5.7 billion for the wall resulted in the 2018–19 United States federal government shutdown, which lasted for 35 days.

== See also ==
- Roosevelt Reservation
- Mexico–United States border wall

== Works cited ==
- Southwest Border Security: Additional Actions Needed to Better Assess Fencing's Contributions to Operations and Provide Guidance for Identifying Capability Gaps, U.S. Government Accountability Office (February 2017).
- https://li.proquest.com/legislativeinsight/docview?id=CR-2006-0914-PL109-367-H.2&xXp=19176ECAB23&uid=1043
- https://li.proquest.com/legislativeinsight/docview?id=CR-2006-0925-PL109-367-S&xXp=19176ECAB23&uid=1047
- https://georgewbush-whitehouse.archives.gov/news/releases/2006/10/20061026-1.html
- https://www.presidency.ucsb.edu/sites/default/files/books/presidential-documents-archive-guidebook/national-political-party-platforms-of-parties-receiving-electoral-votes-1840-2016/25850.pdf
