= Executive Order 13767 =

Executive order signed by U.S. President Donald Trump

- Border Security and Immigration Enforcement Improvements

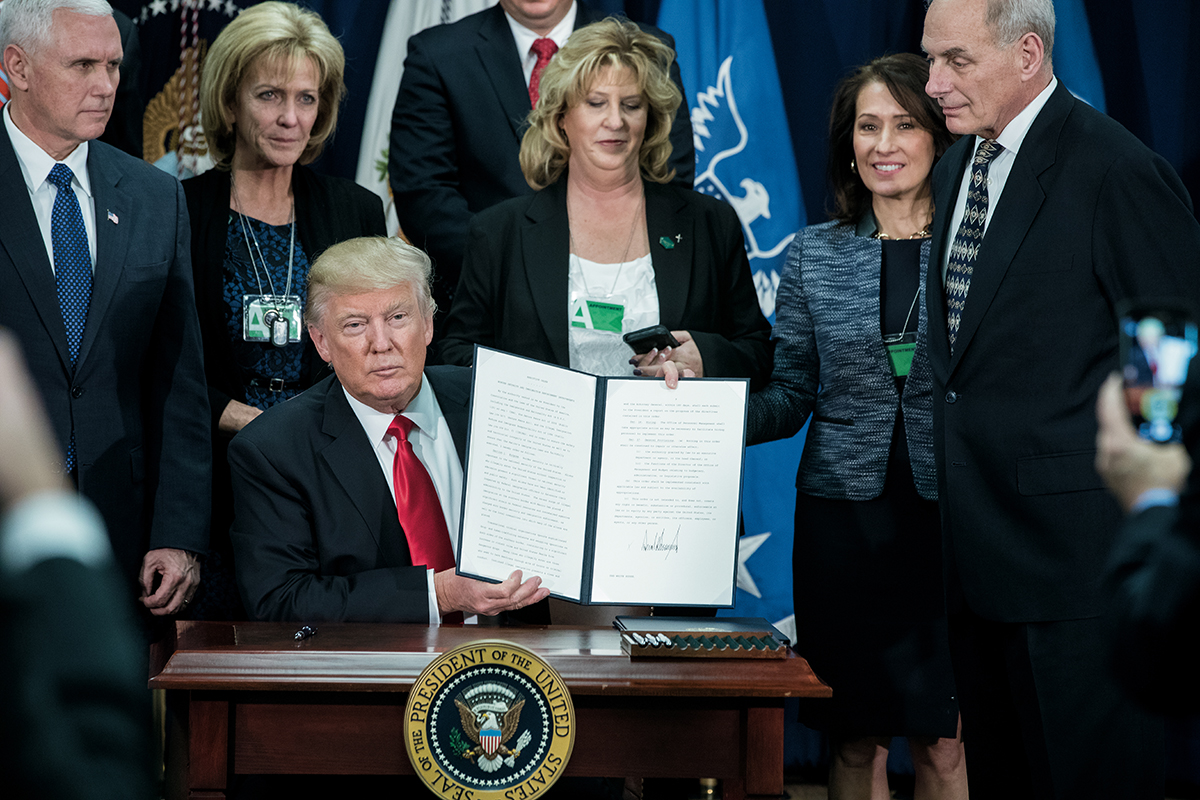
- President Donald Trump displays the executive order, January 25, 2017
- Executive Order 13767, as published in the Federal Register
- Type: Executive order
- Number: 13767
- President: Donald Trump
- Signed: January 25, 2017

Federal Register details
- Federal Register document number: 2017-02095
- Publication date: January 30, 2017
- Document citation: 82 FR 8793

Summary
- Calls for construction of a physical wall across the southern border of the United States; Calls for the hiring of additional Border Patrol agents

Repealed by
- Executive Order 14010, "Creating a Comprehensive Regional Framework to Address the Causes of Migration, to Manage Migration Throughout North and Central America, and to Provide Safe and Orderly Processing of Asylum Seekers at the United States Border", February 2, 2021

Executive Order 13767, titled Border Security and Immigration Enforcement Improvements, was issued by United States president Donald Trump on January 25, 2017. The order directs a wall to be built along the Mexico–United States border. On December 22, 2018, the federal government went into a shutdown due to Trump's demand for $5.6 billion in federal funds to begin work on the wall. By January 12, 2019, the shutdown became the 2nd longest budget shutdown in U.S. history.

The wall was a central presidential campaign promise. Trump repeatedly and falsely pledged that Mexico would "pay for that wall" and on many occasions falsely asserted that it was doing so; in fact, Mexico never contributed anything to wall construction, and the Trump administration steered millions of dollars in U.S. taxpayer money to wall construction, diverting funds from the military construction budget and other sources. The Trump administration sought $18 billion in funding.

In late 2017 the Department of Homeland Security paid about $3 million for the construction of eight prototypes near San Diego, California, with local taxpayers spending about $2.3 million in security. In November 2017 SWF Construction won an $18 million contract to replace an existing 2-mile wall in Calexico, California. Construction began in February 2018.

The executive order was revoked by Trump's successor, President Joe Biden.

== Provisions ==
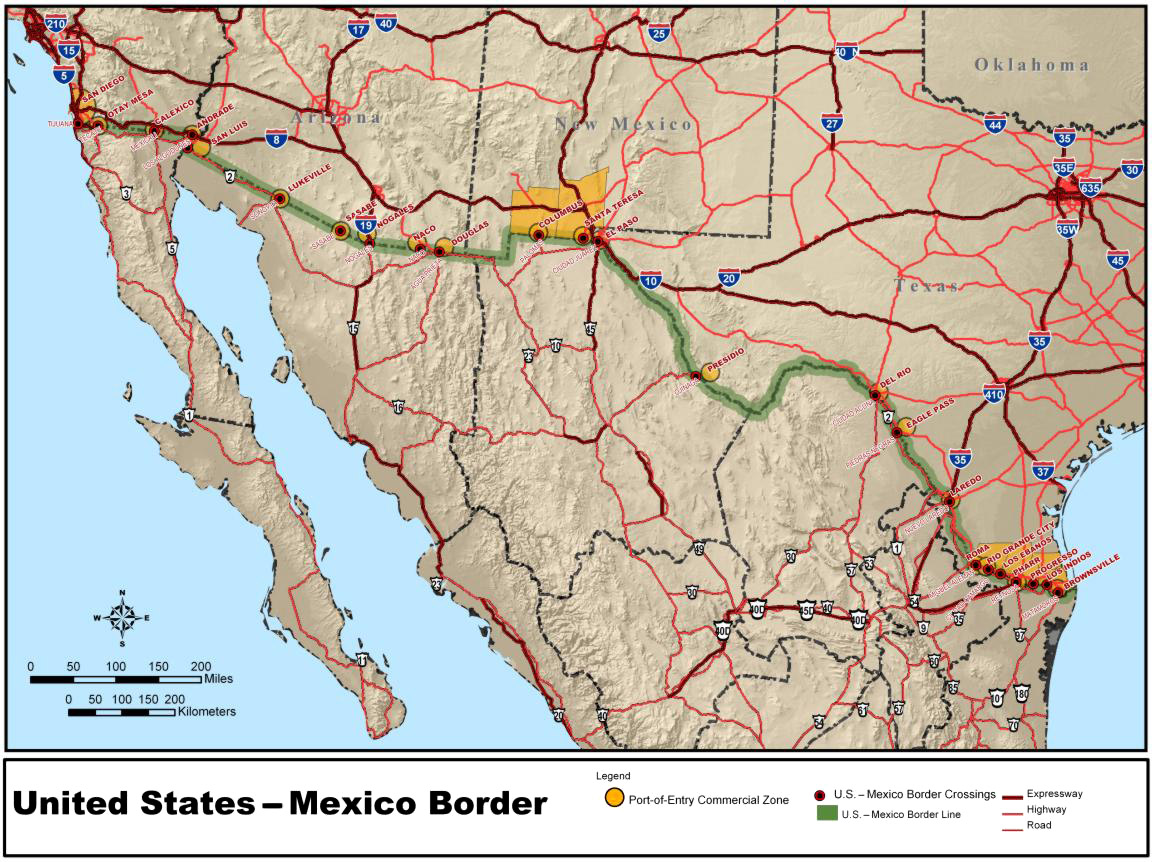
The Mexico–United States border

The order directs "executive departments and agencies ... to deploy all lawful means to secure the Nation's southern border, to prevent further illegal immigration into the United States, and to repatriate illegal aliens swiftly, consistently, and humanely", and states that "It is the policy of the executive branch to secure the southern border of the United States through the immediate construction of a physical wall on the southern border."

=== Funding ===
The executive order, signed on January 25, 2017, calls for the construction of "a physical wall along the southern border" and defines wall as "a contiguous, physical wall or other similarly secure, contiguous, and impassable physical barrier."

The order did not estimate a cost for the wall project. An internal report by the Department of Homeland Security acquired by Reuters in February 2017 estimated that Trump's proposed border wall would take an estimated 3.5 years to build and cost $21.6 billion. The cost was higher than estimates given by Trump during the campaign, in part because it accounted for the time and cost of acquiring the required private land on the border.

=== Federal budget shutdown in 2018–2019 ===
On December 22, 2018, the federal government went into a shutdown due to Trump's demand for $5.6 billion in federal funds for a wall on the US–Mexico border. On January 12, 2019, the shutdown became the longest budget shutdown in U.S. history.

The government shutdown ended after Congress passed, and Trump signed, a bill without the billions in funding for the border wall Trump demanded. The next month, however, Trump thereafter issued a proclamation declaring a "national emergency" on the border, and began to divert money from other projects to border-wall construction. This precipitated a constitutional clash over separation of powers.

=== Revocation ===
President Joe Biden issued Executive Order 14010 in early February 2021, shortly after he took office; the order revoked Trump's Executive Order 13767.

== See also ==
- 2017 Mexico–United States diplomatic crisis
- Border barrier
- Secure Fence Act of 2006
- Roosevelt Reservation
