= Maderas del Carmen =

National Park in Coahuila, Mexico

- IUCN category VI (protected area with sustainable use of natural resources)
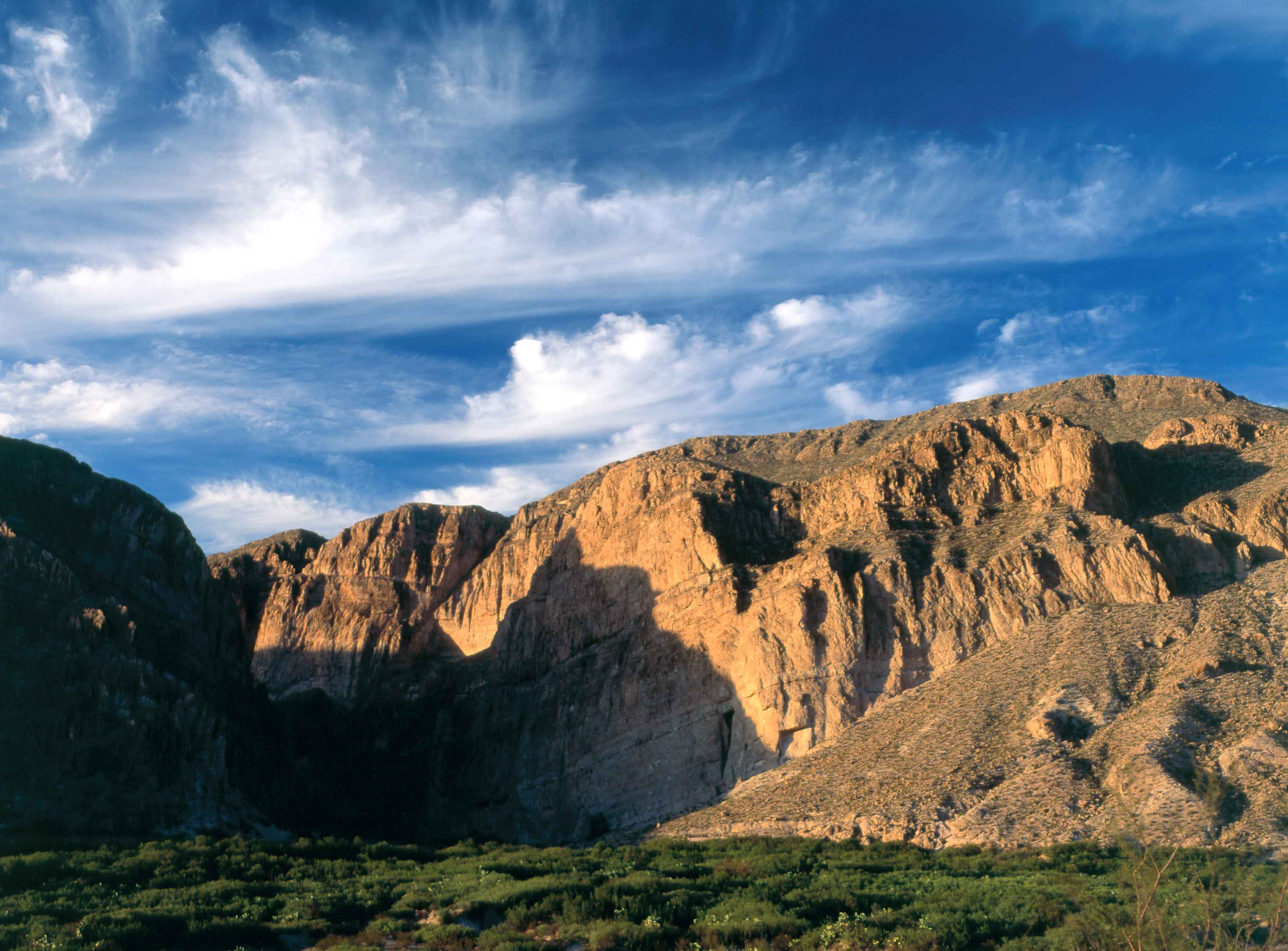

- Location within Mexico Location within Coahuila
- Coordinates: 29°06′30.8″N 102°38′04.9″W
- Area: 208,381 ha (804.56 sq mi)
- Designation: Flora and fauna protection area and biosphere reserve
- Designated: 1994 (flora and fauna protection area) and 2006 (biosphere reserve)
- Administrator: National Commission of Natural Protected Areas

Maderas del Carmen is a biosphere reserve in the northern Mexican state of Coahuila.

Maderas del Carmen encompasses part of the Sierra del Carmen, a northern finger of the Sierra Madre Oriental range. The reserve includes both dry Chihuahuan Desert shrublands and forested sky island, high-elevation enclaves of Sierra Madre Oriental pine-oak forest. The reserve is home to 400 bird species and 70 mammal species, including the American black bear (Ursus americanus), collared peccary (Pecari tajacu), and cougar (Puma concolor).

The region was designated a biosphere reserve in 2006. It is located in the municipalities of Ocampo, Acuña, and Múzquiz.

== Conservation efforts ==
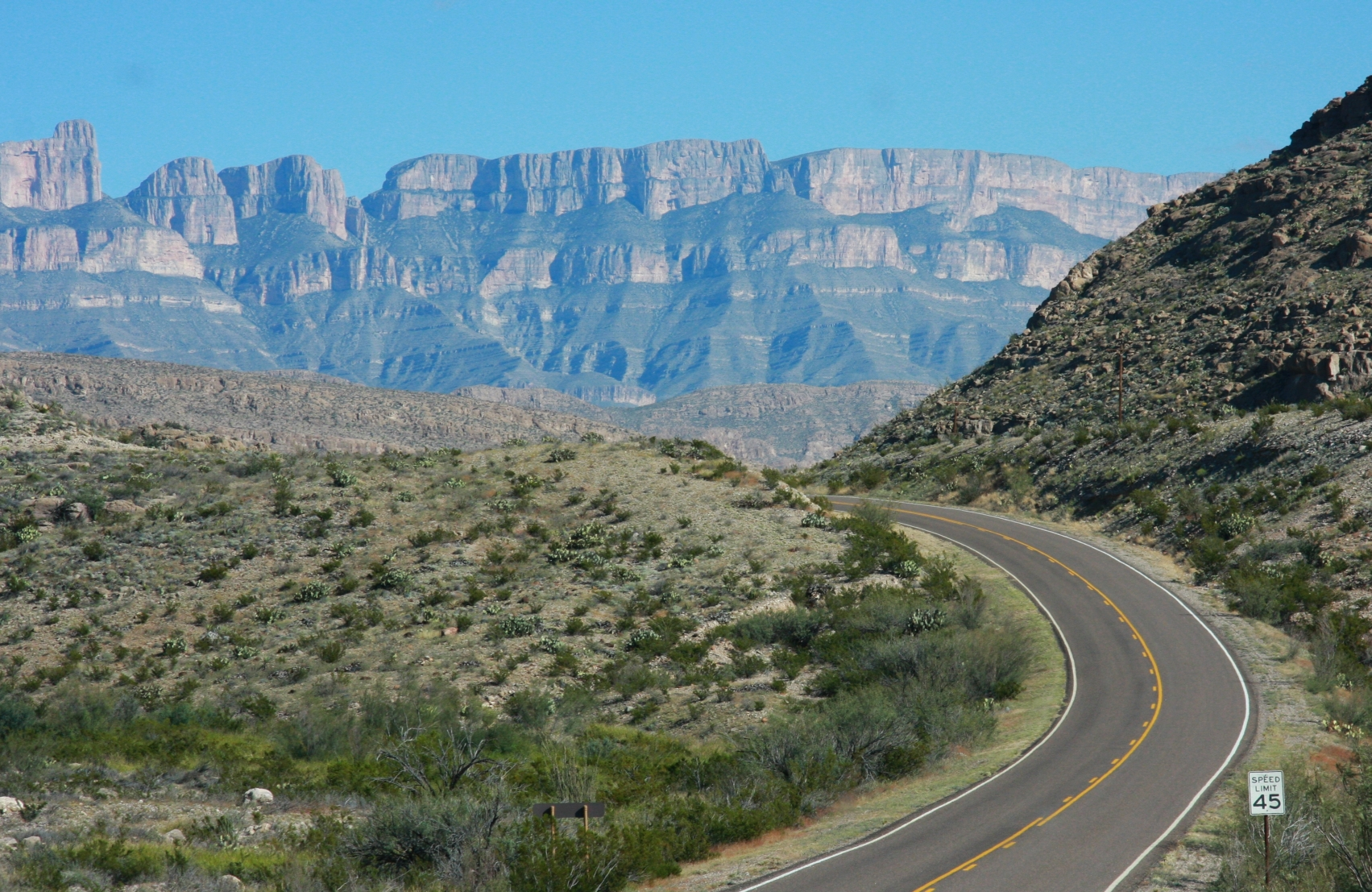
The Sierra del Carmen seen from Big Bend in Texas

The isolation of the Sierra del Carmen and its relatively undisturbed environment has led to conservation efforts in Mexico and jointly with the United States. Much of the Sierra del Carmen has been declared by the government of Mexico the Maderas del Carmen Flora and Fauna Protected Area, a designation which allows many economic activities and private land holdings to continue to exist within the boundaries. The protected area comprises 210,326 hectares (519,730 acres). The Maderas del Carmen is part of a bi-lateral conservation project called the El Carmen—Big Bend Conservation Corridor Initiative which includes contiguous land designated for conservation on both sides of the border totaling more than s 12,000 square kilometres (3,000,000 acres), an area almost as large as the U.S. state of Connecticut. In 2005, Maderas del Carmen became the first designated Wilderness area in Latin America.

Location map of Coahuila with the urban areas. EPSG:3857 projection, Geographic limits of the map: N: 30.25° N S: 24.25° N W: 104.50° W E: 99.50° W

The Maderas del Carmen Protected Area was created in 1994, although conservation efforts were initially slowed because the land was privately owned, either in large ranches or in the collective farms called ejidos. In 2000 a Mexican corporation, Cementos de Mexico (CEMEX) began to purchase lands for conservation in the region. On CEMEX lands livestock and fences were removed and native vegetation encouraged. By 2006, CEMEX owned 78,947 ha (195,080 acres) in or near the Maderas del Carmen and managed another 25,303 ha (62,530 acres). In 2009 the Mexican government established the Ocampo Flora and Fauna Protection Area, which adjoins Maderas del Carmen on the east.

One of the important characteristics of the Sierra del Carmen is that it functions as a "corridor" enabling wildlife to migrate north and south. In the late 1980s the corridor between the Sierra and the mountains of west Texas enabled the black bear to disperse northward and reestablish itself in Big Bend National Park. The black bear had been extirpated from west Texas in the 1950s.

In other initiatives, in 2000, CEMEX in cooperation with conservation organizations in Mexico and Texas began breeding and releasing to the wild bighorn sheep which had been absent from the Sierra del Carmen for more than 50 years.

On October 24, 2011, Mexico and the United States signed an agreement for "Cooperative Action for Conservation in the Big Bend-Rio Bravo Natural Area of Binational Interest".

In 2020, 19 plains bison were transported from Janos Biosphere Reserve, and formed the second herd in Mexico to reestablish wild populations of bison. The El Carmen nature reserve was established on the plains of Coahuila.

== See also ==
- Mexico–United States international park
