= Cañón de Santa Elena Flora and Fauna Protection Area =

Protected area in Mexico

Cañón de Santa Elena
- Área de Protección de Flora y Fauna Cañón de Santa Elena
- IUCN category VI (protected area with sustainable use of natural resources)
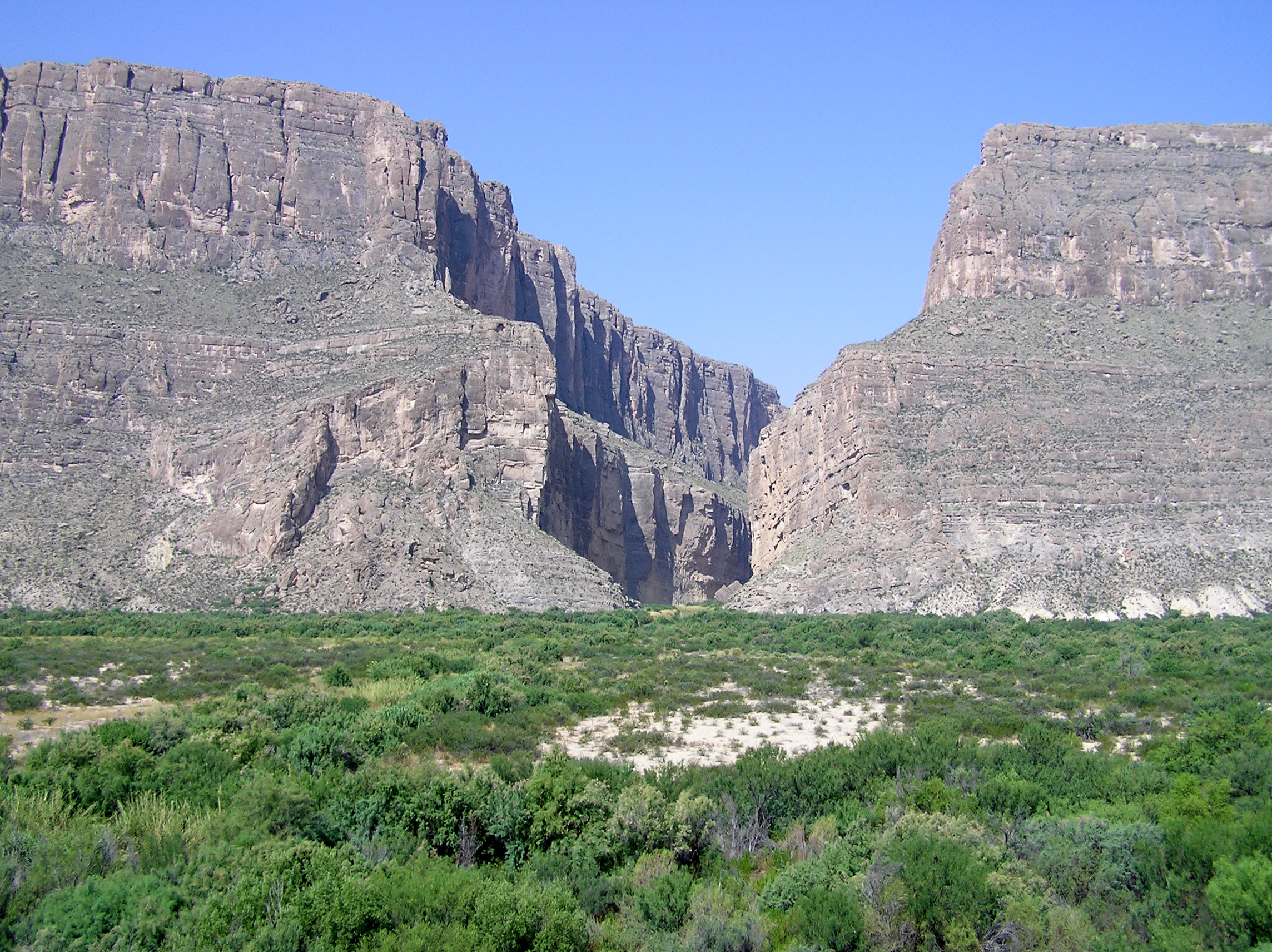
- View of the Santa Elena Canyon from Big Bend National Park, U.S.

- Location within Mexico
- Location: Municipalities of Manuel Benavides and Ojinaga, Chihuahua, Mexico
- Coordinates: 29°07′28″N 103°52′37″W
- Area: 277,209 ha (685,000 acres)
- Designation: Flora and fauna protection area
- Designated: November 7, 1994
- Governing body: Mexico
- Administrator: National Commission of Natural Protected Areas

The Cañón de Santa Elena Flora and Fauna Protection Area (Spanish: Área de Protección de Flora y Fauna Cañón de Santa Elena) is a protected area for plants and wildlife in the Mexican municipalities of Manuel Benavides and Ojinaga, in the state of Chihuahua. It was founded on November 7, 1994 and has an area of 277,209 hectares.

The purpose of the reserve is to protect the Chihuahuan Desert, home to many species of plants and wildlife. Diverse species of the former category are found among scrub stands, microphyll desert, rosetophylous scrub, pasture, oak forest and riparian zones. Birds and mammals that have adapted to aridity, such as wildcat and some deer, as well as birds of prey, highlight the latter category.

== History ==
The arrowheads, mortars and paintings found at the site indicate the following human occupation periods: Paleo-Indian (15,000–6,500 BC), Archaic (6500 BC – 900 AD), early Postclassic (900–1500 AD), and late Postclassic (1300–1680). These populations were dispersed with seasonal movements, allowing the use of resources. They engaged in fishing, the collection, hunting, and agriculture. Among the groups transiting this area were the Conchos, the Jumano, the Chisos and Apaches, the Chiricahua, the Mescaleros and Lipanes.

The Spanish and Comanche arrived at the same time, and ended with the Mescalero and Lipan. The colonial government established the Rio Grande as a line of defense, where it built small fortifications, which were guarded by a garrison of soldiers. These were San Carlos, in Chihuahua, and the Board of Rivers, San Vicente, Santa Rosa and San Juan Bautista, in Coahuila. Until 1890 the region remained virtually uninhabited due to attacks by Apaches and Comanche tribes.

From 1784, the fort of San Carlos was abandoned and was only used by travelers, who were protected from attack by Apaches and bandits. The first council of municipality of Ojinaga was built in 1824, and was annexed in 1831, as a section of San Carlos, which bears the name of Manuel Benavides.

== Geography ==
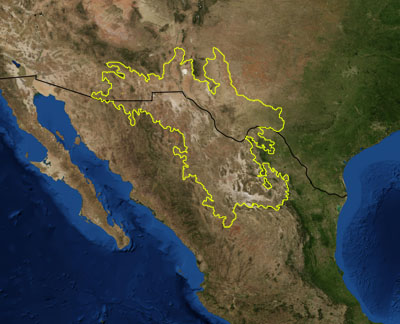
Map of the Chihuahuan Desert, as a satellite image from NASA, with the border between the US and Mexico shown in black. The area is protected by several reserves in both countries.

The protected area is in the Chihuahuan desert ecoregion. It includes a number of mountain ranges separated by valleys and undulating plains. It has great diversity of vegetation types because of the large differences in altitude, from 700 to 2,400 m (2,300 to 7,900 ft) above sea level.

=== Location ===
The Santa Elena Canyon is the state of Chihuahua, bounded on the north by the Rio Grande and on the east by Coahuila. 80% of the reserve is located in the municipalities of Manuel Benavides and Ojinaga. It covers a strip of 30 km (19 mi) wide by 100 km (62 mi) long. It has a height above sea level ranging from 700 to 2,400 m (2,300 to 7,900 ft), on the highest part. It adjoins Ocampo Flora and Fauna Protection Area on the east.

=== Geology ===
The area has a base of Cretaceous limestone on which developed volcanic in mid-Tertiary. Volcanism caused folds between the plates, because the fragment into blocks of lifts formed and depressions. In areas are metamorphic rocks Palaeozoic granitic and igneous intrusions.

The area of Santa Elena Canyon includes the mountain ranges of El Ranchito, Sierra Rica and El Mulatto, among which are the valleys of Alamo, Chapó, El Mulato, and Rancho Blanco. Also they highlight the low hills of Manuel Benavides, Paso Lajitas and San Antonio. The area has two canyons: La Gaviota (the Seagull), 656 m (2,152 ft) deep, and Santa Elena, with a depth of 467 m (1,532 ft). Much of the area is flat, with slopes less than 8% and bigoted hills and formations.

=== Climate ===
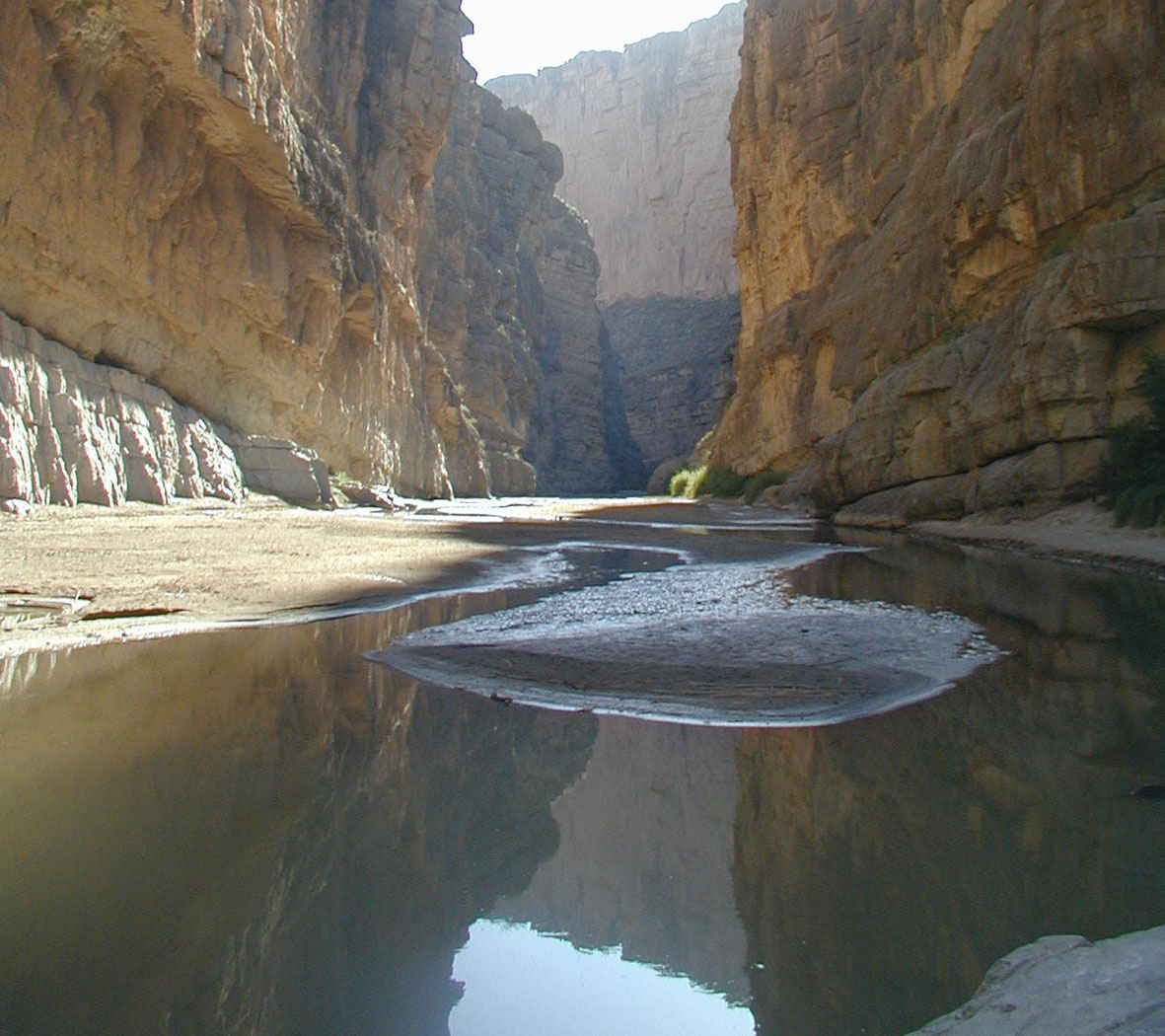
The Rio Grande, which separates the US from Mexico, passing through the Santa Elena Canyon.

The area has an extremely dry and hot climate. The climatic conditions are very extreme, with temperatures up to 50 °C (122 °F) in summer. In addition, there is a contrast between the desert and cold temperate ecosystems. The climate is arid, with little rain in summer.

=== Demographics ===
The main villages of the area are Manuel Benavides, which is the county seat, Loma de Juárez, El Mulato, Area Montoya, Paso Lajitas, New Lajitas, Santa Elena, Altares, Paso de San Antonio, San Antonio Alamos, Providence, Jars of Wizards and Alamos Marquez. In addition, the towns of Ojinaga, La Mula, Mahijoma and Morita are located in the area of influence. It is estimated that 2,578 inhabitants live in the protected area.

Within the protected area there are 125 properties, which occupy 34.8% of the area, 13 ejidos, which occupy 59.4%, and foundations and centers of population and public lands occupy the remaining 5.8%. The soils of the area and the area of influence are used for agriculture, livestock, and mining.

== Flora and fauna ==
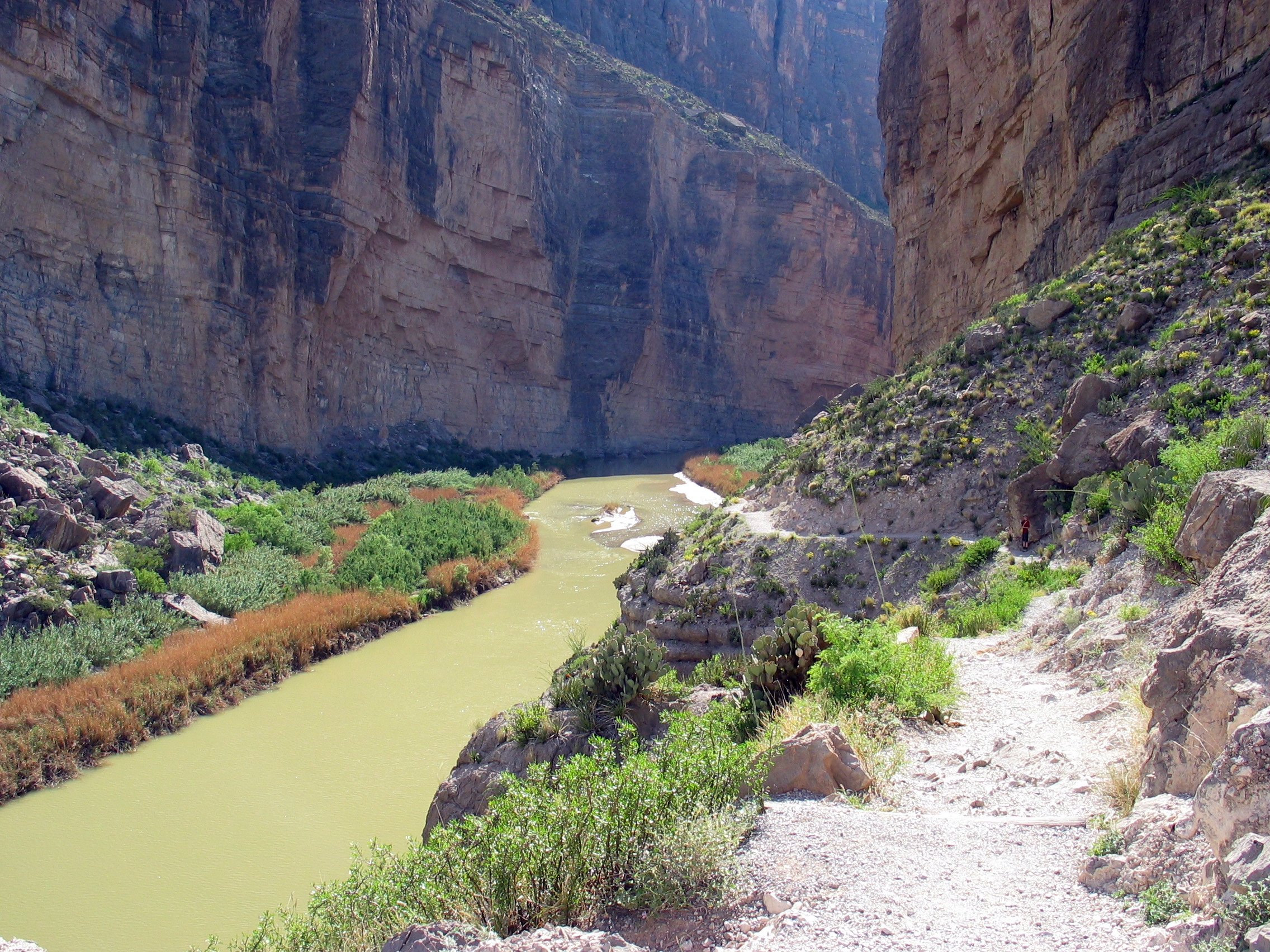
The Rio Grande running through Santa Elena Canyon.

In the area, there are several species, of which 79 are protected. Thirteen of these are species of plants, mostly cacti, while the rest are 66 species of wildlife, among which include the black bear, the golden eagle, the peregrine falcon, and the beaver.

The area has a great diversity of vegetation, highlighting the scrub desert microphyll, scrub desert rosetophylous, the pasture, the oak forest and vegetation riparian, and also scrub Guamis, mariola, cenixo and guayacán in addition to mesquite, catnip and huizaches. In the region with resetófila vegetation, lechuguilla, sotol and various species of cactus develop. Moreover, there is riparian vegetation consisting of poplars and willows. (Note: The riparian vegetation is the one located on the banks of rivers.)

In the desert scrub microphyll, various species such as Creosote bush (Larrea tridentata), hojasén (Flourensia cernua), mariola (Parthenium incanum), mesquite (Prosopis glandulosa), ocotillo (Founquieria splendens) and reed (Koeberlinia spinosa), among others may be found. In the desert scrub rosetophylous, there are species such as palm (Yucca rostrata), lechuguilla (Agave lechugilla), maguey (Agave spp), among others. In the grasslands, there are species such as penknives (Bouteloua gracilis) or the curly mesquite (Hilaria belangeri), among others. This table groups vegetation protection area are based on its altitude and its botanical composition.

Group of vegetation	Altitude (m)	Appearance ranges (m)	Area (ha.)	Area (%)
Larrea tridentata Jatropha dioica Prosopis glandulosa	600–900	300	96,311.7	34.6
Jatropha dioica Porlieria angustifolia Larrea tridentata	900–1000	100	52,611.8	18.9
Jatropha dioica constricta acacia Larrea tridentata	1000–1200	200	53,670.4	19.2
Jatropha dioica Acacia constricta Parthenium incanum	1200–1300	100	14,084.1	5.1
Acacia constricta Viguiera stenoloba Mimosa wherryana	1300–1600	300	48,266.05	17.3
Heteropogon contortus Bouteloua curtipendula Dasylirion leiophyllum	1600–1800	200	9,969.8	3.6
Bouteloua gracilis Pinus cembroides Juniperus monosperma	1800–2100	300	2,622.3	0.9
Bouteloua gracilis Pinus cembroides Quercus grisea	2100–2300	200	731.6	0.3
Muhlenbergia monticola Pinus cembroides Quercus grisea Bouteloua gracilis	2300–2400	100	65.1	0.02

The fauna of the region is composed by birds and mammals that have adapted to aridity. Among the species that inhabit the area are the black-tailed jackrabbit, the bobcat (Lynx rufus), the whitetail deer (Odocoileus virginianus), the mule deer (Odocoileus hemionus), the collared peccary (Tayassu tajacu), mourning doves, some ducks and coyotes. There are also birds of prey like peregrine falcon (Falcao peregrinus), the kestrel (Falco sparverius) and the golden eagle (Aquila chrysaetos). In addition, the presence of songbirds and ornamental birds stands out, and several species of fish.

== Creating the protected area ==
In 1990, at the request of the Government of the State of Chihuahua, the process for creating a Biosphere Reserve in Northwest state of Chihuahua was initiated, bordering with the Big Bend National Park in United States. After some meetings with villagers and local authorities, the region was declared a Protected Area of Flora and Fauna in 1994. This protected area was included within the area of the Forest Protected Area, and declared in 1934, with the aim of conserving irrigation watersheds, protecting the flow of the Amistad Reservoir in Coahuila.

The Federal government of the United States had pushed, since 1934, for the creation of a protected area in Mexico to be the counterpart of Big Bend National Park. These initiatives were not considered for various reasons until 1994, except for the creation of the Department of Forest Protection enacted in 1934.

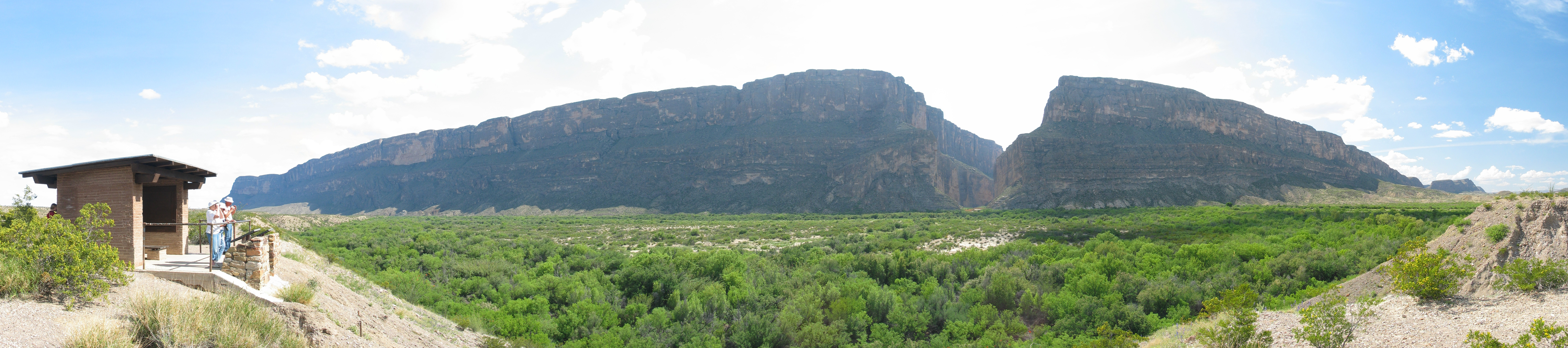
The Rio Grande, as it emerges from the Santa Elena Canyon. The left wall of the canyon is in Mexico and the right is in the US.

== Threats to the reserve ==
The protected area is affected by various threats, all being caused by humans. These may be environmental, due to the excesses committed by the settlers on the resources of pasture, with an overload of ranching and cattle. Also, some people are clearing land for new crops, thus losing native plant species. Another threat is the mining exploitation, using materials extracted for works and services. There is also the plant smuggling, especially cactus, fossils and other archaeological artifacts used by the ancient inhabitants of the area. A looming threat is unchecked tourism, which can inadvertently damage parts of the reserve.

== Goals ==
This reserve was created with the aim of having a protected area that represented the ecological area known as Chihuahuan desert, where counterpart of protected areas border of Texas, being able to extend the protection of ecosystems and conducting joint actions in ecological matters. A study of Autonomous University of Chihuahua conducted in 1994 also argues that the region should be protected because it has a considerable amount of endangered species (13 species of flora and 66 of fauna) and a large geological, hydrological and historical heritage, and a striking contrast between the ecosystems of desert and forest.

== See also ==
- Mexico–United States international park

== Bibliography ==
- "Management Program Area of Protection of Flora and Fauna Santa Elena Canyon, Mexico" (PDF) (in Spanish). Mexico, DF: National Institute of Ecology. July 1997.
