= Ocampo Flora and Fauna Protection Area =

Protected area in northern Mexico

- IUCN category VI (protected area with sustainable use of natural resources)
- Location within Mexico
- Location: Ocampo, Coahuila, Mexico
- Coordinates: 28°48′00″N 103°00′00″W
- Area: 344,238 ha (1,329.11 sq mi)
- Designation: flora and fauna protection area
- Designated: 2009
- Administrator: National Commission of Natural Protected Areas

Ocampo Flora and Fauna Protection Area is a protected area in northern Mexico. It covers an area of 3442.38 km^{2} in the state of Coahuila.

It is bounded on the north by the Rio Grande, which forms the border with the United States. It adjoins Maderas del Carmen Biosphere Reserve on the west, Cañón de Santa Elena Flora and Fauna Protection Area to the east, and Big Bend National Park to the north across the Rio Grande. Together these protected areas form the Mexico-United States international park, also known as El Carmen Big Bend Complex, a proposed transboundary protected area which protects a significant portion of the eastern Chihuahuan Desert and the Rio Grande valley.

== Flora and Fauna ==
According to the National Biodiversity Information System of Comisión Nacional para el Conocimiento y Uso de la Biodiversidad (CONABIO) in Ocampo Flora and Fauna Protection Area there are over 515 plant and animal species from which 39 are in at risk category and 14 are exotics.
