= Roosevelt Reservation =

Land owned by the US government along the US–Mexico Border

Coordinates: 31°47′01″N 107°31′27″W

The Roosevelt Reservation is the 60-foot-wide (18 m) strip of land owned by the United States' federal government along the U.S. side of the U.S.–Mexico Border in California, Arizona, and New Mexico. Federal and tribal lands make up 632 miles (1,017 km), or about one-third, of the nearly 2,000 miles (3,200 km) of border. Private and state-owned lands constitute the remaining 67 percent of the border, most of which is located in Texas.

== History ==
In 1907, Theodore Roosevelt in a Presidential Proclamation (35 Stat. 2136) established the reservation in order to keep all public lands along the border in California, Arizona, and New Mexico "free from obstruction as a protection against the smuggling of goods between the United States and Mexico". Texas was excluded because Texas retained all public lands upon the Texas annexation and admittance as a state, much of which has been sold over the years to private parties.

In 2019, the Trump administration announced a three-year transfer of land within the reservation from the Department of the Interior to the Department of Defense, for the construction of 70 miles (110 km) of border wall. Construction of the Mexico–United States border wall along the border in the states of California, Arizona, and New Mexico was expedited since the reservation reduced the need to acquire additional private property.

In January 2025 the United States Northern Command activated military police and combat engineer units from the Army and Marine Corps to support United States Customs and Border Protection on the border. In March 2025, the newly formed Joint Task Force-Southern Border, from the headquarters of the 10th Mountain Division, took over control of the operation along border, to oversee joint forces and serve as the NORTHCOM land component command for the mission, which involves about 10,000 service members. The headquarters for Joint Task Force-Southern Border is Fort Huachuca.

In April 2025, President Trump released a memorandum directing the U.S. military to take control of the rest of public land on the Roosevelt Reservation from the Interior Department to enhance security and facilitate building border barriers, citing various threats to the nation. The Roosevelt Reservation along with other land was designated a 170-mile-long (270 km) National Defense Area. In December, the transfer of roughly 760 acres (310 ha) in California was announced.

On June 16, 2026, the Tohono Oʼodham Nation sued the Department of Homeland Security to prevent construction of the Mexico-United States border wall on tribal lands along the United States-Mexico border. The first federal court hearing was held on July 22, 2026 in the United States District Court for the District of Columbia. On August 7, 2026, Tribal officials put the community on alert that federal contractors may attempt to enter the Nation's lands to begin construction work and posted "No Trespassing" signage. On August 14, 2026, Senior U.S. District Judge Richard J. Leon denied the Nation's request to block the federal government from starting construction on 62 miles of border wall across the tribe's reservation. Judge Leon's ruling held that the 60-foot strip of land at the border designated by President Theodore Roosevelt in 1907 constituted a public reservation and therefore permitted construction of the border wall.

== See also ==
- Border War (1910–1919)
- List of Mexico–United States border crossings
