= Shafter, Texas =

- Ghost town
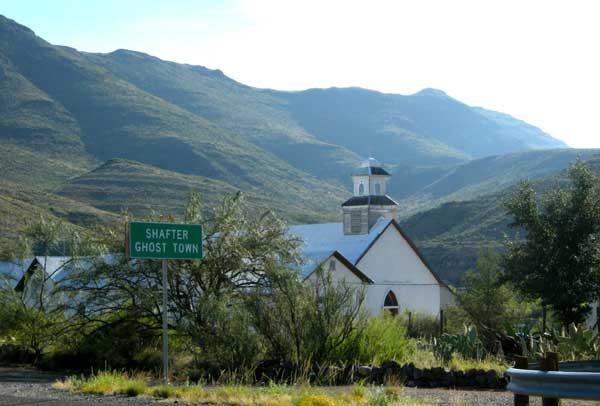
- "Shafter Ghost Town", with Sacred Heart of Jesus Catholic Church
- Nickname: Shafter Ghost Town
- Location within Texas
- Coordinates: 29°49′13″N 104°18′12″W
- Country: United States
- State: Texas
- County: Presidio
- Elevation: 3,901 ft (1,189 m)
- Time zone: UTC-6 (Central (CST))
  - Summer (DST): UTC-5 (CDT)
- ZIP codes: 79843
- Area code: 432
- GNIS feature ID: 1380523

- Shafter Historic Mining District
- U.S. National Register of Historic Places
- U.S. Historic district
- Location: 20 mi. N of Presidio on US 67, Shafter, Texas
- Area: 300 acres (120 ha)
- NRHP reference No.: 76002058
- Added to NRHP: May 17, 1976

Shafter is a ghost town in Presidio County, Texas, United States. The Texas Attorney General's Office listed a population of 11 as of the 2000 Census. It was named in honor of General William R. Shafter, who at one point commanded the nearby Fort Davis. As of 2012, at least one silver mine, La Mina Grande, had been reopened by Aurcana Corporation. In October, the James Bay Mining Company announced that it had acquired the Shafter Silver Mine from Aurcana.

It is listed on the National Register of Historic Places as the Shafter Historic Mining District. As of 2026, a well-funded plan is underway to turn the town into a tourist attraction.

== History ==
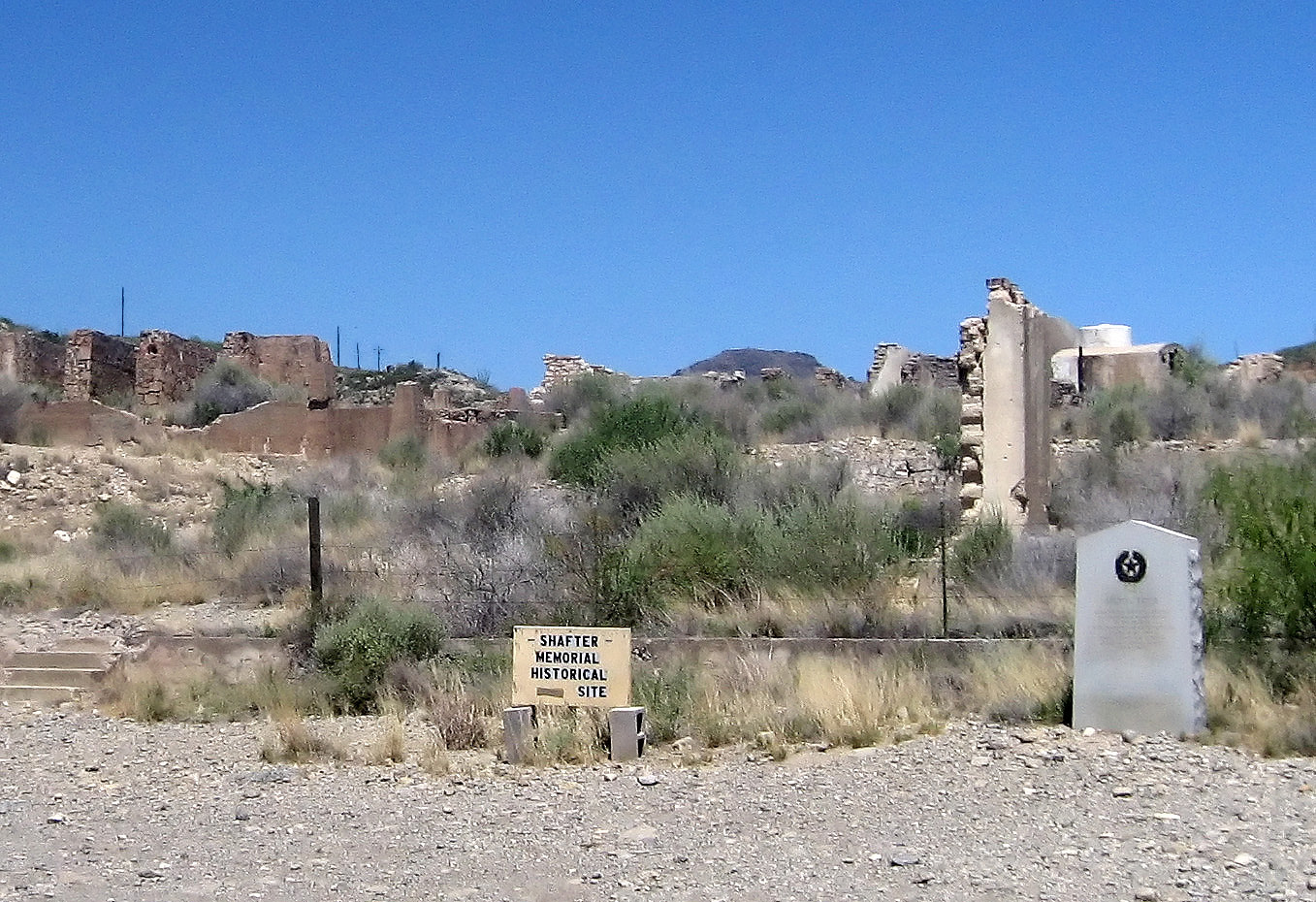
Ruins of silver mining at Shafter, Texas, now a ghost town

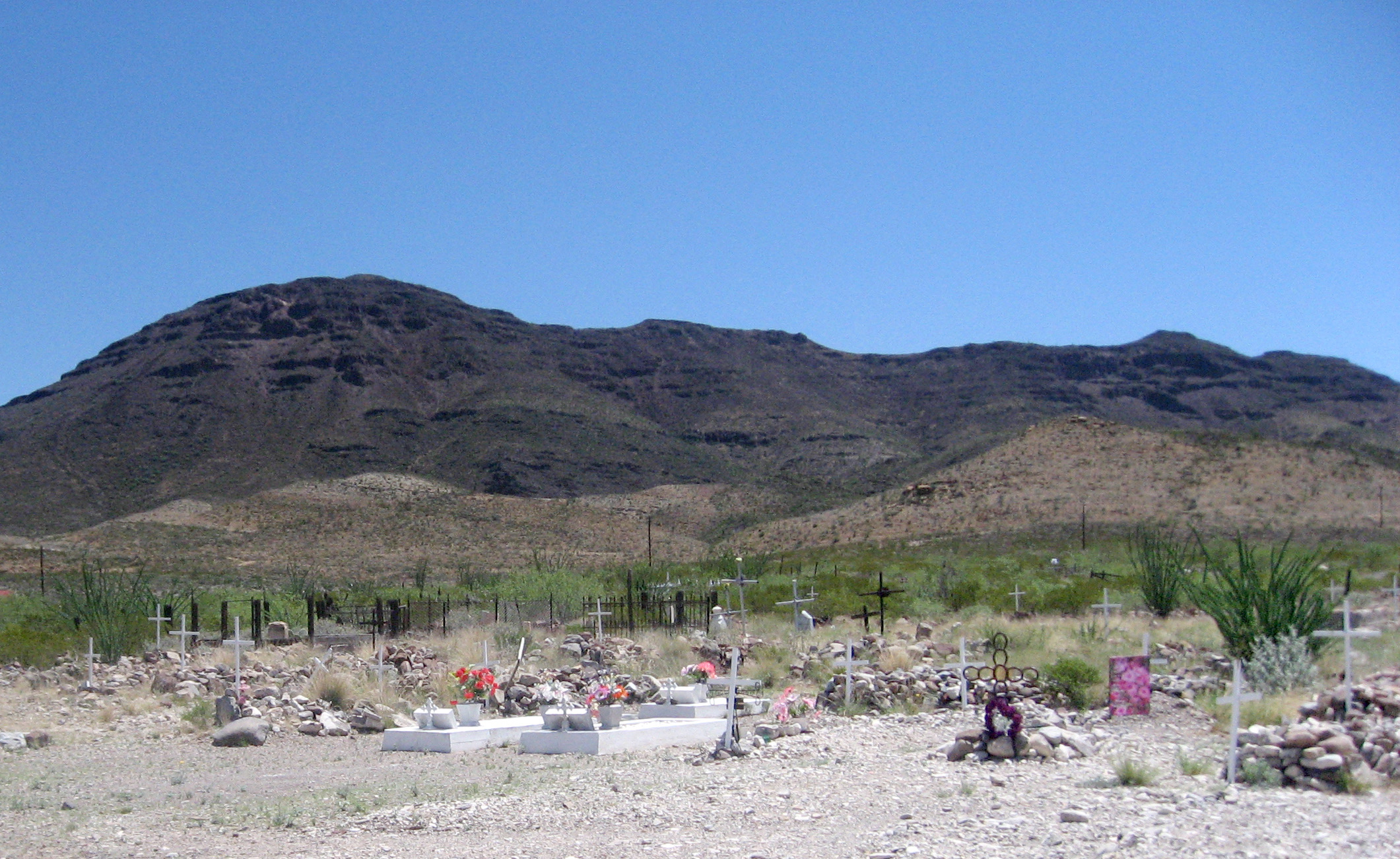
Shafter Town Cemetery

Tucked in the Chinati Mountains on Cibolo Creek, 18 miles (29 km) north of Presidio, Shafter was once a bustling mining town with a population as high as 4000, in 1940.

In 1880 or 1881, John Spencer found silver deposits near this location. Capt. (later Gen.) William R. Shafter, stationed at Fort Davis, and Spencer collaborated to establish the mining operation. This operation consisted of the Cibolo Creek Mill and Mining Company and the Presidio Mining Company, both of which were consolidated as the Presidio Mining Company. The Mina Grande orebody was producing by 1883. The ore, 30 ounces (850 g) of silver per ton, was treated in a 50-ton pan amalgamation mill. Annual production from 1898 to 1913 was 20,000 tons. In 1913, a 200-ton cyanide mill was added. Annual production from 1913 to 1926 was 84,000 tons, with 10 ounces (280 g) of silver per ton.

When an assay commissioned by Colonel Shafter confirmed profitable amounts of silver were in Spencer's ore samples, he brought in two of his military associates, Lt. John L. Bullis and Lt. Louis Wilhelmi, to join the venture. Each would contribute, first, by acquiring acreage around Spencer's discovery. In all, four sections of land, or 2,560 acres (1,040 ha), were acquired. Spencer and they agreed they would all share equally in profits from the venture. Then, in June 1882, lacking sufficient capital to develop the acreage on their own, the partners leased a portion of their holdings to a mining group from California, which had both the money and expertise to proceed. In 1883, this group established the Presidio Mining Company, which, in turn, contracted with three of the partners to acquire their interests in a stock-for-land trade. Shafter, Wilhelmi, and Spencer received 5,000 shares and a bonus of $1,600 in cash to complete the trade. Bullis, asserting that his purchase money to buy the acreage had been from his wife's account, refused to join the transaction. This later was cause for dispute. Nevertheless, development proceeded and a settlement began to grow around the mining operation. A post office opened in 1885 and took the name "Shafter" after the colonel. Company housing was provided for the miners. Company stores provided their staples, and a company doctor provided medical care.

The American Metal Co. of Texas acquired the property in 1926. Operations ceased from July 1930 until 1934 due to low silver prices. By 1940, the quality of the ore was 10.7 ounces (300 g) of silver per ton. The recorded production of the Presidio Mine between 1883 and 1940 was 30,972,286.15 ounces (878,049,542 g) of silver. Production from 1927 to 1940 alone was 11,809,163.8 ounces (334,784,160 g) of silver, 5,406 ounces (153,300 g) of gold, and 7,678,049.8 ounces (217,669,050 g) of lead.

United States Supreme Court Justice Antonin Scalia died at nearby Cibolo Creek Ranch on February 13, 2016.

== Geology ==
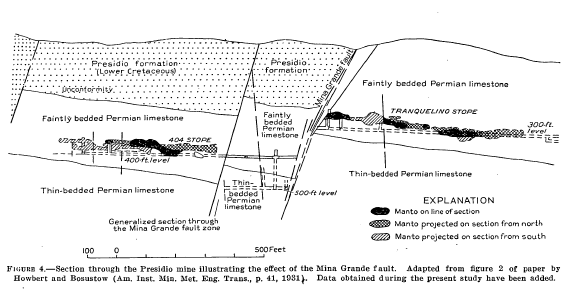
Presidio Mine Cross Section

At the Presidio Mine, which started operation in 1880, the Permian Cibolo limestone formation is overlain unconformably by the Presidio formation, a massive dark-grey Cretaceous limestone. The Shafter limestone rests unconformably on the Presidio formation. Ore deposits are found in the Permian limestone and consist of supergene replacement minerals argentite and cerargyrite along the bedding. Veins and replacement mineralization are present in the overlying Cretaceous beds. Lodes in the Permian limestone include Manto ore deposits and thrust fault deposits, while those in the Cretaceous rocks are steep veins along normal faults. Smaller mines have operated in the district at various times, but the Presidio remains the largest and most continuous.

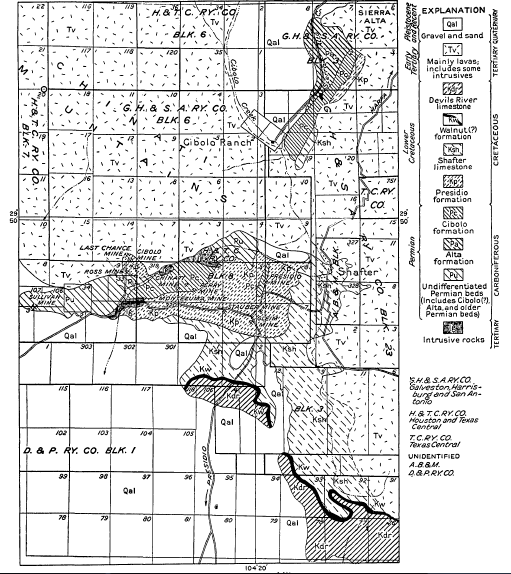
Shafter Region geological map

== Decline ==
In the 1940s, faced with increased production costs, a shortage of miners, and an attempt to unionize those who were employed, the American Metal Company simply shut down its operation.

Even so, as the businesses established there also catered to the two military bases in the county, Marfa Army Air Field and Fort D.A. Russell, Shafter continued to support a population of some 1,500. When Marfa Air Field closed in December 1945 and Fort Russell in 1946, Shafter went into rapid decline.

Today, Shafter is home to only a few families, and over the past several decades, has registered a population ranging from 11 to 30 persons.

== Possible revival ==
According to Fortune in September 2026, foundations associated with billionaire John Poindexter are funneling some of his wealth into a plan to turn the town into a tourist attraction. A resort and living history museum are to be anchored by a reconstructed saloon and general store. The plan calls for around 12 adobe homes to be built for overnight guest stays.

== Education ==
Shafter is zoned to schools in the Marfa Independent School District.

== In popular culture ==
Part of the 1971 film The Andromeda Strain was filmed on location in Shafter, which featured as the fictional ill-fated village of Piedmont in New Mexico.

The opening scenes of the 2007 film There Will Be Blood were filmed at the Presidio mine in Shafter.

== See also ==
- National Register of Historic Places listings in Presidio County, Texas
- Shafter silver-mining district
