= Milton Faver =

American cattleman (c. 1822–1889)

- Born: 1822
- Died: 1889 (aged 66–67)
- Occupation: Rancher

Milton Faver (c. 1822–1889) was a pioneering cattle rancher in Presidio County, Texas, the preeminent cattle baron of the Big Bend in the nineteenth century, and one of the most important individual contributors to Big Bend history. Also known in his time by the honorary title, don Melitón, he founded Cibolo Creek Ranch halfway between Marfa and Presidio, Texas in 1857. He was one of the earliest Texas trail drivers, driving his cattle to market in New Orleans in the 1850s and to other markets later. Although his birthplace is not known with certainty, he was most likely born and raised in Missouri around 1822. Local lore contends that, while in his teens, he fought a duel and fled south, believing he had killed his opponent.

== Early Business Days ==
Faver made his way to Meoqui, Chihuahua, Mexico, married Señorita Francisca Ramírez, and began a freighting business. It was a modest beginning, with a single cart of Mexican goods which he transported to and sold in Texas. He brought the cart back filled with American goods to sell in Mexico. He soon began freighting along the Chihuahua Trail and the Santa Fe Trail. As his business prospered, he opened a mercantile business in Presidio del Norte. He established regular trade with Fort Davis, the US Army cavalry post founded in 1854 in the Davis Mountains to protect the Overland Trail to California. Recognizing the business opportunity that Fort Davis offered, Faver acquired land on Cíbolo Creek, the site of a Cibolo Indian village before the arrival of Europeans in the area. It was likely the site of a Spanish mission to the Cibolos, Mission Santa María de las Caldas.

== Defensive Forts ==
Faver built the first of his three adobe forts, El Fortín del Cíbolo, in 1857, as a defensive measure against Apaches, Comanches, and bandits of all kinds. His ranching empire boasted as many as 20,000 longhorns—some say as many as 100,000—irrigated farms, and herds of sheep and goats, making him the preeminent pioneer rancher of the Big Bend. El Fortín del Cíbolo (the Fort on Cíbolo Creek) was Faver’s stronghold, where he operated a sizable farming enterprise irrigated by Cibolo Springs. Faver later built El Fortín de la Ciénega (the Fort at the Marsh), where he headquartered his cattle operation, and El Fortín de la Morita (the Fort at the Little Mulberry Tree), which became the center of his sheep and goat operations. His vast enterprise not only supplied beef but also farm produce and his famous peach brandy to cavalry troops at Fort Davis, settlers in the region, and after silver was discovered, to the miners in Shafter, next door.

His ranch withstood the withdrawal of Union and Confederate troops during Civil War times and the resulting onslaught of Apaches and Comanches until the return of the US Army in 1867. During the tumultuous times of the latter 1800s, Faver managed to keep the inhabitants of his colony faithful and active in the defense of his settlements. Continued trade with Fort Davis supplied Union troops at the fort, supporting their stay in the region, and ensured continued settlement of the area until the advent of the railroad. He was an early pioneer in Texas cattle drives and is thought by some to be the inspiration for the television character Gil Faver on Rawhide. Upon his death in 1889, Faver was buried in an adobe tomb on Cibolo Creek Ranch.

== Recent history ==
The ranch thereafter passed through several owners over the years and finally succumbed to picturesque ruin prior to its purchase in 1990 by John Poindexter, who restored all three of Faver’s adobe forts and built a resort at Cíbolo Creek Ranch.

== Additional Sources ==
- Historical Marker Society of America, "Milton Faver," (1) Historical marker text, , accessed March 4, 2011.
- Historical Marker Society of America, "Milton Faver," (2) Historical marker text, , accessed March 4, 2011.
- Historical Marker Society of America, "Milton Faver Ranches," Historical marker text, , accessed March 4, 2011.
- Historical Marker Society of America, "El Fortin del Cibolo," Historical marker text, , accessed March 4,

2011.

- Historical Marker Society of America, "El Fortin de la Cienega," Historical marker text, , accessed March 4, 2011.
- Historical Marker Society of America, "La Morita Ranch," Historical marker text, , accessed March 4, 2011.
- National Register of Historic Places, El Fortin del Cibolo Historic District.
- National Register of Historic Places, El Fortin de la Cienega Historic District.
- Interior Department, National Park Service, Big Bend, National Park Handbook 119, page 50. Washington: United States Government Printing Office.
