= Hans Jürgen Press =

German illustrator and children's writer

Hans Jürgen Press (1926 – 2002) was a German illustrator and writer of children's books. Many of his books contain stories and puzzles in which the reader searches the illustrations for clues to the mystery.

== Biography ==
Press was born in Klein Konopken, East Prussia. He served for about four months during World War II, when he was captured in France and transported to Marseille, where he was shipped to Oran. After three or four days he was transported to the United States. Press was trained as an unarmed sail plane glider pilot. While a prisoner of war at Ft. D.A. Russell in Texas, he painted detailed murals of far West Texas mountain scenes at Building 98 in Marfa, Texas. The murals are on the National Register of Historic Places. He departed Marfa, Texas, in 1945 while there he created two west Texas watercolors of local residents one performing a Spanish dance and another playing the Spanish guitar.

He returned from captivity to Hamburg in 1948 and attended the Hochschule für Bildende Künste. In 1953 he began to illustrate for "sternchen", the children's supplement of German magazine stern. He invented Der kleine Herr Jakob, a little man with moustache and bowler hat who never talked but whose comic strips were commented in verse. The Adventures of the Black Hand Gang was a combination of story and illustration which appeared in weekly chapters, the solution to this week's riddle was given the next week.

Press was one of the inventors of the "Wimmelbild", a genre of illustration deliberately overcrowded with detail, to please children on their search for a certain item. He also wrote and illustrated books about science and numerous puzzle and play books for children.

His son, Julian Press, is also an author and illustrator.

== Bibliography ==
- The Adventures of the Black Hand Gang - 1976
- On the trail of nature: Observations in nature. Studying animals and plants - 1972
- The Hot Lead: Over 50 Mystery Stories and Picture Puzzles
- Hot on the Trail (Detective Quest)
- Little Mr. Jacob
- A game that creates knowledge: With over 400 experiments for observing nature - 1974
- The Big Puzzle Book for Detectives: Exciting Search, Puzzle and Hidden Picture Puzzles
- Little Mr. Jacob - Big on a Roll!: 180 Picture Stories
- The Big Picture Puzzle Book: Mystery Puzzles, Thinking Puzzles, Search Puzzles and Hidden Object Puzzles
- The Little Giant Book of Science Experiments
- Secrets of everyday life: Discoveries in nature and technology - 1983
- The great 1000-point fun: Over 150 point puzzles
- The Monkey Gang (The Owl Detective)
- Little Fermín - 1976
- Simple Experiments With Forces And Waves
- Simple Experiments in Botany and Zoology
- Riddles and Mystery Words to Play All Year Round
- Playing with natural sciences: 200 easy and curious experiments
- 75 Riddles for Clever Sleuths
- 1000 Points: With Little Bears - 1974
- 1000 Points: On Safari
- 1000 points: At the Zoo - 1966
- 1000 points: At the Circus - 1967
- 1000 Points: In the City
- 1000 points: From the surprise bag
- My December book: Games and puzzles for the Christmas season
- Puzzle fun all about school
- A puzzle journey through the year
