= Fort D. A. Russell =

Fort D. A. Russell was the name of two United States Military posts:

- Fort D. A. Russell (Wyoming), in Cheyenne
- Fort D. A. Russell (Texas), Marfa, Texas
