= Cibolo Creek Ranch =

Historic place in Texas, US

- El Fortin del Cibolo Historic District
- U.S. National Register of Historic Places
- U.S. Historic district
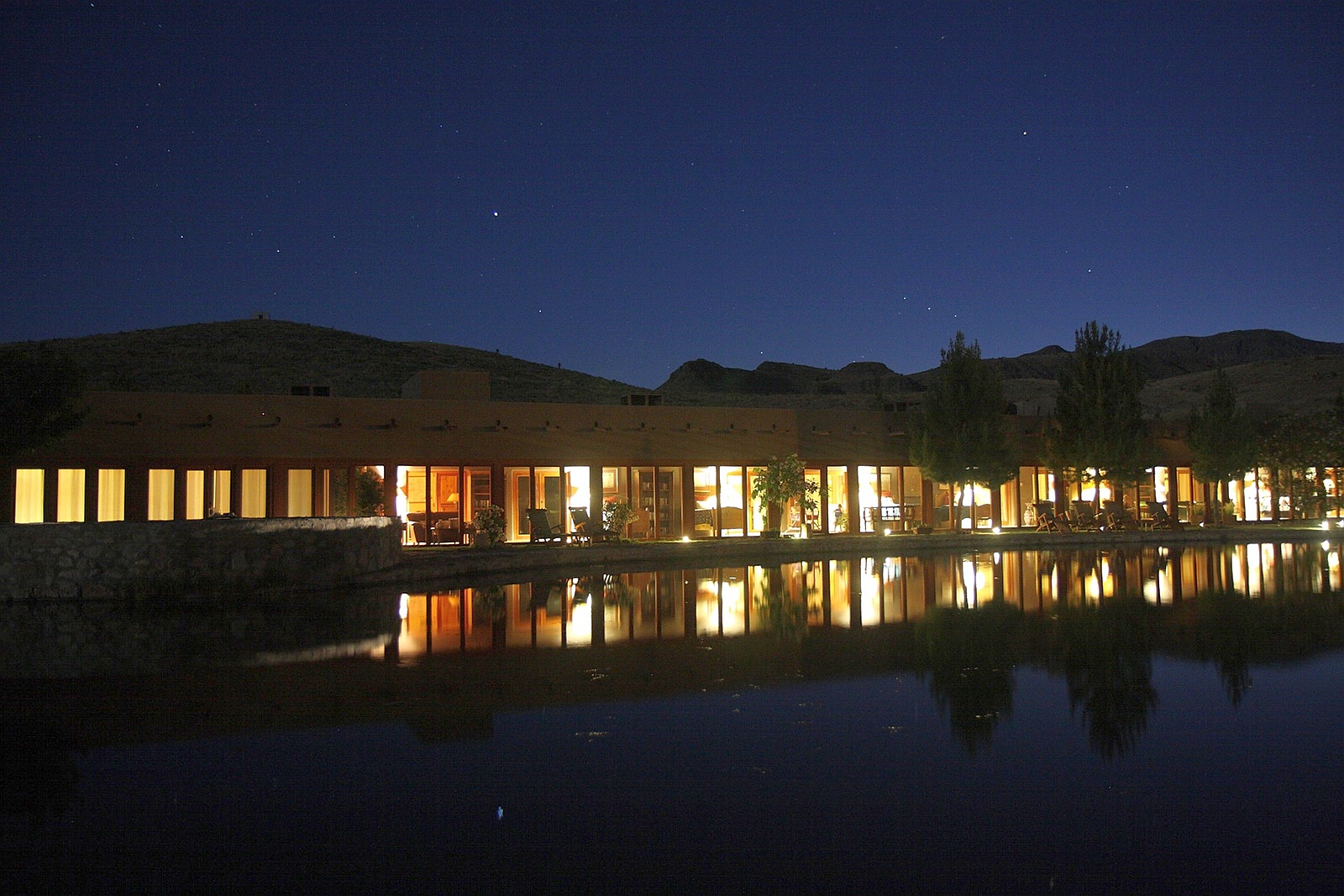
- Nightfall at Cibolo Creek Ranch

- Location within Texas Location within the United States
- Nearest city: Shafter, Texas
- Coordinates: 29°51′43″N 104°20′1″W
- Area: 606.6 acres (245.5 ha)
- Built: 1865
- Built by: Milton Faver
- MPS: Historic Resources Associated with Milton Faver, Agriculturist, MPS
- NRHP reference No.: 95000366
- Added to NRHP: April 6, 1995

Cibolo Creek Ranch is a historic place in Presidio County, Texas, United States. Established as a cattle ranch prior to the Civil War, it has been used in modern times for hunting and a shooting location for the movie industry. It includes a fort called El Fortin del Cibolo which has been renovated as a luxury hotel featuring watchtowers and three-foot-thick adobe walls.

== Location ==
The ranch is situated in the Chinati Mountains of the Chihuahuan Desert, near Shafter, Texas, approximately 15 miles (24 km) east of the Mexico–United States border. It spans 30,000 acres (12,000 ha), and U.S. Route 67 passes through the property.

The Cibolo Creek Ranch Airport is located 3.5 mi (5.6 km) northeast of the hotel.

== History ==
- Fortin de la Cienega
- U.S. National Register of Historic Places
- Location within Texas Location within the United States
- Nearest city: Shafter, Texas
- Coordinates: 29°48′13″N 104°12′41″W
- Area: 9 acres (3.6 ha)
- Built: 1854
- Built by: Milton Faver
- NRHP reference No.: 76002059
- Added to NRHP: October 8, 1976

- La Morita Historic District
- U.S. National Register of Historic Places
- U.S. Historic district
- Location within Texas Location within the United States
- Nearest city: Shafter, Texas
- Coordinates: 29°46′51″N 104°15′16″W
- Area: 116.2 acres (47.0 ha)
- Built: 1865
- Built by: Milton Faver
- MPS: Historic Resources Associated with Milton Faver, Agriculturist, MPS
- NRHP reference No.: 95000367
- Added to NRHP: April 6, 1995

Milton Faver established the ranch in the 1850s and built three adobe forts, called El Cibolo, La Cienega, and La Morita, for defense against the Apache people who refused to leave the land. He raised 200,000 Texas Longhorn cattle.

The ranch has been used by the movie industry since the 1950s. For example, Giant was shot on the ranch in 1956. More recently, it was used as a shooting location for The Three Burials of Melquiades Estrada in 2005, followed by There Will Be Blood and No Country for Old Men in 2007.

The ranch was purchased by John B. Poindexter, the founder and chief executive officer of Houston-based manufacturing firm J.B. Poindexter & Co. Poindexter turned the historic forts into luxury hotel rooms. The grounds are used for big game and bird hunting. It hosted a gathering of members of the International Order of St. Hubertus, a male-only fraternity of hunters, in 2010.

A wildfire spread across 1,700 acres (690 ha) of the ranch in 1994.

In May 1999, the ranch hosted the wedding of country musicians Charlie Robison and Emily Robison of the Dixie Chicks.

U.S. Supreme Court Justice Antonin Scalia died at the ranch in 2016. Among his fellow guests at the ranch were members of the International Order of St. Hubertus.

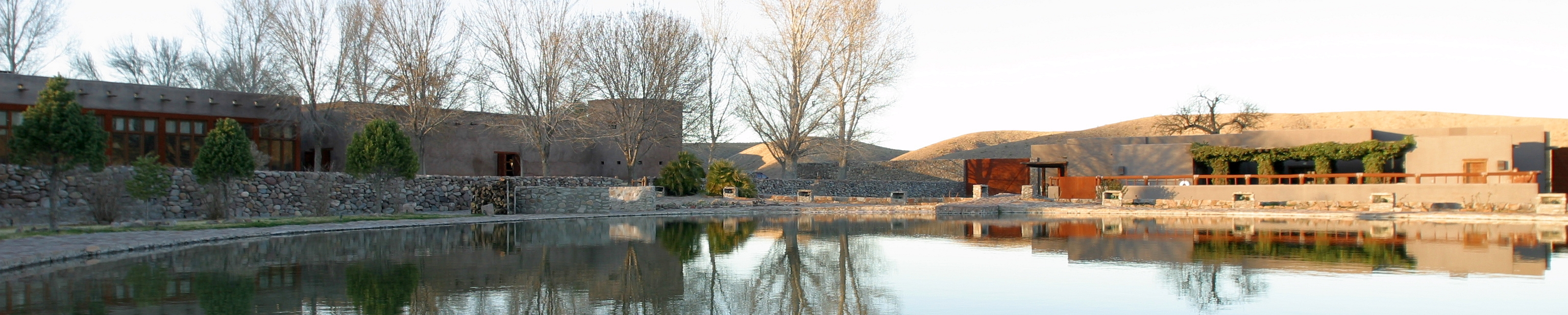
Cibolo Creek Ranch in 2008

== See also ==
- National Register of Historic Places listings in Presidio County, Texas
- Recorded Texas Historic Landmarks in Presidio County
