= Plata, Texas =

- unincorporated community
- Location within Texas
- Coordinates: 29°52′34″N 104°01′3″W
- Country: United States
- State: Texas
- County: Presidio
- Elevation: 3,790 ft (1,160 m)
- Time zone: UTC-6 (Central (CST))
  - Summer (DST): UTC-5 (CDT)
- ZIP codes: 79843
- Area code: 432
- GNIS feature ID: 1380371

Plata is an unincorporated community in Presidio County, Texas, on Ranch to Market Road 169 approximately 25 miles south of the county seat of Marfa. The population at the 2000 census was 37.

Plata is Spanish for "silver."

== Education ==
Plata is zoned to schools in the Marfa Independent School District.

== Climate ==
This area has a large amount of sunshine year round due to its stable descending air and high pressure. According to the Köppen Climate Classification system, Plata has a desert climate, abbreviated BWh on climate maps.
