= National Register of Historic Places listings in Presidio County, Texas =

Location of Presidio County in Texas

This is a list of the National Register of Historic Places in Presidio County, Texas

This is intended to be a complete list of properties and districts listed on the National Register of Historic Places in Presidio County, Texas. There are six districts and seven individual properties listed on the National Register in the county. One site is also a Texas State Historic Site while four others are Recorded Texas Historic Landmarks including one State Antiquities Landmark.

This National Park Service list is complete through NPS recent listings posted March 27, 2026.

== Current listings ==
The publicly disclosed locations of National Register properties and districts may be seen in a mapping service provided.

	Name on the Register	Image	Date listed	Location	City or town	Description
1	Blackwell School	Blackwell School	December 4, 2019 (#100004751)	501 South Abbot St. 30°18′21″N 104°01′20″W	Marfa	
2	Building 98, Fort D.A. Russell	Building 98, Fort D.A. Russell	February 25, 2004 (#04000100)	W. Bonnie St. 30°18′11″N 104°01′39″W	Marfa	Recorded Texas Historic Landmark
3	Central Marfa Historic District		April 18, 2022 (#100007597)	Roughly bounded by Washington, Dallas, Dean, Russell, Austin and Abbott Sts. 29°51′43″N 104°20′01″W	Marfa	
4	El Fortin del Cibolo Historic District	El Fortin del Cibolo Historic District	April 6, 1995 (#95000366)	Approximately 4 mi (6.4 km) northwest of Shafter, west of US 67; 29°51′43″N 104°20′01″W	Shafter	Recorded Texas Historic Landmark; now part of Cibolo Creek Ranch
5	El Paisano Hotel	El Paisano Hotel	August 1, 1978 (#78002973)	N. Highland St. and W. Texas St. 30°18′44″N 104°01′19″W	Marfa	Recorded Texas Historic Landmark
6	Fort D.A. Russell Historic District	Fort D.A. Russell Historic District	December 14, 2006 (#06001152)	Roughly bounded by Ridge, El Paso, Kelly streets, US 67, and RM 2810; 30°17′46″N 104°01′47″W	Marfa	Now the Chinati Foundation
7	Fort Leaton	Fort Leaton	June 18, 1973 (#73001972)	4 mi (6.4 km) east of Presidio on FM 170; 29°32′30″N 104°19′36″W	Presidio	State Historic Site (TPWD)
8	Fortin de la Cienega	Fortin de la Cienega	October 8, 1976 (#76002059)	15 mi (24 km) northeast of Shafter on Cienega Creek; 29°48′13″N 104°12′41″W	Shafter	Now part of Cibolo Creek Ranch
9	La Junta de los Rios Archeological District	La Junta de los Rios Archeological District	February 14, 1978 (#78002974)	Address restricted	Presidio	
10	La Morita Historic District		April 6, 1995 (#95000367)	Approximately 5 mi (8.0 km) southwest of Shafter, east of US 67; 29°46′51″N 104°15′16″W	Shafter	Now part of Cibolo Creek Ranch
11	Presidio County Courthouse	Presidio County Courthouse	December 20, 1977 (#77001467)	Public Square; 30°18′48″N 104°01′20″W	Marfa	State Antiquities Landmark; Recorded Texas Historic Landmark
12	Shafter Historic Mining District	Shafter Historic Mining District	May 17, 1976 (#76002058)	20 mi (32 km) north of Presidio on US 67; 29°48′50″N 104°18′24″W	Shafter	
13	Tapalcomes	Tapalcomes	March 25, 1977 (#77001468)	Address restricted	Redford	Polvo site (41PS21)

== See also ==
- National Register of Historic Places listings in Texas
- List of Texas State Historic Sites
- Recorded Texas Historic Landmarks in Presidio County
