= Mitgutsch =

Mitgutsch is a surname. Notable people with the surname include:

- Ali Mitgutsch (1935–2022), German author of picture books
- Anna Mitgutsch (born 1948), Austrian writer and educator
