= Convenience West =

Restaurant in Marfa, Texas, U.S.

- Interactive map of Convenience West

Restaurant information
- Location: 1411 W. San Antonio St., Marfa, Texas, 79843, United States
- Coordinates: 30°18′20″N 104°02′11″W

Convenience West is a restaurant in Marfa, Texas. It opened in 2017, and was a semifinalist in the Outstanding Restaurant category of the James Beard Foundation Awards in 2024.
