= Konopki Małe =

- Village
- Location within Poland
- Coordinates: 53°55′N 21°57′E
- Country: Poland
- Voivodeship: Warmian-Masurian
- County: Giżycko
- Gmina: Miłki

Konopki Małe [kɔˈnɔpki ˈmawɛ] is a village in the administrative district of Gmina Miłki, within Giżycko County, Warmian-Masurian Voivodeship, in northern Poland.

== Notable residents ==
- Hans Jürgen Press (1926–2002), German illustrator and writer of children's books.
