= Marfa Independent School District =

School district in Texas

Coordinates: 30.3120°N 104.0256°W

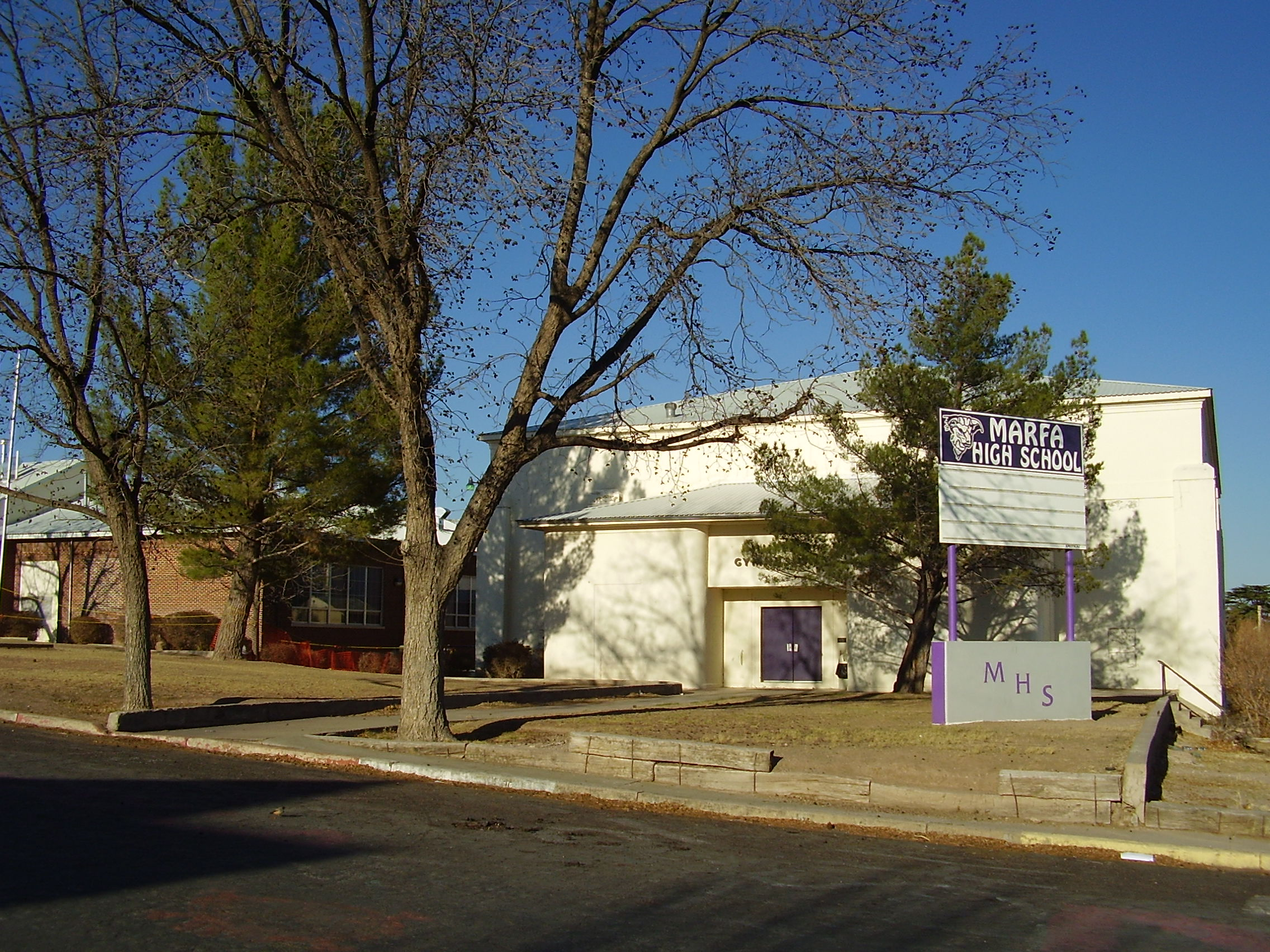
Marfa High School

Marfa Independent School District is a public school district based in Marfa, Texas, United States. In addition to Marfa, the district also serves the CDP of Redford, and the unincorporated communities of Plata and Shafter.

In 2009, the school district was rated "academically acceptable" by the Texas Education Agency.

== Schools ==
- Marfa Junior/Senior High School (grades 7-12)
- Marfa Elementary School (prekindergarten-grade 6)
- Blackwell School (former)

== Special programs ==
=== Athletics ===
Marfa High School plays six-man football.
