= El Paisano Hotel =

- U.S. National Register of Historic Places
- Recorded Texas Historic Landmark
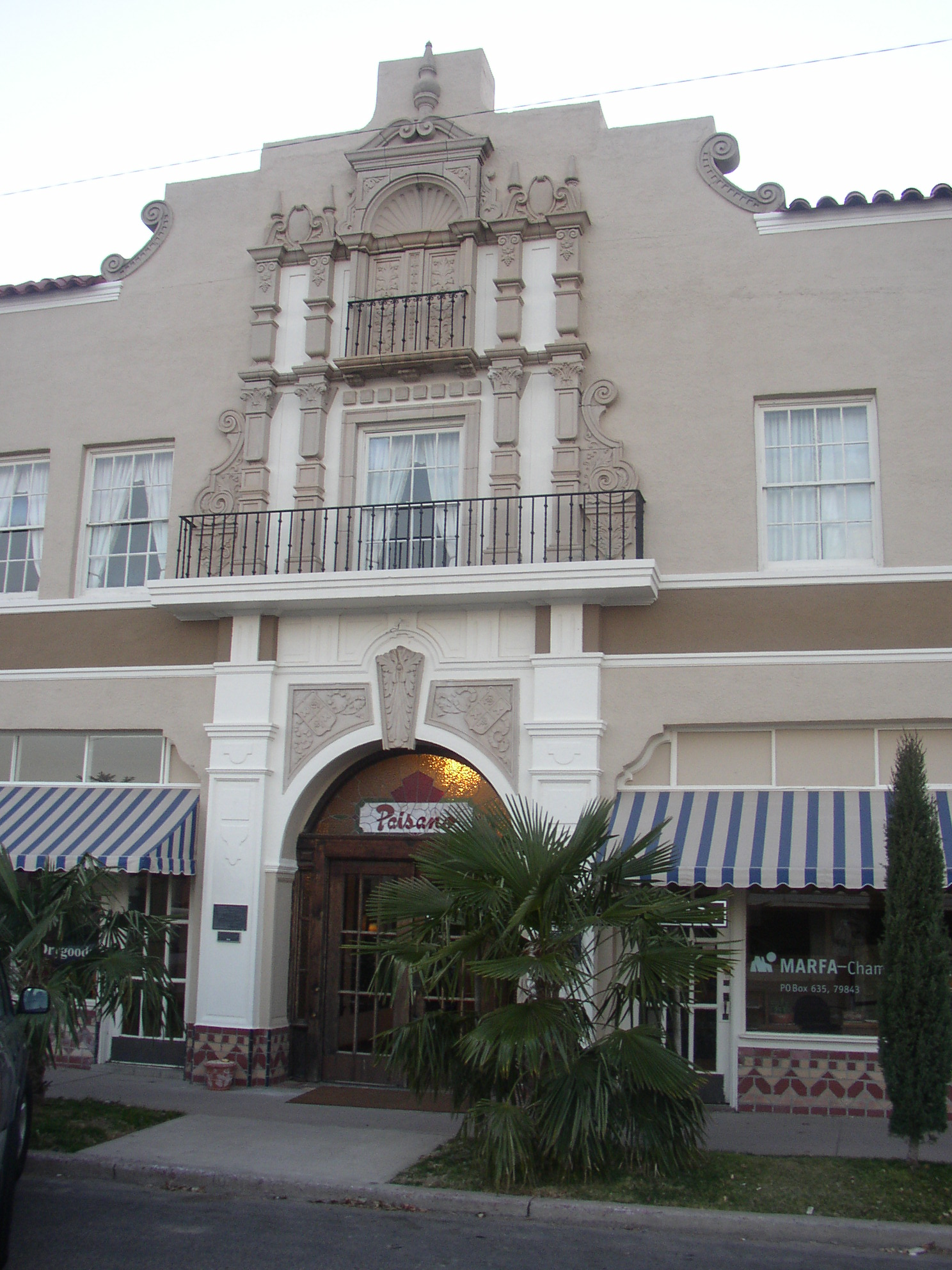
- East entrance of El Paisano Hotel

- Location within Texas Location within the United States
- Location: 207 N Highland; Marfa, Texas
- Coordinates: 30°18′44″N 104°1′19″W
- Area: less than one acre
- Built: 1928
- Architect: Trost & Trost
- Architectural style: Mission/Spanish Revival, Spanish-Baroque
- NRHP reference No.: 78002973
- RTHL No.: 1422

Significant dates
- Added to NRHP: August 1, 1978
- Designated RTHL: 1979

El Paisano Hotel is a historic hotel located in Marfa, Texas, United States. The hotel was designed by Trost & Trost and opened in 1930. The hotel may be best known as the location headquarters for the cast and crew of the film Giant (1956) for six weeks in the summer of 1955. The building was added to the National Register of Historic Places on August 1, 1978.

The El Paisano Hotel was built by Charles N. Bassett of El Paso. It was designed by Henry C. Trost of Trost & Trost of El Paso, Texas in a Spanish Revival style. The hotel is a "U" shape plan with a fifty by fifty foot courtyard with a large fountain in the center.

The main customers of the El Paisano during the 1930s and 1940s were area cattle ranchers who came to Marfa to buy and sell their herds, and tourists who came to West Texas for the benefits of the dry desert air.

In 1955, George Stevens and a Warner Bros film crew came to Presidio County to film Giant. The El Paisano Hotel served as base of operations for the months during which time the film was being shot in the surrounding countryside. Stevens stayed at the El Paisano Hotel as did the 300 plus members of the cast and crew who included: James Dean, Elizabeth Taylor, Rock Hudson, Sal Mineo, Chill Wills, and Jane Withers among others.

Gary and Carolyn Rogers visited from Houston and bought the property in 1970, moving their children, Cynthia Rogers Williams, Melissa Rogers Smith, and Buddy Rogers into the hotel for several years until purchasing a Trost-designed home in Marfa. The hotel enjoyed a thriving restaurant and bar business, and their children enjoyed pottery and piano lessons from two retired ladies who lived permanently in the hotel, as well as parties by the pool. The piano is still in use at the hotel today off the lobby. The Rogers sold the property to Jack Brown of El Paisano Properties Corp. in the late 1970s after Mr. Rogers became a ranch broker.

El Paisano Properties Corp. converted the hotel's 65 rooms into 9 timeshare condominiums. Although 800 timeshare units were sold, the owners eventually abandoned the business and Presidio County foreclosed on the property for back taxes. Joe and Lanna Duncan purchased the property at auction for $185,000 in March 2001. After three years of renovations, the hotel reopened with 33 rooms and suites available for the public.

== See also ==
- National Register of Historic Places listings in Presidio County, Texas
