= International Order of St. Hubertus =

Knightly hunting organization

International Order of St. Hubertus

The International Order of Saint Hubertus is a worldwide organization and chivalric order of hunters and wildlife conservationists under Grand Master Istvan von Habsburg-Lothringen that promotes traditional hunting ethics and practices. The Order was founded in 1695 by Count Franz Anton von Sporck, who brought together noble hunters from Austria, Bohemia, and other countries throughout the Habsburg Empire. The Order was named in honor of Saint Hubertus, the patron saint of hunters and fishermen. The Order's motto is Deum Diligite Animalia Diligentes, "Honoring God by Honoring His Creatures".

== Mission ==
According to the organization's American website, the purpose of the Order is to "promote sportsmanlike conduct in hunting and fishing, foster good fellowship among sportsmen from all over the world", "teach and preserve sound traditional hunting and fishing customs", "encourage wildlife conservation and to help protect endangered species from extinction", "promote the concept of hunting and fishing as an intangible cultural heritage of humanity", "endeavor to ensure that the economic benefits derived from sports hunting and fishing support the regions where these activities are carried out", and "strive to enhance respect for responsible hunters and fishermen".

== History ==
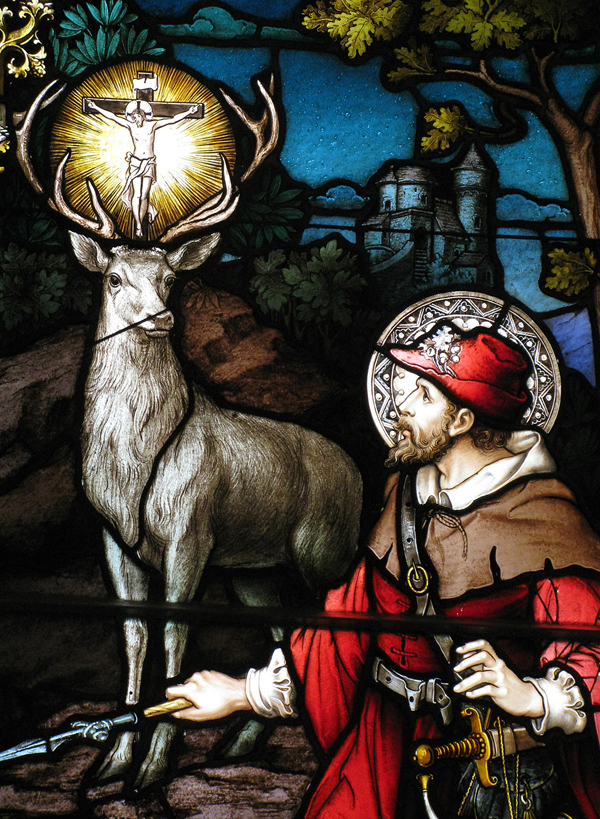
Saint Hubertus depicted in a stained glass window in St. Patrick's Basilica in Ottawa, Canada

The Venerable Order of Saint Hubertus was founded in 1695 by Count Franz Anton von Sporck, who brought together noble hunters from Austria, Bohemia, and other countries throughout the Habsburg Empire. The Order included among its original members Holy Roman Emperor Charles VI and other noble families of the Holy Roman Empire. The Order was named in honor of Saint Hubertus, the patron saint of hunters and fishermen.

In 1938, after nearly 250 years of existence, the Order was banned by Adolf Hitler for refusing to accept Nazis as members after the Anschluss joined Austria to Germany. At the end of World War II, surviving members of the Order were authorized by Halvor O. Ekern, chief political adviser of the United States Armed Forces in Austria, to use their guns to provide food to the rural population in the winter.

The Order was restituted on 1 May 1950 by Albert Franz Messany, at the request of Chancellor Figl of Austria. Messany renamed the organization the International Order of St. Hubertus to better reflect the multi-national character of the Order.

The Order gained media attention in February 2016, when U.S. Supreme Court Justice Antonin Scalia died while staying at Cibolo Creek Ranch in Presidio County in West Texas. The owner of the ranch, John B. Poindexter, as well as C. Allen Foster, a Washington attorney who travelled with Scalia to the ranch by private plane, hold leadership positions within the Order; at least two other private aircraft travelling to the ranch were connected to known members of St. Hubertus. Poindexter indicated that he knew of "no connection" between Scalia and the Order, and that Scalia had travelled to the ranch to go hunting.
