= Wimmelbuch =

Type of wordless picture book

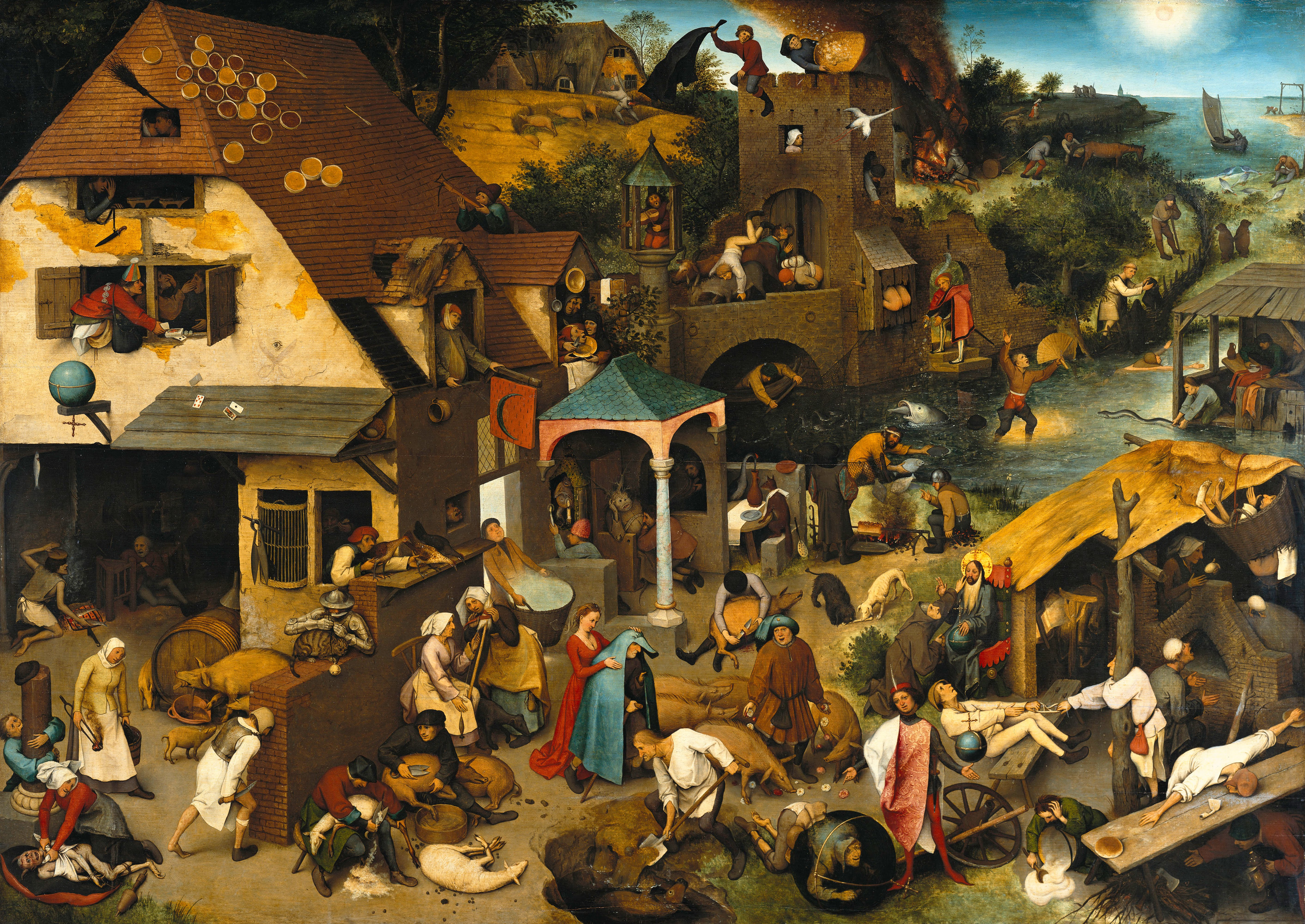
Netherlandish Proverbs painting by Pieter Brueghel the Elder

A Wimmelbilderbuch (German, literally "teeming picture book"), wimmelbook, or hidden picture book is a type of large-format, wordless picture book. It is characterized by full-spread drawings (sometimes across gatefold pages) depicting scenes richly detailed with humans, animals, and objects. Typically made for children, the drawings are filled with characters and items that may be discovered.

While some wimmelbook spreads depict individual scenes linked by a theme based on time or place (ex: countryside, winter scenery), others are more focused on specific topics, like dinosaurs or medieval history. Other wimmelbooks include microplots, where double-page spreads are connected to each other.

Hieronymus Bosch and Pieter Bruegel the Elder are regarded as the fathers of the format. Contemporary wimmelbook authors include Hans Jürgen Press, Richard Scarry, Jean-Jacques Loup, Ali Mitgutsch, Mitsumasa Anno, Rotraut Susanne Berner, and Eva Scherbarth. In the United Kingdom and the United States, wimmelbooks gained popularity with the success of the Where's Wally? series by the British illustrator Martin Handford.

A series of board games named MicroMacro uses the Wimmelbild concept as the game board where players solve various missions. This provides a way to enjoy the concept in a group social activity.

== Ali Mitgutsch ==
Illustrator Ali Mitgutsch published Rundherum in meiner Stadt (All Around My City), a picture book including animals and people sprawled over double spreads. Mitgutsch drew easily recognizable crowded places, like markets and playgrounds, using color, form, figures, and routes to add direction and movement. He utilized a half birds-eye view and half frontal view, which depicted almost every object as the same size.

== See also ==
- Hidden object game
- Horror vacui - Latin phrase which means "fear of empty space"
