= Blackwell School National Historic Site =

- Blackwell School
- U.S. National Register of Historic Places
- U.S. National Historic Site
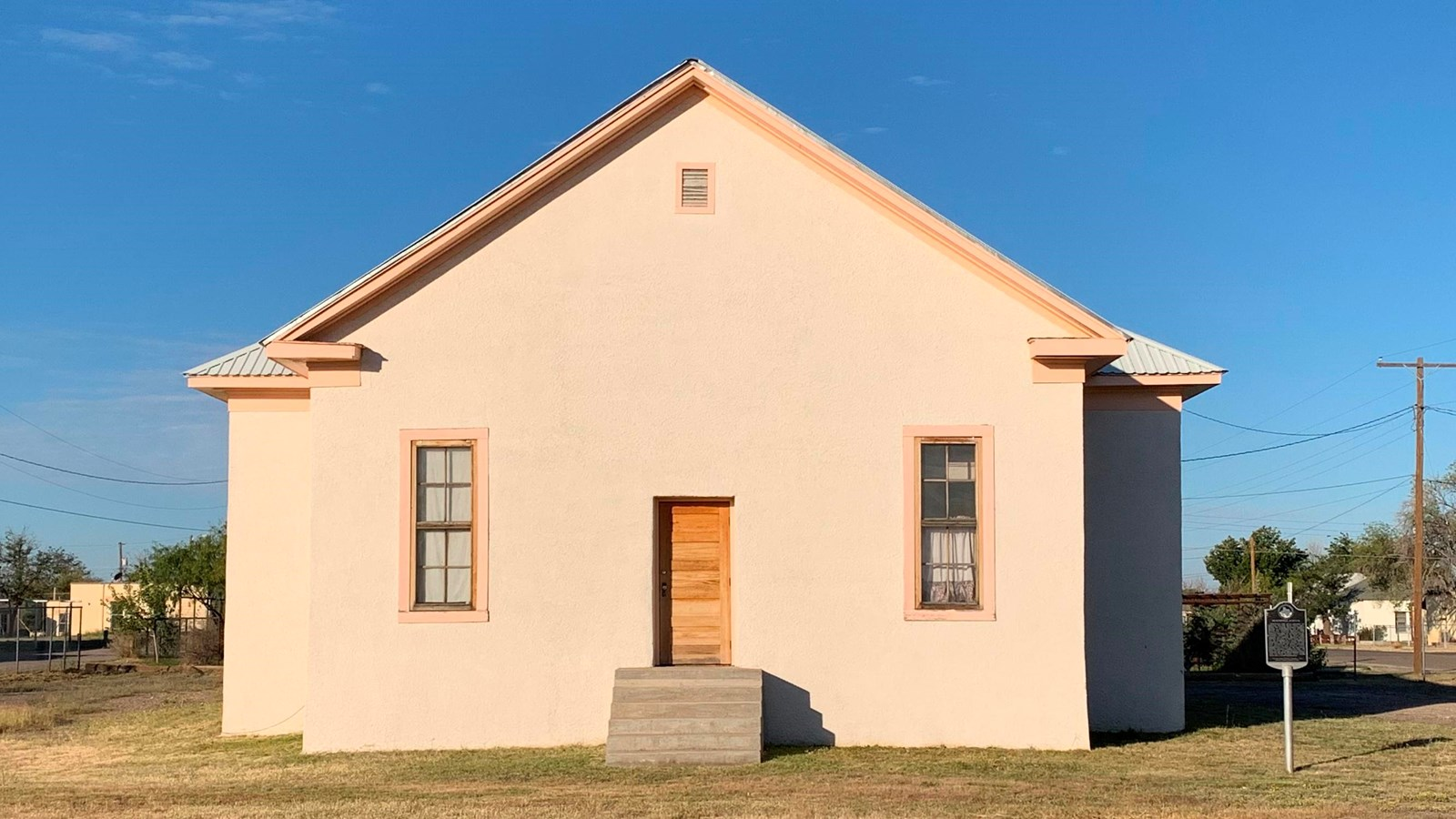

- Location within Texas Location within the United States
- Location: 501 South Abbot St. Marfa, Texas
- Coordinates: 30.3059°N 104.0221°W
- Built: 1909
- Architectural style: Late Victorian
- Website: Blackwell School National Historic Site
- NRHP reference No.: 100004751

Significant dates
- Added to NRHP: December 4, 2019
- Designated NHS: October 17, 2022

The Blackwell School was a segregrated school in Marfa, Texas, that served the city's Hispanic population from its construction in 1909 until the end of school segregation in 1965. On October 17, 2022, President Joe Biden signed legislation authorizing Blackwell School National Historic Site as a unit of the National Park Service (NPS); it was established on July 17, 2024, after the NPS acquired the property from the Marfa Independent School District. The site memorializes the history of supposedly "separate but equal" practices in Texas and elsewhere, as well as the role of education in Mexican-American culture and the Marfa community.

The main schoolhouse building is made of adobe and has three rooms. The site also includes the Band Hall, built in 1927 as an additional classroom; other buildings have since been torn down. Originally called the Ward or Mexican School, in 1940 it was named after the principal Jesse Blackwell. At that time, the school had grown to more than 600 students. After 1954, students were not permitted to speak Spanish; one former student recounted holding a mock funeral for the language. Although segregation was not required by state law, many Texas school districts practiced it until more than a decade after the Brown v. Board of Education decision.

Alumni formed the Blackwell School Alliance to preserve the school in 2006 when the Marfa ISD proposed demolishing it. Their efforts led to the school's listing on the National Register of Historic Places in 2019. The Alliance was to continue to maintain the school until the NPS acquired sufficient land from the district. The national historic site is the second area in the NPS specifically about Hispanic-American history, after César E. Chávez National Monument.

== See also ==
- National Register of Historic Places listings in Presidio County, Texas
- Hispanic Heritage Site
- Brown v. Board of Education National Historical Park
