= Building 98 =

Historic US Army building in Texas, US

- Building 98, Fort D.A. Russell
- U.S. National Register of Historic Places
- U.S. Historic district – Contributing property
- Recorded Texas Historic Landmark
- Building 98

- Location within Texas Location within the United States
- Location: W. Bonnie St., Marfa, Texas
- Coordinates: 30°18′11″N 104°1′39″W
- Area: 2.3 acres (0.93 ha)
- Built: 1895
- Part of: Fort D.A. Russell Historic District (ID06001152)
- NRHP reference No.: 04000100
- RTHL No.: 13284

Significant dates
- Added to NRHP: February 25, 2004
- Designated CP: December 14, 2006
- Designated RTHL: 2004

Building 98 at Fort D. A. Russell is the historic US army base bachelor officer quarters, officers club, and grand ballroom near Marfa, Texas; it was active from 1911 to 1946. Building 98 is Located at Fort David A. Russell's central fort complex. It is a project of the International Woman's Foundation and it is the home of the World War II German prisoners of war POW murals.

== Murals ==
The murals were painted in the state dining room and in the base library. They encompass over 3,048 square feet of wall space, making them a unique historic national treasure. The murals were completed in 1945 by Hans Jürgen Press and Robert Humpel, both German prisoners of war held at the base. The artist and writer Hans Jürgen Press was a sailplane (glider) pilot based in France during the war, and departed Building 98 in 1945. While there he created two west Texas watercolors of local residents—one performing a Spanish dance and another playing a Spanish guitar. Building 98 stands as a testimony to Marfa's long standing history in the arts. West Texas regionalism has a history in Texas dating back to the cattle drive, of which Marfa had many.

== History ==
In 1911 the United States Cavalry occupied the building where it served as the Bachelor Officer Quarters (BOQ) and as an entertainment center for West Point officers during World War I and the Mexican Revolution. The fort was established to protect local ranches and town citizens during dangerous times along the Texas and Mexico border. Building 98 also faced the main fort parade grounds and was the location of the original Camp Albert's command headquarters. Also housed at Building 98 was the fort officer's mess which had a full-time chef and large dining room. Building 98 also features a World War II ASM-N-2 BAT Glide Bomb cart from the original air base.

In 1949, the historic base was sold to J. Alfred Roosevelt, a grandson of Emlen Roosevelt. The International Woman's Foundation was responsible for placing Fort D. A. Russell on the National Register of Historic Places and for listing the base at the Texas Historical Commission, a long time dream of Roosevelt who had lived at the complex.

The International Woman's Foundation has operated an artist in residency program and Camp Marfa fort museum since 2002. In 2002 Mona Blocker Garcia took on the task of creating the foundation for mature woman artists and healthful aging thus preserving the important history of Fort D. A. Russell to its exact state when the fort closed. The George Sugarman courtyard is a permanent installation highlighted at the Building 98 metal sculpture garden

== Renovations ==
The International Woman's Foundation has been authentically restoring the building to its original integrity and is responsible for Fort D. A. Russell being placed on the National Register of Historic Places and the Texas state historical society register of historic places. Major renovations began in 2002 with the complete replacement of the structures roof and outside integrity of the walls. Emphasis on floors, furnishings and ceilings are maintained with original features negating intrusive damages caused from modernization after 1949. The building also had serious damage that occurred after the Great Depression. Today the restored Building 98 museum is open to the public and a guided tour is available. Building 98 is one of Marfa's most important historic places with a rich history that has been brought back to life within its unique complex. Preserving the history of the original army camp for future generations allows Building 98 stand as an important resource to understand and appreciate the significant roles Texas has played during times past.

== Art galleries ==
Building 98 requires an artist in residence to exhibit their works and the foundation provides the Studio 98 galleries as a venue and hosts a reception in the historic officers club. Events are yearly and are published through media agencies by advertisement. Important exhibitions include a major retrospective of the works of Wilhelmina Weber Furlong in the grand ballroom featuring over 75 unseen works of the early American modernist. An exhibit of the private belongings of the artist was displayed including her Victorian easel. The event served as the ten year anniversary gala for the foundation in October 2012

== See also ==
- German prisoners of war in the United States
- List of World War II prisoner-of-war camps in the United States
- National Register of Historic Places listings in Presidio County, Texas
