= Chemical mortar battalion =

WW2 US artillery units

Plaque on the cemetery wall remembering the 81st Chemical Mortar Battalion that landed on 6th June 1944 on Omaha beach for tehir actions during the liberation of Europe 1944-1945

Chemical mortar battalions were United States Army non-divisional units that were attached to infantry divisions during World War II. They were armed with 4.2-inch (107 mm) chemical mortars. For this reason, they were also called the "Four-deucers".

In 1943, General Mark W. Clark's Fifth Army established a policy that no infantry division would be committed to combat without a chemical mortar battalion attached. As a result, when infantry units were rotated out of combat, the mortar battalions often stayed in the line and were attached to fresh units. Chemical mortars were in such high demand that often the companies of a battalion would be split up and assigned to different divisions. On the first day that General George S. Patton's Third Army became operational, in the summer of 1944, he issued a standing order to his staff that no infantry division would be committed to combat without a chemical mortar battalion attached, and no infantry regiment would be committed without a mortar company attached.

== Development and capabilities of the chemical mortar ==
Mortars came to be acknowledged by U.S. Army commanders and personnel as being one of the most effective means of quickly striking at stationary targets, such as machine gun nests, prepared strongpoints, pillboxes and even artillery positions. Other advantages mortars offered compared to full-sized artillery pieces were their easier transportation, assembly, and disassembly. Thanks to their relatively small size, mortars were able to fire from concealed positions, such as natural escarpments on hillsides, or from woods.

The 4.2 in (107 mm) chemical mortar was developed from the British World War I-era 4 inch (101.6 mm) Stokes mortar. The Stokes mortar could fire twenty shells per minute and had a range of 1,100 yards (1,000 m) and in this way was capable of overwhelming enemy trenches. The American-built M1 4.2 inch (107 mm) mortar, first introduced in 1924, had a rifled barrel and a range of 2,300 yards (2,100 m). By the 1930s, after modifying the bore, improving the two-legged support and the recoil mechanism, and producing barrels made of seamless nickel steel, the M1A1 model was capable of sending shells 2,400 yards (2,200 m)

Chemical mortars were so named because of their original intent of firing poison gas, incendiary and smoke marker shells. Chemical shells were on standby during World War II, to be used in retaliation should the enemy employ chemical weapons first. By 1942, after authorization had been sought and granted to use high explosive shells, the new M2 model was produced with a stronger barrel. Its rate of fire was 40 rounds in the first two minutes, 100 rounds in the first 20 minutes and thereafter a sustained rate of 80 rounds per hour. These variations were caused by the stresses and strains on the barrels and the rest of firing mechanisms that were being imposed by different firing conditions.

Later, the mortar was developed to be capable of firing shells from a mere 565 yards (517 m) at minimum propellant charge, to a range of 7,450 yards (6,810 m). The propellant charges were manufactured as square disks with a hole in the middle, strung together, fitted into stacks, and sewn together into bundles of various thicknesses, often referred to as cheese charges due to their appearance. The rifled barrel gave the mortar remarkable accuracy; fire was often called on targets within fifty yards of friendly positions. The low-velocity shells were totally silent in transit and gave no warning of their powerful explosions (the M2 mortar's M3 high explosive shell contained 3.64 kilograms (8.0 lb) of explosives, placing it midway between the 2.18 kilograms (4.8 lb) of the 105 mm howitzer M2A1's M1 shell and the 6.88 kilograms (15.2 lb) of the 155 mm howitzer M1's M102 shell), which tended to create panic among enemy forces who were unexpectedly subjected to their firepower. The mortar was called the "grass-cutter" by German troops because its high explosive shell exploded and fragmented just a few inches above ground level. The mortars often fired white phosphorus munitions (WP) shells to block enemy observation with smoke; white phosphorus also caused casualties and fires, being especially effective against dug-in troops because the burning particles arced upward and fell directly down into foxholes.

== Battalion history and activation ==
Chemical mortar battalions had their origins in gas regiments, which were first organized in the interwar period. They were redesignated chemical regiments in 1929. The 1st and 2nd Gas Regiments were allotted to the Regular Army. The 1st Gas Regiment had seen service in World War I. It was inactivated on 15 April 1935 and concurrently reorganized entirely with Organized Reserve personnel as a Regular Army Inactive unit. It was inactivated on 9 October 1940 at Philadelphia, Pennsylvania, by transfer of personnel to the 902nd Chemical Regiment. The 2nd Chemical Regiment was constituted in the Regular Army 1 April 1931, assigned to the Zone of the Interior, and allotted to the Fourth Corps Area. Company C, the only active unit, was organized 1 April 1931 at Fort Benning, Georgia, from Company D, 1st Chemical Regiment. The remainder of the regiment was organized in June 1932 with Organized Reserve personnel as a Regular Army Inactive unit at Columbus, Georgia. It was inactivated on 25 August 1940 at Columbus by relief of personnel.

There were two separate Regular Army chemical battalions, one animal-drawn and one motorized. The animal-drawn 1st Chemical Battalion was located in Hawaii due to the mountainous terrain there. Company A, the only active unit, was organized 4 March 1931 at Schofield Barracks from the 2nd Separate Chemical Company. It was disbanded on 12 March 1942. The 2nd Chemical Battalion was organized on 16 April 1935, less Companies B and C, at Edgewood Arsenal, Maryland, and performed duties as the support unit for the Chemical Warfare School. Companies B and C were allotted to the Third Corps Area as inactive units and organized with Organized Reserve personnel.

Four chemical regiments (the 101st-104th) were allotted to the National Guard in 1931, but these were never organized and were withdrawn from the National Guard in 1934 and allotted to the Organized Reserve as the 307th-310th Chemical Regiments. The headquarters of the 307th, 308th, and 310th Chemical Regiments were initiated in 1937, but the 309th Chemical Regiment was never initiated. All the regiments were disbanded on 18 October 1943. The 301st and 302nd Gas Regiments were constituted and initiated in the Organized Reserve in 1923, while the 303rd-306th Chemical Regiments were initiated in 1931. All the regiments were disbanded on 18 October 1943. The 902nd and 904th Chemical Regiments were constituted in the Organized Reserve in 1940 and intended to be used as support units for the Chemical Warfare School, but they were both inactivated by relief of personnel on 7 August 1941.

=== Wartime ===
Upon U.S. entry into World War II, the 1st and 2nd Chemical Regiments had only one company between them on active duty, the two separate chemical battalions also each had one active company, and there were also two separate chemical companies, one of which would be lost on Bataan and the other inactivated. The headquarters of the 1st and 2nd Chemical Regiments and 1st Separate Chemical Battalion were disbanded on 12 March 1942. Four more chemical mortar battalions (the 81st-84th) were activated by mid-1942, but the number of battalions remained at six until May 1943. After the 2nd, 3rd, 83rd, and 84th Battalions were sent overseas to participate in the Allied invasion of Sicily, the War Department authorized the activation of four more battalions in May and June 1943 (the 85th-88th).

The 2nd, 3rd, and 83rd Chemical Mortar Battalions were withdrawn from Italy in July 1944 and assigned to the U.S. Seventh Army to participate in the invasion of southern France, leaving only the 84th Battalion to support the U.S. Fifth Army. In June 1944, the Fifth Army converted two antiaircraft artillery battalions into the 99th and 100th Chemical Mortar Battalions, but they were not ready for combat until October 1944.

In late 1943, in the European Theater, Colonel Hugh V. Rowan, the theater chemical officer, had recommended 24 chemical mortar battalions (two battalions per corps and two per army) be assigned to the theater. However, the troop ceiling and troop basis forwarded from the War Department for the European Theater provided for only seven battalions. General Omar Bradley, the theater commander, tried unsuccessfully to get a battalion from Italy. Colonel Rowan realized that if the battalions in the United States reorganized under the September 1943 table of organization, which reduced battalion strength from 1,010 to 622 officers and men, that would produce enough surplus personnel for eleven battalions (taking into account the battalions already existing and those to be created) and the theater would only need to requisition one more battalion above the War Department troop list. The 92nd Chemical Mortar Battalion was activated in England using a number of men which had been freed by the reorganization of the 81st Chemical Mortar Battalion.

In February 1944, a disappointed Rowan learned that the battalions in the United States had already been reorganized under the September 1943 table of organization. Rowan had successfully convinced the War Department to give him twelve battalions in the troop basis, but only seven would be available in 1944, including the two battalions in England (the 81st and 92nd) and two more (the 86th and 87th) that would arrive around projected date of D-Day.

Until the American drive into western Germany, chemical mortars were in short supply in the Twelfth United States Army Group; in September 1944, there were only four battalions (the 81st, 86th, 87th, and 92nd) assigned, and the battalions suffered from shortages of qualified officer and enlisted replacements. In December 1944, the 91st Chemical Mortar Battalion arrived in Europe and a "steady influx" of new battalions began; the 89th, 90th, 93rd, 94th, 95th, 96th, and 97th, leaving the Twelfth Army Group with a total of twelve battalions by the end of the war. The Sixth Army Group had four battalions (the 2nd, 3rd, 83rd, and 99th).

25 battalions served overseas, five of which (the 92nd and 97th-100th) were formed overseas.

Battalion	Activated	Inactivated	Campaigns	Notes
2nd Chemical Mortar Battalion	16 April 1935, Edgewood Arsenal, Maryland	26 July 1946, Germany	Sicily, Naples-Foggia, Rome-Arno, Southern France, Ardennes-Alsace, Central Europe (World War II); UN Offensive, CCF Intervention, First UN Counteroffensive, CCF Spring Offensive, UN Summer-Fall Offensive, Second Korean Winter, Korea Summer-Fall 1952, Third Korean Winter, Korea Summer 1953 (Korean War)	
3rd Chemical Mortar Battalion	1 January 1942, Fort Benning, Georgia	2 January 1946, Camp Patrick Henry, Virginia	Sicily, Naples-Foggia, Rome-Arno, Southern France, Rhineland, Ardennes-Alsace, Central Europe	
71st Chemical Mortar Battalion	7 December 1944, Camp Shelby, Mississippi	18 January 1946, Vancouver Barracks, Washington	Ryukyus	Converted from 479th Antiaircraft Artillery Battalion
72nd Chemical Mortar Battalion	7 December 1944, Camp Shelby, Mississippi	18 April 1946, Hawaii	Deployed overseas but not credited with any campaigns	Converted from 560th Antiaircraft Artillery Battalion
80th Chemical Mortar Battalion	30 June 1944, Camp Swift, Texas	1 February 1946, Camp Stoneman, California	Leyte, Southern Philippines	
81st Chemical Mortar Battalion	25 April 1942, Fort D.A. Russell, Wyoming	7 November 1945, Fort Leonard Wood, Missouri	Normandy, Northern France, Rhineland, Ardennes-Alsace, Central Europe	
82nd Chemical Mortar Battalion	25 April 1942, Fort Bliss, Texas	20 May 1947, Japan	Northern Solomons, Bismarck Archipelago, Luzon	
83rd Chemical Mortar Battalion	10 June 1942, Camp Gordon, Georgia	26 November 1945, Camp Myles Standish, Massachusetts	Sicily, Naples-Foggia, Anzio, Rome-Arno, Southern France, Rhineland, Ardennes-Alsace, Central Europe	
84th Chemical Mortar Battalion	5 June 1942, Camp Rucker, Alabama	25 September 1945, Italy	Anzio, Naples-Foggia, Rome-Arno, North Apennines, Po Valley	
85th Chemical Mortar Battalion	5 June 1943, Fort D.A. Russell, Wyoming	31 May 1946, Philippines	Bismarck Archipelago, New Guinea, Leyte, Luzon	
86th Chemical Mortar Battalion	17 May 1943, Camp Swift, Texas	1 November 1946, Camp Campbell, Kentucky	Normandy, Northern France, Rhineland, Ardennes-Alsace, Central Europe	
87th Chemical Mortar Battalion	22 May 1943, Camp Rucker, Alabama	6 November 1945, Fort Benning, Georgia	Normandy, Northern France, Rhineland, Ardennes-Alsace, Central Europe	
88th Chemical Mortar Battalion	29 May 1943, Camp Rucker, Alabama	29 December 1945, Camp Anza, California	Western Pacific, Leyte, Ryukyus	
89th Chemical Mortar Battalion	15 November 1943, Camp Roberts, California	29 October 1945, Fort Jackson, South Carolina	Central Europe, Rhineland	
90th Chemical Mortar Battalion	10 February 1944, Fort Bragg, North Carolina	20 February 1946, Fort Jackson, South Carolina	Central Europe, Rhineland	
91st Chemical Mortar Battalion	15 February 1944, Camp Robinson, Arkansas	1 February 1949, Maryland	Rhineland, Ardennes-Alsace, Central Europe	
92nd Chemical Mortar Battalion	9 February 1944, Brockley Combe, England	27 October 1945, Camp San Luis Obispo, California	Normandy, Northern France, Rhineland, Ardennes-Alsace, Central Europe	
93rd Chemical Mortar Battalion	24 March 1944, Camp Rucker, Alabama	20 October 1945, Fort Bragg, North Carolina	Central Europe	
94th Chemical Mortar Battalion	24 March 1944, Fort Jackson, South Carolina	5 November 1945, Camp Shelby, Mississippi	Rhineland, Central Europe	
95th Chemical Mortar Battalion	1 April 1944, Camp Polk, Louisiana	19 December 1945, Camp Shelby, Mississippi	Central Europe	
96th Chemical Mortar Battalion	1 April 1944, Camp Livingston, Louisiana	14 February 1946, Camp Kilmer, New Jersey	Central Europe	
97th Chemical Mortar Battalion	5 May 1944, Fort Leonard Wood, Missouri	23 November 1945, Camp Polk, Louisiana	Central Europe	
98th Chemical Mortar Battalion	24 June 1944, Buna, New Guinea	26 December 1945, Camp Anza, California	New Guinea, Luzon	Converted from 641st Tank Destroyer Battalion
99th Chemical Mortar Battalion	28 August 1944, Caserta, Italy	18 October 1945, Fort Chaffee, Arkansas	Rome-Arno, Rhineland, Central Europe	Converted from 442nd Antiaircraft Artillery Battalion
100th Chemical Mortar Battalion	30 August 1944, La Fagianeria, Italy	13 October 1945, Camp Myles Standish, Massachusetts	Rome-Arno, North Apennines, Po Valley	Converted from 637th Antiaircraft Artillery Battalion

Seven additional battalions formed late in the war via conversion from field artillery battalions were activated too late to serve overseas.

Battalion	Activated	Inactivated	Notes
443rd Chemical Mortar Battalion	1 July 1945, Camp Hood, Texas	22 September 1945, Camp Hood, Texas	Converted from 443rd Field Artillery Battalion (8 inch howitzer)
483rd Chemical Mortar Battalion	1 July 1945, Camp Hood, Texas	22 September 1945, Camp Hood, Texas	Converted from 483rd Field Artillery Battalion (8 inch howitzer)
534th Chemical Mortar Battalion	5 July 1945, Camp Gruber, Oklahoma	1 September 1945, Camp Gruber, Oklahoma	Converted from 534th Field Artillery Battalion (8 inch howitzer)
537th Chemical Mortar Battalion	5 July 1945, Camp Gruber, Oklahoma	8 September 1945, Camp Gruber, Oklahoma	Converted from 537th Field Artillery Battalion (8 inch howitzer)
560th Chemical Mortar Battalion	9 July 1945, Fort Bragg, North Carolina	22 September 1945, Fort Bragg, North Carolina	Converted from 560th Field Artillery Battalion (240 mm howitzer)
781st Chemical Mortar Battalion	5 July 1945, Camp Bowie, Texas	22 September 1945, Camp Bowie, Texas	Converted from 781st Field Artillery Battalion (8 inch howitzer)
782nd Chemical Mortar Battalion	5 July 1945, Camp Bowie, Texas	22 September 1945, Camp Bowie, Texas	Converted from 782nd Field Artillery Battalion (8 inch howitzer)

After World War II, the U.S. War Department transferred the operations and development of chemical mortars to the Ordnance Department, in this way making the mortar an official infantry weapon. The 2nd Chemical Mortar Battalion was the last of the chemical mortar battalions, and the only one to see combat after World War II. It was reactivated in 1949 and saw 1,008 days of combat during the Korean War. In January 1953, its combat personnel were transferred to the 461st Infantry Battalion (Heavy Mortar.)

== Battalion organization ==
Originally, chemical mortar battalions had 36 officers, one warrant officer, and 973 enlisted men, for a total of 1,010, distributed among a headquarters, headquarters company, medical detachment, and four mortar companies. Each mortar company had twelve mortars organized into two platoons, each with two sections, with each section having three squads of one mortar each. Sidearms for battalion members included 820 M1911 pistols. There were 88 2.5-ton trucks and 36 various smaller vehicles. In actual combat, the 2.5 ton truck assigned as a prime mover often proved too conspicuous, so mortar crews sometimes used jeeps or mules to transport the mortar parts.

In July 1944, the 84th Chemical Mortar Battalion in Italy reorganized under the "long ignored" table of organization of September 1943. Lieutenant Colonel Ronald LeV. Martin of the 92nd Chemical Mortar Battalion received permission to eliminate one company of his battalion, anticipating future developments. In mid-1944, the War Department again revised the table of organization based upon the recommendations of Chemical Warfare Service officers with combat experience. One mortar company was eliminated to better fit with the three infantry regiments of the "triangular" infantry division, and the mortar companies were reorganized to have three platoons of four mortars each instead of two platoons of six mortars each. The strength of the battalion rose from 622 to 672, mainly because of the redesignation of the headquarters detachment of 63 men as a headquarters company with 155 men. Per Table of Organization and Equipment 3-25 of 29 September 1944, a typical chemical mortar battalion had an establishment of 37 officers, 138 NCOs and 481 junior enlisted men not counting the attached medical detachment. It consisted of:

- 1 chemical mortar battalion headquarters company, containing:
  - 1 company headquarters section (4 officers, 4 noncommissioned officers, and 14 junior enlisted men)
  - 1 battalion headquarters section (5 officers, 6 noncommissioned officers, and 20 junior enlisted men
  - 1 maintenance section (1 officer, 2 noncommissioned officers, and 6 junior enlisted men)
  - 3 ammunition sections (each of 2 noncommissioned officers and 29 junior enlisted men)
- 3 chemical mortar companies
- Attached medical detachment (1 officer, 1 noncommissioned officer, and 13 junior enlisted men)

A chemical mortar company usually had an establishment of 9 officers, 40 noncommissioned officers and 118 junior enlisted men. It consisted of:

- 1 chemical mortar company headquarters section (three officers, seven noncommissioned officers, and 28 junior enlisted men)
- 3 mortar platoons

A mortar platoon consisted of:

- One platoon headquarters (two officers, three noncommissioned officers, and six junior enlisted men)
- Four mortar squads, each of which had one squad leader, (noncommissioned officer) one gunner, (noncommissioned officer) one assistant gunner, (junior enlisted man) three ammunition bearers, (junior enlisted men) and two truck drivers (junior enlisted men)

In November 1944, the 84th and 100th Chemical Mortar Battalions stationed in Italy reorganized under the September 1944 table of organization. Beginning in December 1944 and continuing into spring 1945, battalions in Europe reorganized under the new table of organization.
