= Ali Mitgutsch =

German illustrator (1935–2022)

- Born: Alfons Mitgutsch; 21 August 1935; Munich, Bavaria, Germany
- Died: 10 January 2022 (aged 86); Munich, Germany
- Occupations: Author, illustrator
- Writing career
- Genre: Wimmelbild picture books
- Notable work: Rundherum in meiner Stadt (1968)
- Notable awards: Deutscher Jugendliteraturpreis (1969); Hans Christian Andersen Award (1978); Verdienstkreuz am Bande (2018)

Alfons "Ali" Mitgutsch (German: [ˈaːli ˈmɪtˌɡʊt͡ʃ]; 21 August 1935 – 10 January 2022) was a German author of picture books and a professional advertising Illustrator. He was known as the father of the Wimmelbilder books.

== Life and career ==
Mitgutsch was born in Munich, Bavaria, Germany, on 21 August 1935. As a child, the Mitgutsch family was evacuated to Allgäu in World War II due to bombing in Munich. After returning to Munich, he trained at the Graphical Academy as a lithographer.

In the 1960s, Kurt Seelmann, a child psychologist, inspired him to create a special kind of picture book for children. Mitgutsch became famous for his Wimmelbilder-books. These books show everyday scenes in a single painting across the pages on top. Rundherum in meiner Stadt (Around in my city), released in 1968, is the first book in the series.

Mitgutsch lived in Munich, the city inspired his paintings. He died in Munich from complications of pneumonia on 10 January 2022, at the age of 86.

== Awards ==
- 1960 nominated for Deutscher Jugendliteraturpreis for Pepes Hut
- 1961 nominated for Deutscher Jugendliteraturpreis for Ulus abenteuerliche Reise zum Nordlicht
- 1962 nominated for Deutscher Jugendliteraturpreis for Nico findet einen Schatz
- 1969 Deutscher Jugendbuchpreis for the picture book Rundherum in meiner Stadt
- 1971 nominated for Deutscher Jugendliteraturpreis for Bei uns im Dorf
- 1972 nominated for Deutscher Jugendliteraturpreis for Komm mit ans Wasser
- 1978 Hans Christian Andersen Award for Rund ums Schiff (Around the ship)
- 2003 Schwabing Art Award
- 2016 Ernst-Hoferichter-Preis
- 2018 Verdienstkreuz am Bande der Bundesrepublik Deutschland for a new Genre
- 2019 Oberbayerischer Kulturpreis

== Publications ==
- Mitgutsch, Ali; Gregorzewski, Ingmar (May 2015). Herzanzünder: Mein Leben als Kind. dtv Verlagsgesellschaft. ISBN 978-3-423-28057-0.

=== Picture books ===
- Pepes Hut (1959)
- Ulus abenteuerliche Reise (1960 im Münchener Bilderbuch Verlag)
- Nico findet einen Schatz (1961)
- Rundherum in meiner Stadt (1968 Deutscher Jugendliteraturpreis)
- Bei uns im Dorf (1970) (In our Village)
- Komm mit ans Wasser (1971)
- Auf dem Lande
- Rund ums Rad (1975)
- Rund ums Schiff (1977)
- Hier in den Bergen (1979)
- Was wimmelt denn da (What's teeming here)
- Die Hexe und die sieben Fexe
- Unsere große Stadt (1988)
- Ritterbuch (Knightsbook)
- Engel in der Werkstatt
- Aufbruch der Weihnachtsmänner
- Mein schönstes Wimmelbilderbuch
- Das große Piraten-Wimmelbuch
- Alle spielen mit
- Mein riesengroßes Piraten-Wimmelbuch
- Mein riesengroßes Wimmel-Suchbuch (2010)
- Fizzel baut eine Burg (Fizzel is building a castle), Otto Maier, Ravensburg,1992, Reihe Kleine Ravensburger
- Vom Korn zum Brot (From grain to bread)
