= John B. Poindexter =

American businessman and soldier

Personal details
- Born: John B. Poindexter; 1944 (age 81–82) Houston, Texas, U.S.
- Education: UARK, BS (Hons) (1966); NYU, MBA (1971); NYU, PhD (1976)

Military service
- Allegiance: United States of America
- Branch/service: United States Army
- Years of service: 1967–1971
- Rank: Captain
- Awards: Silver Star Medal; Soldier's Medal; Bronze Star Medal (2); Purple Heart Medal (2); Presidential Unit Citation; Vietnam Cross of Gallantry

John B. Poindexter (born 1944) is an American businessman and former soldier. He is the chairman of the board and chief executive officer of J.B. Poindexter & Co., Inc. (dba JB Poindexter & Co) and owner of Cibolo Creek Ranch.

== Early life and education ==
Poindexter was born in Houston, Texas.

He graduated from the University of Arkansas in 1966 with a Bachelor of Science in Business Administration with Honors. After several years' military service, he entered New York University, where an MBA in 1971 was followed by a Ph.D. in Economics and Finance in 1976.

== Military service and aftermath ==
Poindexter joined OCS in 1967 and graduated that July. After three years with L Troop of the 3rd Squadron, 3rd Armored Cavalry Regiment (as Platoon Leader and Executive Officer in Germany, and then Troop Commander in Fort Lewis, WA), he joined the 11th Armored Cavalry Regiment in Vietnam in 1970. Initially serving as Commander of Headquarters Troop, he was then appointed as Commander of 1st Squadron's A Troop.

On March 26, 1970, the hundred-strong Charlie Company of the 2nd Battalion, 8th Cavalry Regiment, unwittingly entered into an area of dense jungle containing a complex of North Vietnamese bunkers and were pinned down by approximately 400 NVA troops.

Captains Poindexter and Ray Armer (of the 2nd Battalion's airborne infantry Alpha Company) heard their call for assistance, and in the absence of orders from Command, Poindexter directed Alpha Troop to aid Charlie Company. In the resulting battle, 20 U.S. troops were wounded, including Poindexter, and there were at least two fatalities. At dusk, with concern that the night would advantage the North Vietnamese, Poindexter ordered a full retreat.

During the next few months before he returned to the United States, Poindexter applied for dozens of decorations to be awarded to members of his troop, and wrote an unpublished account of the battle.

In 1999 he used this account to develop a presentation on small unit leadership for an 11th Cavalry professional development program, and subsequently revised it for publication in Armor in 2000.

As a nation, we have an obligation to this troop. Their actions that day went largely unnoticed -- for decades -- until their old captain, John Poindexter, realized that their service had been overlooked... And so he spent years tracking down his troopers and gathering their stories, filing reports, fighting for the Silver Stars and Bronze Stars they deserved and bringing us to this day.

Thank you, John.

— President Barack Obama, Oct 20, 2009.

In 2002, he discovered through reading Keith W. Nolan's Into Cambodia that the decorations he had applied for on behalf of members of Alpha Troop had never been awarded. He resubmitted applications for award in 2003, but only 14 additional individual awards were made. To remedy this, he coordinated a team of a hundred volunteers to help obtain and compile evidence from both documentary and eyewitness sources, and self-published The Anonymous Battle (2004), an account based on his manuscript and the collected evidence.

Because the time elapsed was significant, and consequently not all individual medal claims could be sufficiently substantiated, Poindexter sought award of a Presidential Unit Citation to provide recognition to all members of Alpha Troop.

During his campaign for recognition, he obtained support from generals including Brigadier General John Bahnsen, the retired commander of the 11th Cavalry's 1st Squadron, as well as from Texas Senator John Cornyn, who submitted the dossier in 2004 to the then-Secretary of the Army. In late 2008, award of a Presidential Unit Citation was approved; this was unveiled in California (11th Cavalry being stationed at Fort Irwin) in September, 2009. On October 20, 2009, President Barack Obama presented attending Alpha Troop veterans with the Presidential Unit Citation at the White House.

Philip Keith's 2012 Blackhorse Riders: A Desperate Last Stand, an Extraordinary Rescue Mission, and the Vietnam Battle America Forgot details the action and Poindexter's campaign for its recognition.

=== Awards and decorations ===
For his military service, Poindexter was awarded the Silver Star, the Soldier's Medal, two Bronze Stars, two Purple Hearts, the Air Medal, the Army Commendation Medal, and the Vietnam Cross of Gallantry with Silver Star.

== Career ==
=== Business ===
Poindexter joined Salomon Brothers as an investment banker in New York City in 1971 while completing his doctorate, and until 1985 worked in Venture Capital including a vice presidency at Smith Barney. In 1985, he founded J.B. Poindexter & Co., Inc., one of the world's largest manufacturer of commercial truck bodies. JB Poindexter & Co is a business enterprise that provides commercial automotive and manufacturing goods and services. The business units include Morgan Truck Group, Morgan Olson, Reading Truck, EFP Corporation, Pulse (formerly DBCM) and Masterack. Former companies include Truck Accessories Group (dba LEER), FederalEagle, MIC Group, and EAVX.

=== Ranching and Land Conservation ===
Poindexter acquired Cibolo Creek Ranch in 1990, and operates it as a luxury historical resort. Poindexter started the Tidewater and Big Bend Foundation, dedicated to acquiring, restoring, landscaping and furnishing ante bellum houses and properties in New Kent County, VA, Charles City County, VA and Shafter, TX.

Poindexter holds a leadership position in the International Order of St. Hubertus, a hunting society. Antonin Scalia died at Poindexter's Cibolo Creek Ranch in February 2016.
