= Fort D. A. Russell (Texas) =

- Fort D.A. Russell Historic District
- U.S. National Register of Historic Places
- U.S. Historic district
- Location within Texas Location within the United States
- Location: Roughly bounded by Ridge, El Paso, Kelly Sts, US 67 and RM 2810
- Nearest city: Marfa, Texas
- Coordinates: 30°17′46″N 104°1′47″W
- Area: 426.9 acres (172.8 ha)
- NRHP reference No.: 06001152
- Added to NRHP: December 14, 2006

Fort D. A. Russell is the name of an American military installation near Marfa, Texas, that was active from 1911 to 1946. It is named for David Allen Russell, a Civil War general killed at the Battle of Opequon, September 19, 1864.

It was established in 1911 as Camp Albert, a base for cavalry and air reconnaissance units sent to protect West Texas from Mexican bandits after the Pancho Villa raid.

The base was expanded and renamed Camp Marfa during World War I. In the interwar years, the base became the headquarters for the Marfa Command, which replaced the Big Bend District. In 1924, a patrol called the Mounted Watchmen was established to deter persons from crossing the Rio Grande into the United States.

In 1930, the base was renamed Fort D. A. Russell. The name had been used on a previous military base in Wyoming; the name became available when that post was renamed Fort Francis E. Warren.

The base was briefly abandoned during the Great Depression. On January 2, 1933, the Army closed the post, but reactivated it in 1935 as the home base of the 77th Field Artillery.

During World War II, the post was expanded and used as an air base, a base for a Women's Army Corps unit, a training facility for chemical mortar battalions, and a base for troops guarding the U.S.-Mexican border. The Marfa Army Airfield was constructed nearby and was used as pilot-training facility.

German prisoners of war were also housed in a POW camp on the base.

In 1945, shortly after the end of World War II, the fort was closed during America's demobilization. On October 23, 1946, the base was transferred to the Corps of Engineers. The Texas National Guard assumed control of the base shortly afterward. In 1949, most of the base's land was divided up and sold to local citizens.

In the late 1970s, under the auspices of the Dia Art Foundation, artist Donald Judd acquired the former fort and began converting the buildings to house permanent large-scale art installations. Originally conceived to include works by Judd, John Chamberlain, and Dan Flavin, the museum was later expanded to include works by Carl Andre, Ingolfur Arnarrson, Ilya Kabakov, Roni Horn, Claes Oldenburg and Coosje van Bruggen, David Rabinowitch, and John Wesley. Judd's museum opened to the public in 1986 as the Chinati Foundation.

Building 98, Marfa, Texas, 2012

Located at Fort David A. Russell's central complex is Building 98, a project of the International Woman's Foundation and the home of the iconic World War II German POW murals. The murals were completed in 1945 by Hans Jürgen Press and Robert Humpel, both German prisoners of war held at the base. The building served as the bachelor officer quarters and as an entertainment center for West Point officers during World War I and the Mexican Revolution. The International Woman's Foundation was responsible for placing Fort D. A. Russell on the National Register of Historic Places' the foundation has operated an artist-in-residency program and base museum since 2002. In 2002, Mona Blocker Garcia took on the task of creating the foundation for mature women artists and healthful aging, thus preserving the important history of Fort D. A. Russell to near its exact state when the fort closed.

== See also ==
- List of World War II prisoner-of-war camps in the United States
- German prisoners of war in the United States
- National Register of Historic Places listings in Presidio County, Texas
- Fort D. A. Russell (Wyoming)
