= Marfa, Texas =

- City
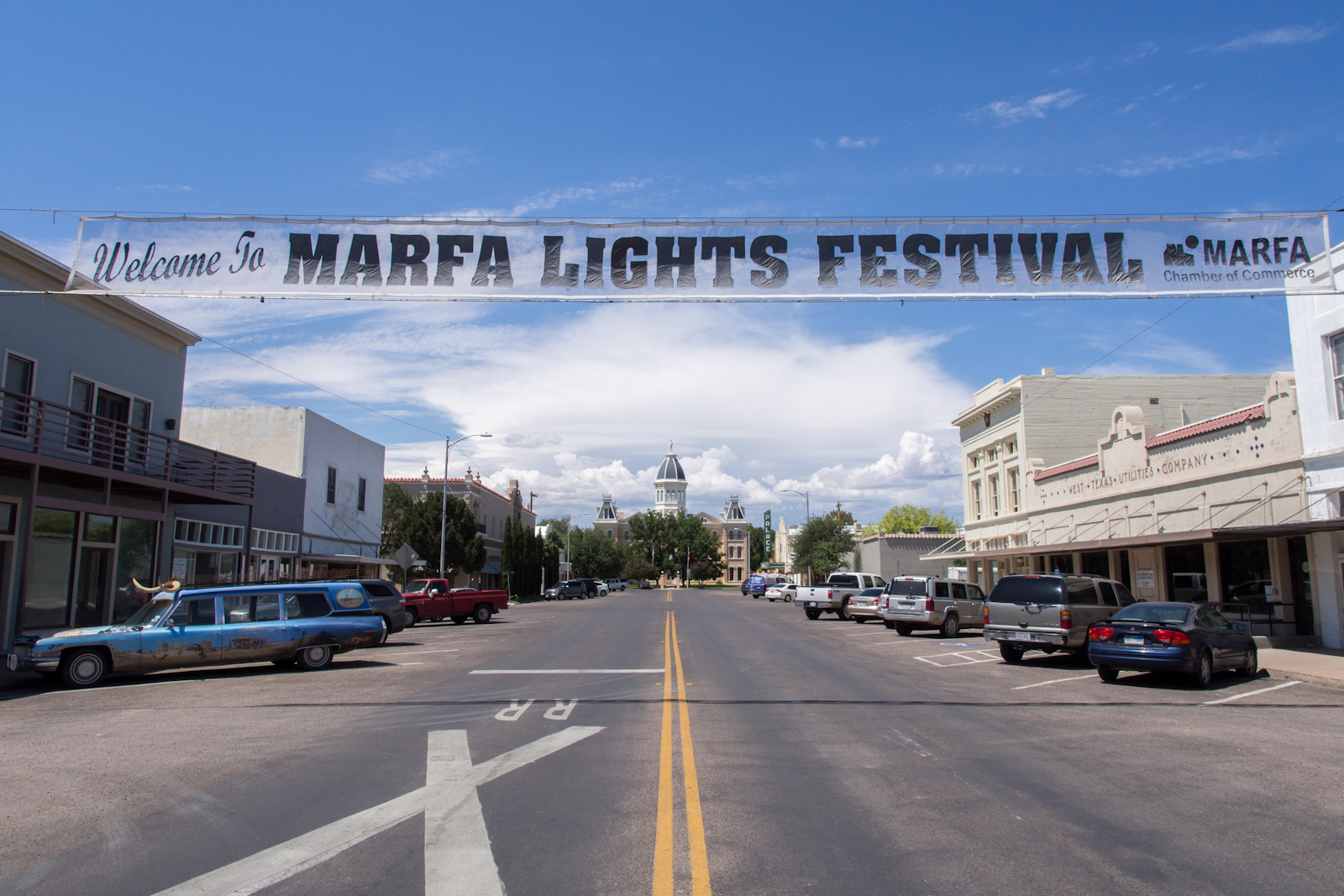
- Downtown Marfa

- Seal

- Location of Marfa in Presidio County

- Location in Texas Location in the United States of America
- Coordinates: 30°18′38″N 104°01′32″W
- Country: United States
- State: Texas
- County: Presidio
- Named for: Marfa Strogoff, a character in the novel Michael Strogoff

Government
  - Mayor: Manuel V. Baeza

Area
  - Total: 1.63 sq mi (4.22 km^{2})
  - Land: 1.63 sq mi (4.22 km^{2})
  - Water: 0 sq mi (0.00 km^{2})
- Elevation: 4,698 ft (1,432 m)

Population (2020)
  - Total: 1,788
  - Density: 1,000/sq mi (385/km^{2})
- Demonym: Marfan
- Time zone: UTC-6 (Central (CST))
  - Summer (DST): UTC-5 (CDT)
- ZIP code: 79843
- Area code: 432
- FIPS code: 48-46620
- GNIS feature ID: 2411031
- Website: cityofmarfa.com

Marfa is a city in the high desert of the Trans-Pecos in far West Texas, United States. Founded in the early 1880s as a railroad water stop, it lies between the Davis Mountains and Big Bend National Park at an elevation of 4685 feet and is the county seat of Presidio County. The population of Marfa peaked in the 1930s and as of the 2020 United States Census, its population was 1,788.

Today, Marfa is a tourist destination and a major center for minimalist art. Major attractions include the Chinati Foundation, the Judd Foundation, Ballroom Marfa, Building 98, and the Marfa lights.

== History ==
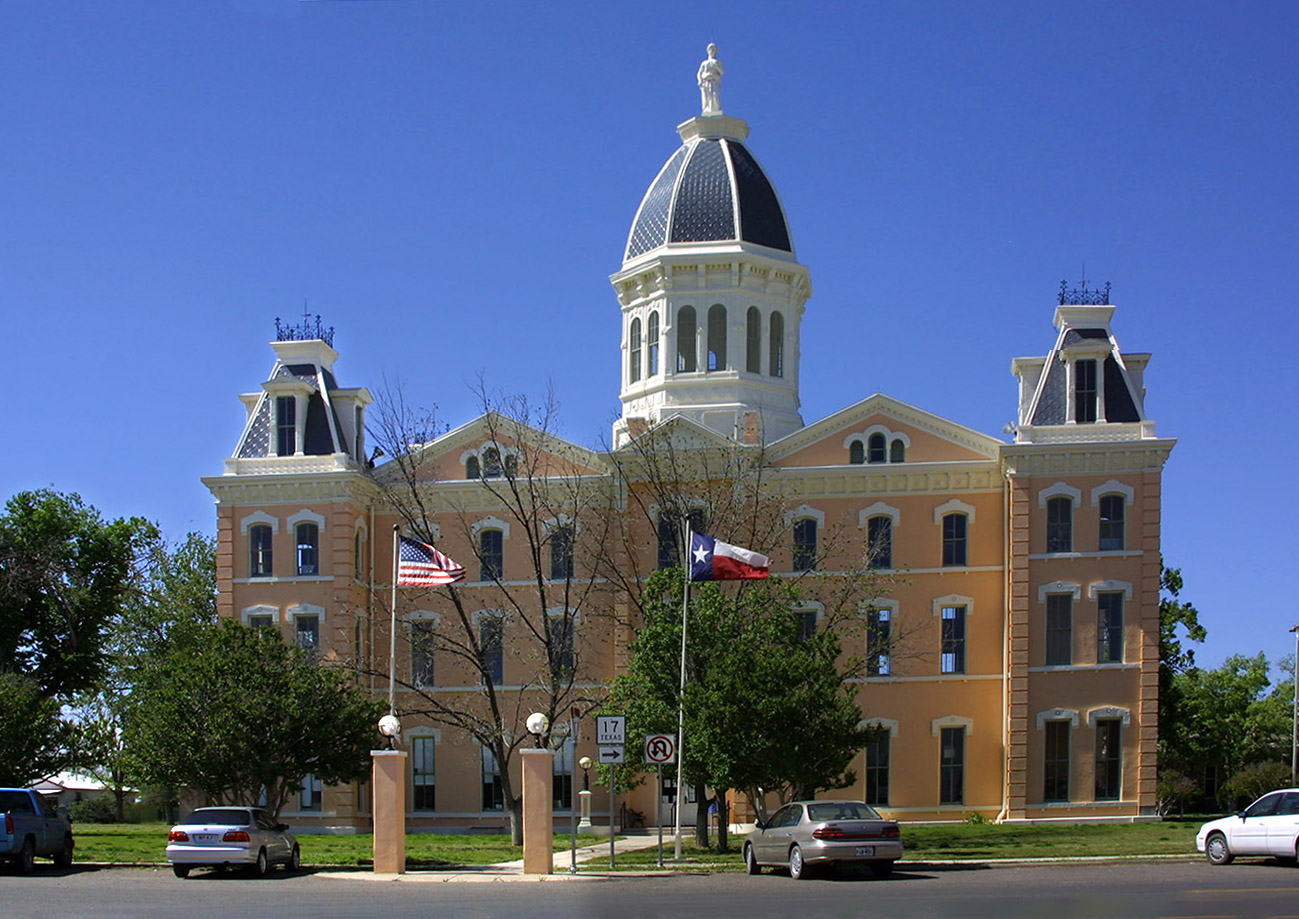
Presidio County Courthouse in Marfa

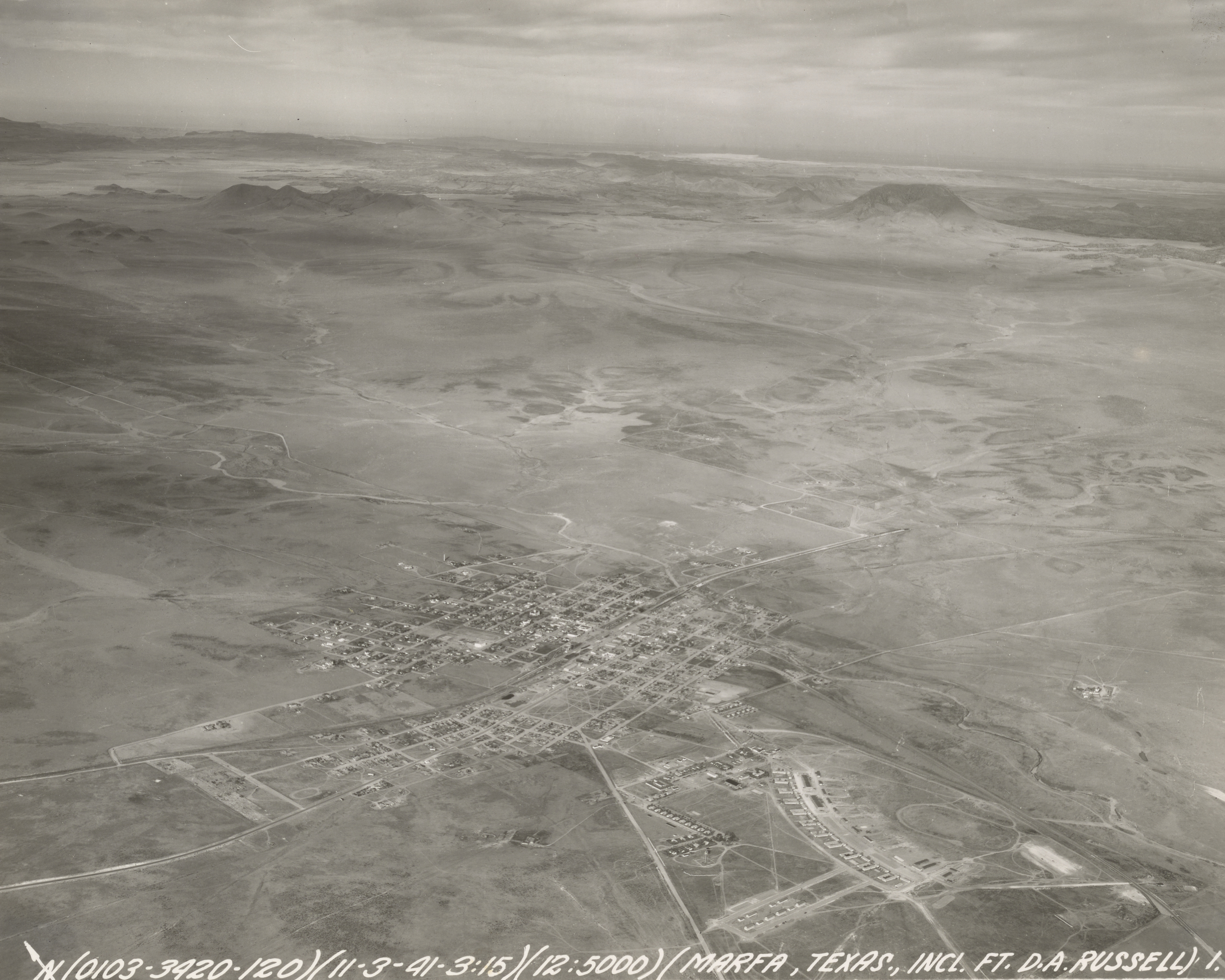
Marfa in 1941

Marfa was founded in the early 1880s as a railroad water stop. The town was named "Marfa" (Russian for "Martha") at the suggestion of the wife of a railroad executive. Although some historians have hypothesized that the name came from a character in Fyodor Dostoevsky's novel The Brothers Karamazov, Marfa was actually named after Marfa Strogoff, a character in Jules Verne's novel Michael Strogoff. According to Sterry Butcher of the Texas Monthly, a writer researched the Karamazov story and deemed it false, but did not receive any letters to the editor after he submitted the story to the newspaper, so "No one cared. The story we had suited Marfa just fine."

The city grew quickly during the 1920s.

The Marfa Army Air Field served as a training facility for several thousand pilots during World War II, including the American actor Robert Sterling, before closing in 1945. The base was also used as the training ground for many of the United States Army's chemical mortar battalions.

Marfa experienced economic issues after the war ended and after a drought impaired agricultural output. Artist Donald Judd arrived in 1973 and began buying properties to renovate, which resulted in bohemian interest in the community. In 2012, Vanity Fair described it as a "playground" for "art-world pioneers and pilgrims".

== Geography ==
Marfa is in northeastern Presidio County within the Chihuahuan Desert. The city is about 20 miles south of Fort Davis on Texas Route 17 and about 18 miles west of Alpine on US Route 67. Marfa is about 60 miles from the Mexico-U.S. border. According to the United States Census Bureau, the town has a total area of 1.6 sq mi (4.1 km^{2}), all land.

=== Climate ===
Marfa experiences a semiarid climate (Köppen climate classification BSk) with hot summers and cool winters. Due to its elevation and aridity, the diurnal temperature variation is substantial.

Climate data for Marfa #2, Texas. (Elevation 4,790ft)
Month	Jan	Feb	Mar	Apr	May	Jun	Jul	Aug	Sep	Oct	Nov	Dec	Year
Record high °F (°C)	81 (27)	86 (30)	90 (32)	96 (36)	102 (39)	106 (41)	103 (39)	104 (40)	100 (38)	95 (35)	86 (30)	79 (26)	106 (41)
Mean daily maximum °F (°C)	60.2 (15.7)	63.9 (17.7)	71.2 (21.8)	78.8 (26.0)	85.8 (29.9)	91.2 (32.9)	89.6 (32.0)	87.5 (30.8)	83.6 (28.7)	77.3 (25.2)	67.6 (19.8)	60.8 (16.0)	76.5 (24.7)
Daily mean °F (°C)	42.9 (6.1)	46.0 (7.8)	52.3 (11.3)	60.1 (15.6)	67.9 (19.9)	74.4 (23.6)	74.9 (23.8)	73.3 (22.9)	68.7 (20.4)	60.7 (15.9)	50.5 (10.3)	43.7 (6.5)	59.6 (15.3)
Mean daily minimum °F (°C)	25.7 (−3.5)	28.1 (−2.2)	33.5 (0.8)	41.4 (5.2)	50.1 (10.1)	57.6 (14.2)	60.2 (15.7)	59.1 (15.1)	54.0 (12.2)	44.1 (6.7)	33.4 (0.8)	26.6 (−3.0)	42.8 (6.0)
Record low °F (°C)	−2 (−19)	0 (−18)	6 (−14)	17 (−8)	27 (−3)	39 (4)	53 (12)	50 (10)	36 (2)	16 (−9)	−1 (−18)	2 (−17)	−2 (−19)
Average precipitation inches (mm)	0.42 (11)	0.47 (12)	0.31 (7.9)	0.59 (15)	1.17 (30)	1.78 (45)	2.73 (69)	2.89 (73)	2.57 (65)	1.39 (35)	0.58 (15)	0.50 (13)	15.41 (391)
Average snowfall inches (cm)	0.7 (1.8)	0.6 (1.5)	0.1 (0.25)	0.0 (0.0)	0.0 (0.0)	0.0 (0.0)	0.0 (0.0)	0.0 (0.0)	0.0 (0.0)	0.0 (0.0)	0.4 (1.0)	0.4 (1.0)	2.2 (5.6)
Average precipitation days (≥ 0.01 in)	3	3	2	3	5	7	9	10	8	5	3	3	59
Source: Western Regional Climate Center, Desert Research Institute

== Demographics ==
Historical population
Census	Pop.	Note	%±
1920	3,553		—
1930	3,909		10.0%
1940	3,805		−2.7%
1950	3,603		−5.3%
1960	2,799		−22.3%
1970	2,647		−5.4%
1980	2,466		−6.8%
1990	2,424		−1.7%
2000	2,121		−12.5%
2010	1,981		−6.6%
2020	1,788		−9.7%
U.S. Decennial Census; 1850–1900 1910; 1920 1930 1940; 1950 1960 1970; 1980 1990 2000; 2010 2020

Marfa first appeared as a city in the 1920 U.S. census.

=== Racial and ethnic composition ===
Marfa city, Texas – Racial and ethnic composition Note: the US Census treats Hispanic/Latino as an ethnic category. This table excludes Latinos from the racial categories and assigns them to a separate category. Hispanics/Latinos may be of any race.
Race / Ethnicity (NH = Non-Hispanic)	Pop 2000	Pop 2010	Pop 2020	% 2000	% 2010	% 2020
White alone (NH)	616	595	678	29.04%	30.04%	37.92%
Black or African American alone (NH)	5	8	13	0.24%	0.40%	0.73%
Native American or Alaska Native alone (NH)	8	3	4	0.38%	0.15%	0.22%
Asian alone (NH)	1	1	12	0.05%	0.05%	0.67%
Native Hawaiian or Pacific Islander alone (NH)	0	0	0	0.00%	0.00%	0.00%
Other race alone (NH)	2	2	2	0.09%	0.10%	0.11%
Multiracial (NH)	7	12	24	0.33%	0.61%	1.34%
Hispanic or Latino (any race)	1,482	1,360	1,055	69.87%	68.65%	59.00%
Total	2,121	1,981	1,788	100.00%	100.00%	100.00%

=== 2020 census ===
As of the 2020 census, Marfa had a population of 1,788. The median age was 47.8 years; 16.2% of residents were under 18 and 24.6% were 65 or older. For every 100 females, there were 95.4 males, and for every 100 females 18 and over, there were 95.1 males 18 and over.

None of residents lived in urban areas, while 100.0% lived in rural areas.

Of the 838 households in Marfa, 20.8% had children under 18 living in them, 36.8% were married-couple households, 22.0% were households with a male householder and no spouse or partner present, and 34.2% were households with a female householder and no spouse or partner present. About 39.0% of all households were made up of individuals, and 17.3% had someone living alone who was 65 or older.

The city had 1,077 housing units, of which 22.2% were vacant. The homeowner vacancy rate was 3.0% and the rental vacancy rate was 11.6%.

Racial composition as of the 2020 census
Race	Number	Percent
White	1,040	58.2%
Black or African American	15	0.8%
American Indian and Alaska Native	18	1.0%
Asian	13	0.7%
Native Hawaiian and other Pacific Islander	0	0.0%
Some other race	229	12.8%
Two or more races	473	26.5%
Hispanic or Latino (of any race)	1,055	59.0%

=== 2010 census ===
As of the 2010 United States census, 1,981 people, 864 households, and 555 families resided in the city. The population density was 1,354 inhabitants per square mile (523/km^{2}). The 1,126 housing units averaged 719.1 per square mile (276.9/km^{2}). The racial makeup of the city was 30% White, 0.4% African American, 0.2% Native American, 0.05% Asian, 7.50% from other races, and 0.75% from two or more races. Hispanics or Latinos of any race were 68.7% of the population. Of 863 households, 29.3% had children under 18 living with them, 47.4% were married couples living together, 13.1% had a female householder with no husband present, and 35.6% were not families. About 31.4% of all households were made up of individuals, and 17.3% had someone living alone who was 65 or older. The average household size was 2.35, and the average family size was 2.99. The age distribution of the population was 24.9% under 18, 7.9% from 18 to 24, 24.2% from 25 to 44, 24.5% from 45 to 64, and 18.5% who were 65 or older. The median age was 39 years. For every 100 females, there were 101.8 males. For every 100 females 18 and over, there were 100.9 males. The median income in the city for a household was $24,712 and for a family was $32,328. Males had a median income of $25,804 versus $18,382 for females. The per capita income for the city was $14,636. About 15.7% of families and 20.6% of the population were below the poverty line, including 24.6% of those under 18 and 26.9% of those 65 or over.

== Arts and culture ==
The area around Marfa is known as a cultural center for contemporary artists and artisans. In 1971, Minimalist artist Donald Judd moved to Marfa from New York. After renting summer houses for a few years, he bought two large hangars and some smaller buildings and began to install his art permanently. He had started hanging his art in New York, but the buildings in Marfa allowed him to install his works on a larger scale. In 1976, he bought the first of two ranches that became his primary places of residence, continuing a long appreciation for the desert landscape surrounding Marfa. Later, with assistance from the Dia Art Foundation in New York, Judd acquired the now decommissioned Fort D. A. Russell, and in 1979 began transforming the fort's buildings into art spaces. Judd's vision was to house large collections of individual artists' work on permanent display, as a sort of antimuseum. Judd believed the prevailing model of many museums, where various art exhibits are shown for limited times, does not allow the viewer an understanding of artists or their work as they had intended.

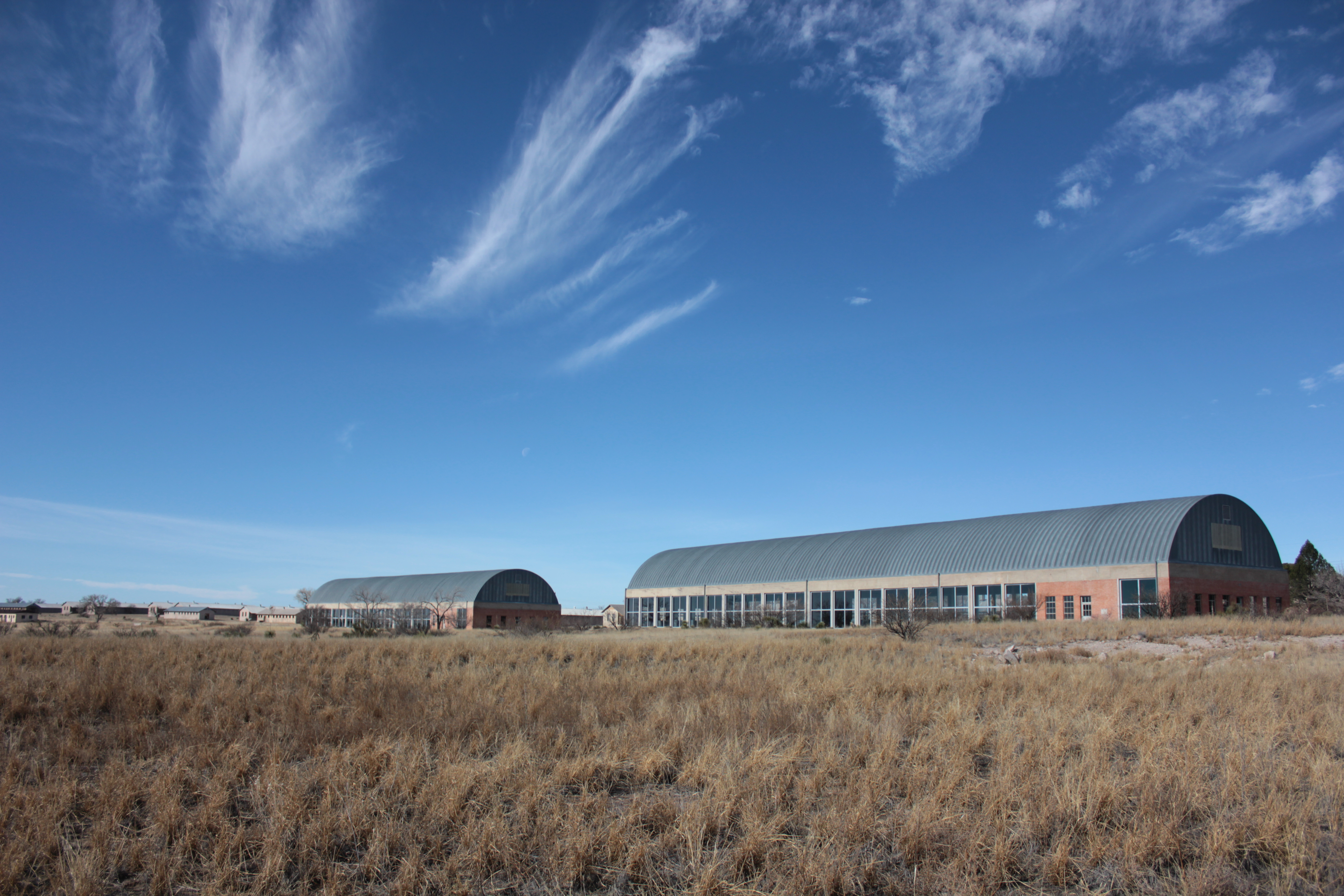
The Chinati Foundation

Following Judd's death in 1994, two foundations have worked to maintain his legacy, the Chinati Foundation and Judd Foundation. Since its inauguration in 1986, Chinati has held an annual open-house event, Chinati Weekend, that attracts visitors from around the world to visit Marfa's art. Between 1997 and 2008, both foundations sponsored this event. The Chinati Foundation now occupies more than 30 buildings in Marfa and has permanently displayed work by 13 artists.

The Lannan Foundation established a writers-in-residence program starting in 1998, bringing a myriad of writers and other creatives to Marfa every year until the program wound down in 2022. As a result, despite its remoteness, Marfa had an unusually vibrant and contemporary literary presence.

In recent years, a new wave of artists has moved to Marfa to live and work. As a result, new gallery spaces have opened in the downtown area. The Crowley Theater and its annex host public events with seating for over 175, a Marfa theater group has formed, and since 2003, a multifunctional art space called Ballroom Marfa has shown art films, hosted musical performances, and exhibited other art installations. The city is also 37 miles (60 km) from Prada Marfa, a pop art exhibit, and is home to Cobra Rock Boot Company and The Wrong Store.

Marfa Myths, an annual music festival and multidisciplinary cultural program, was founded in 2014 by the nonprofit contemporary arts foundation Ballroom Marfa and Brooklyn-based music label Mexican Summer. The festival brought together a diversity of emerging and established artists and musicians to work creatively and collaboratively across music, film, and visual-arts contexts. The festival was inherently embedded in the landscape of Far West Texas and deeply engaged with Marfa's cultural history and community. The festival wound down in 2019, though, with other musical and cultural weekends such as Agave Festival aiming to continue similar aims.

Since 2021, Marfa has also hosted an annual weekend of exhibitions, talks and screenings devoted to digital art, organized by Art Blocks, a platform for generative art that opened a gallery in the town that year. The programming spans a wide range of digital and technology-based work, including generative art, video art and installations, and takes place in galleries, event spaces and other venues around town. The arrival of the gallery was initially met with some skepticism from local artists, however, by its sixth edition in October 2026, the event had grown in popularity, attracting hundreds of visitors to the town.

Building 98, also located in Marfa, is a project of the International Woman's Foundation, which has operated an artist-in-residency program since 2002. The foundation was responsible for placing Fort D.A. Russell on the National Register of Historic Places as an effort to preserve the historic importance of the site. The facility's studio galleries host artists who desire to exhibit work in the region at a premier venue. In late September 2012 through early April 2013, the foundation held a major retrospective of the works of Wilhelmina Weber Furlong at Building 98 featuring over 75 unseen works of the early American woman modernist. Building 98 is located at historic Fort D. A. Russell; it is also the home of Marfa's German POW murals. The facility also features the George Sugarman sculpture courtyard.

=== Marfa lights ===
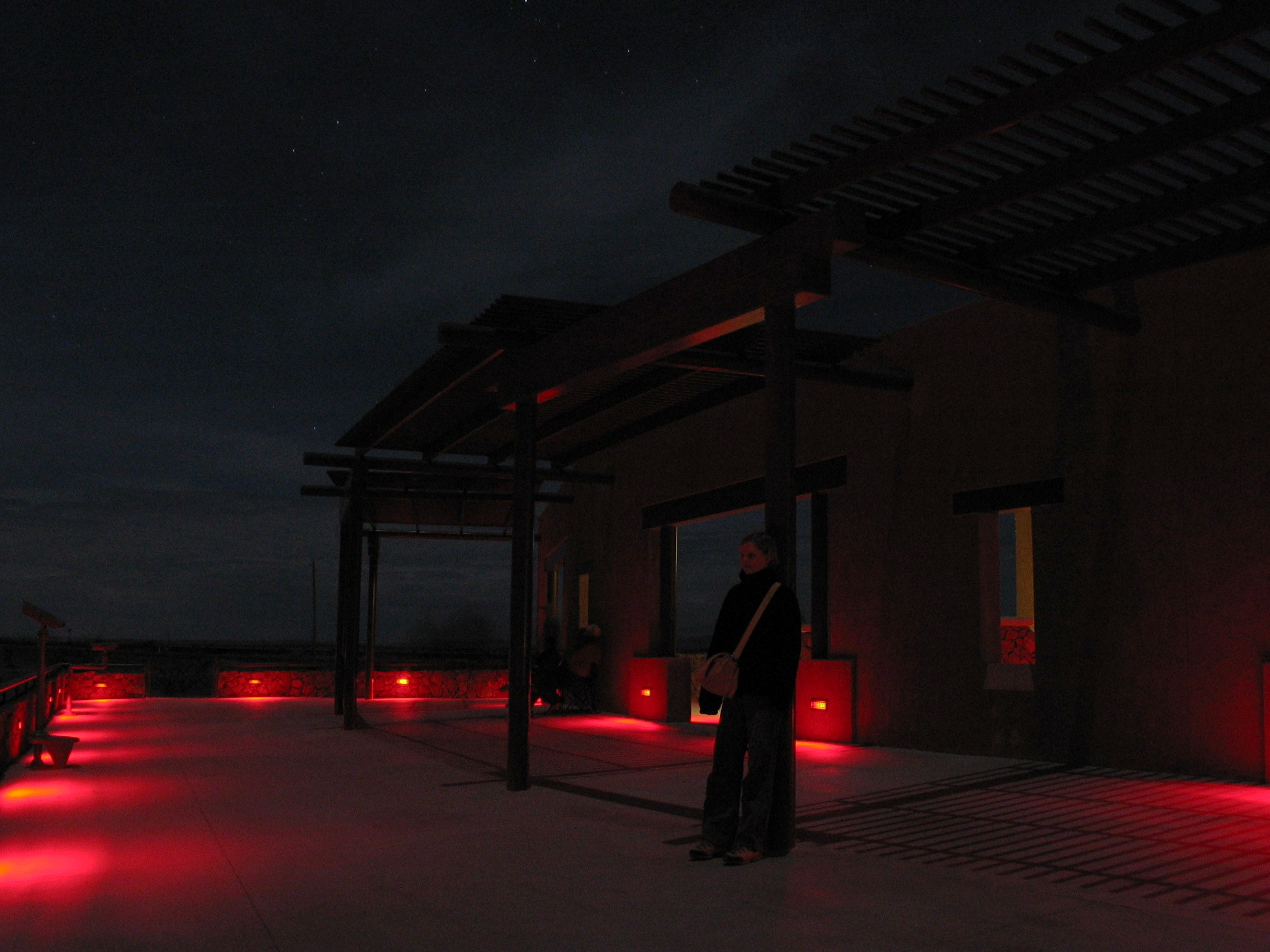
Official viewing platform for the Marfa lights

Marfa is the location of the Marfa lights, visible on clear nights between Marfa and the Paisano Pass when one is facing southwest (toward the Chinati Mountains). According to the Handbook of Texas Online, "at times, they appear colored as they twinkle in the distance. They move about, split apart, melt together, disappear, and reappear. Presidio County residents have watched the lights for over a hundred years." The first historical record of them dates to 1883. Presidio County has built a viewing station 9 miles east of town on US 67 near the site of the old air base. Each year, enthusiasts gather for the annual Marfa Lights Festival.

== In popular culture ==
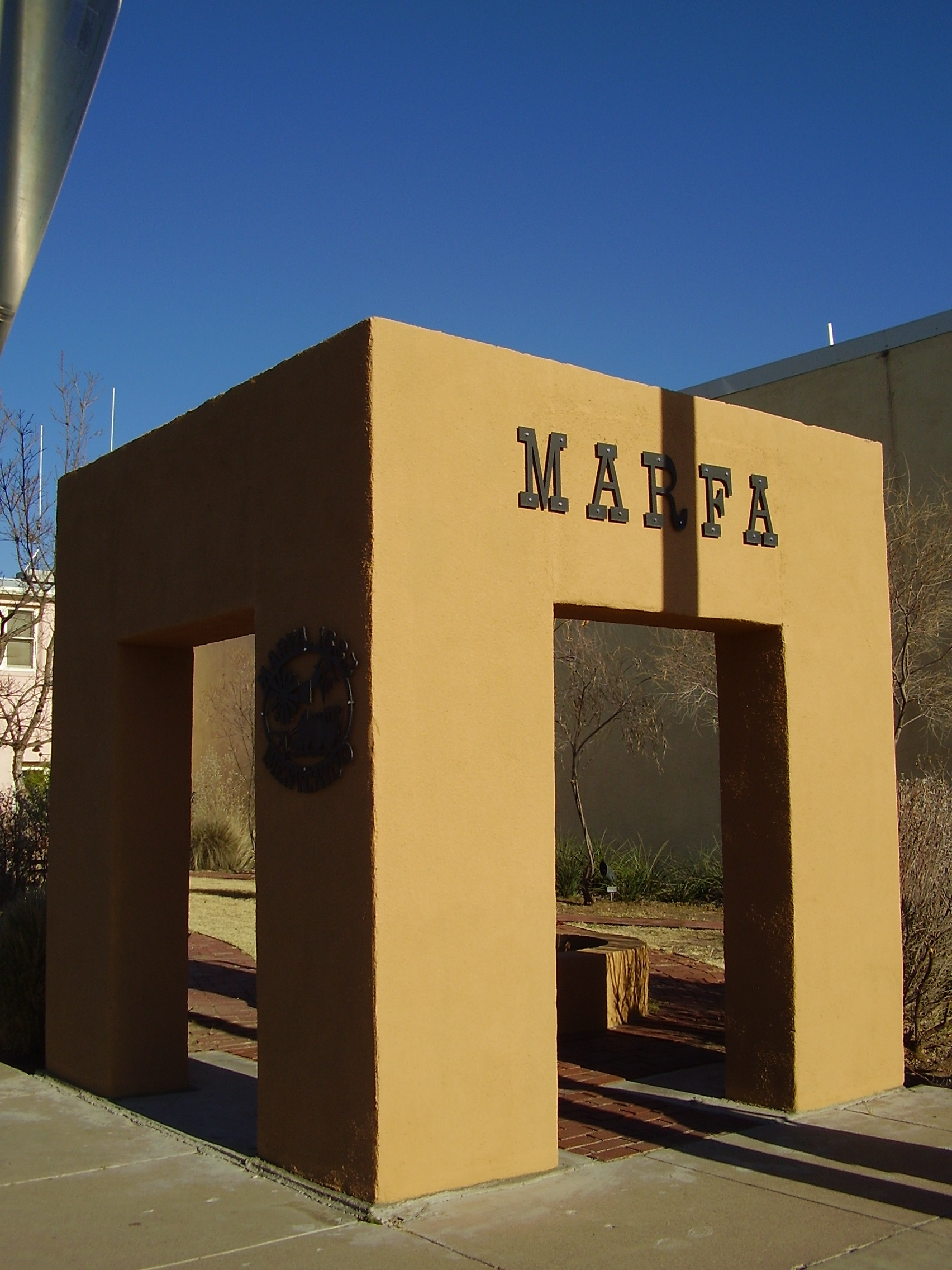
Marker of Marfa

Various movie productions have filmed in and around parts of Marfa. The 1950 film High Lonesome and the 1956 Warner Bros. film Giant were filmed in Marfa.

In August 2006, two films were partially shot in Marfa: There Will Be Blood and No Country for Old Men.

The music video for Between the Buried and Me's "Obfuscation" takes place in Marfa in the late '50s.

Larry Clark's 2012 film Marfa Girl was filmed exclusively in Marfa. Also, Far Marfa, written and directed by Cory Van Dyke, made its debut in 2012.

Morley Safer presented a 60 Minutes segment in on August 4, 2013, titled "Marfa, Texas, the Capital of Quirkiness".

In 2017, Marfa was featured as the setting of the Amazon series I Love Dick, an adaptation of Chris Kraus's 1997 novel, which was set in Pasadena, California.

Marfa was also the filming location for the music video of the xx song "On Hold".

Marfa is featured in the 2019 Simpsons episode "Mad About the Toy".

"Marfa" is the eighth track on Texas symphonic rock band Mother Falcon's second studio album, You Knew. It is also the name of songs by Wildcat! Wildcat!, S. Carey, and Paul Cauthen ("Marfa Lights").

Marfa is featured in Ben Lerner's 2014 novel 10:04.

Beyoncé references Marfa in the song "II Hands II Heaven" on her 2024 album, Cowboy Carter.

Parts of Due West (2025 film) were filmed in Marfa.

Parts of Fandango were filmed in Marfa, and the city is mentioned by name in the movie.

Marfa also became a source of inspiration for perfumery. French niche house Memo Paris released the unisex fragrance Marfa in 2016, created by perfumer Aliénor Massenet.

== Media ==
Marfa is home to National Public Radio-affiliated station KRTS. Marfa Public Radio both allows locals to play a diverse range of music during the edge hour time slots, as well as distributes local news stories online.

Marfa houses the offices of the Big Bend Sentinel, serving Marfa, and International/Internacional, serving Presidio, in one building. The former is a weekly newspaper covering the areas of Marfa, Fort Davis, Presidio, and far West Texas. Marfa Magazine is a yearly publication distributed from Marfa. It focuses on issues and general information about Marfa, Alpine, and Fort Davis.

== Infrastructure ==
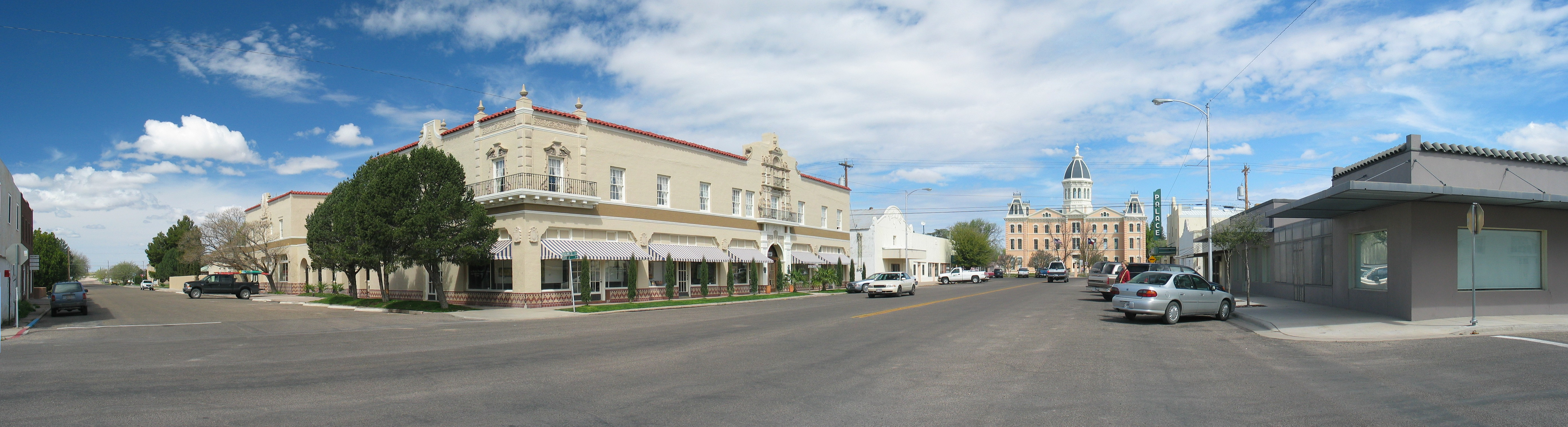
Hotel Paisano and the Presidio County Courthouse

On October 1, 2009, the city council voted to no longer have a local police department. At the time, the Presidio County Sheriff's Department and Texas Highway Patrol provided law enforcement for the city, as well as the county as a whole. As of 2019, however, the Marfa Police Department has been re-established, and five officers, including a chief and lieutenant, oversee law enforcement within the city limits.

== Education ==
Marfa is served by the Marfa Independent School District. Within it, Marfa Elementary School and Marfa Junior/Senior High School serve the city.

Hispanic students attended the segregated Blackwell School from 1909 to 1965. The school was authorized to be a National Historic Site in 2022.

Marfa International School, a private school, opened in 2012, serving students in grades 1–8, with scholarships available based on need, but it closed in 2016.

Presidio County is within the Odessa College District for community college.

=== Public library ===
Marfa and the surrounding area are served by the Marfa Public Library, which houses a diverse collection in a variety of formats. The library began in 1947 when the Marfa Lions Club and the Marfa Study Club agreed to establish a library for the citizens of the area. The library was originally housed in the historic U.S.O. building, but was moved to a city-owned building after the city took over the project. After meeting the requirements of the Texas State Library, it became a member of the Texas Trans-Pecos Library System. The present library building was donated to the City of Marfa in 1973 by the first chairperson, Laura Bailey, and her husband Bishop.

== Transportation ==
=== Highways ===
- US 90: U.S. Route 90 runs through the city along San Antonio St., leading northwest 74 miles (119 km) to Van Horn, with access to I-10 and east 26 miles (42 km) to Alpine.
- US 67: U.S. Route 67 runs south from town along S Highland Ave., leading 59 miles (95 km) to Presidio and 60 miles (97 km) to the Presidio-Ojinaga International Border Crossing. At the intersection of Highland Ave. and San Antonio St., US 67 runs concurrently with US 90 through Alpine before turning north towards Fort Stockton.
- SH 17: Texas State Highway 17 meanders north through town, following Highland St., E Lincoln St., and N Dean St., before leading 21 miles (34 km) north towards Fort Davis.

=== Rail ===
Amtrak's Sunset Limited, which operates between New Orleans and Los Angeles three days a week, passes through the city, but does not stop; the nearest station is located in Alpine, 26 mi (42 km) northeast.

=== Intercity bus ===
Marfa is served by All Aboard America!'s twice-daily service between Midland International Air and Space Port and |Presidio, with intermediate stops at Odessa, Crane, McCamey, Ft. Stockton, and Alpine.

=== Airports ===
Commercial air service is available at either Midland International Air and Space Port (IATA: MAF, ICAO: KMAF, FAA LID: MAF) or El Paso International Airport (IATA: ELP, ICAO: KELP, FAA LID: ELP). The airports are, respectively, 182 miles (292 km) northeast, and 189 miles (304 km) northwest. Marfa Municipal Airport (IATA: MRF, ICAO: KMRF, FAA LID: MRF) is a county-operated, public-use airport 3 miles (5 km) to the north of the city in unincorporated Presidio County.

== Notable people ==
- Robert Jay Matthews (1953–1984), neo-Nazi who founded The Order
