= List of parishes of the Diocese of El Paso =

This is a list of parishes of the Diocese of El Paso. It is located in the southwestern part of Texas in the United States.

== Vicariate of St. Peter (Westside) ==
This is a list of active parishes in El Paso, Westway and Canutillo.

Name	Image	Location	Description/notes
Holy Family		900 W Missouri Ave, El Paso	Founded in 1916 for refugees from Mexican Revolution
Immaculate Conception		118 N Campbell St, El Paso	Parish founded and church dedicated in 1893
Immaculate Heart of Mary		8300 De Alva Dr, Westway	
Queen of Peace		1551 Belvidere St, El Paso	Founded in 1982, current church dedicated in 1994
San Judas Tadeo		4006 Hidden Way, El Paso	Founded in 1973, current church dedicated in 1993
St. Francis of Assisi		5750 Doniphan Dr, El Paso	
St. Matthew the Evangelist		400 West Sunset Road, El Paso	Founded as Holy Apostles Parish in 1955, church dedicated as St. Matthew in 1960.
St. Luke		930 E Redd Rd, El Paso	Founded in 1992, current church consecrated in 2002
St. Patrick		7065 2nd Ave, Canutillo	
St. Patrick Cathedral		1118 N. Mesa St, El Paso	Dedicated in 1917, steeple and organ destroyed by lightning fire in 1988

== Vicariate of Saint Paul (Central) ==
This is a list of active parishes in El Paso.

Name	Image	Location	Description/notes
Guardian Angel		3021 Frutas Ave, El Paso	Church dedicated in 1908
Little Flower		171 Polo Inn Rd, El Paso	Founded as a mission in the 1930s, current church dedicated in 1990, became a parish that same year.
Our Lady of the Light		4700 Delta Dr, El Paso	Founded as a mission in the 1930s, current church dedicated in 1964 and became a parish that same year.
Our Lady of Sorrows		7700 South Rosedale Street, El Paso	
Sacred Heart		602 S Oregon St, El Paso	Founded in 1893 by Jesuits, current church dedicated in 1898
San Antonio de Padua		503 Hunter Dr, El Paso	Founded in 1968
San Juan Bautista		5649 Dailey Ave, El Paso	
Santo Nino De Atocha		210 S Clark Dr, El Paso	Founded in 1979, previously Clark Street Chapel
San Francisco Xavier		519 S Latta St, El Paso	Founded as a parish in 1934, church dedicated in 1939.
St. Ignatius		408 Park St, El Paso	Current church dedicated in 1913, parish erected in 1921.
St. Paul the Apostle		7424 Mimosa Ave, El Paso	Founded as a mission in 1965, became a parish in 1976
St. Pius X		1050 N Clark Dr, El Paso	Founded in 1955, current church dedicated in 1993

== Vicariate of St. John (Northeast) ==
This is a list of active parishes in El Paso.

Name	Image	Location	Description/notes
All Saints		1415 Dakota St, El Paso	Founded in 1967
Blessed Sacrament		9025 Diana Dr, El Paso	Founded as a mission in 1955, current church dedicated in 1957 and became a parish that same year
Christ the Savior		5301 Wadsworth Ave, El Paso	Founded in 1982
Most Holy Trinity		10000 Pheasant Rd, El Paso	
Our Lady of the Assumption		4805 Byron St, El Paso	Founded in 1952
Our Lady of Guadalupe		2709 Alabama St, El Paso	
St. Joseph		3729 Hueco Ave, El Paso	Founded in 1916

== Vicariate of St. Matthew (Mission Valley) ==
This is a list of active parishes and missions in El Paso and other communities.

Name	Image	Location	Description/notes
Corpus Cristi		9205 North Loop Dr, El Paso	
Cristo Rey		8011 Williamette Ave, El Paso	
La Purisma Socorro Mission		328 S Nevarez Rd, Socorro	First mission constructed in 1682, current mission dedicated in 1839
Our Lady of Guadalupe		127 W Main St, Fabens	
Our Lady of Mt. Carmel – Ysleta Mission		131 S Zaragosa Rd, El Paso	Founded as the Ysleta Mission in 1682, it is the oldest mission in Texas. Current church constructed in 1851
Our Lady of the Valley		8600 Winchester Rd, El Paso	Founded in 19435 and current church dedicated that year.
San Elceario – San Elizario Mission		1556 San Elizario Rd, San Elizario	Founded in 1789 with establishment of San Elceario Presidio. Current chapel dedicated in 1877
San Felipe de Jesus		401 Passmore Rd, El Paso	
San Lorenzo		611 Avenida De San Lorenzo, Clint	Founded as a mission in 1913, chapel dedicated in 1914, became a parish in 1970
Santa Teresa de Jesus		1042 N Knox St, Fort Hancock	Founded in 1920
St. John Paul II		518 Gallagher St, El Paso	Merger of San Lucia Parish (1978) and San Jose Parish (1897)
Ss. Peter and Paul		673 Old Hueco Tanks Rd, El Paso	Founded in 1967, current church dedicated in 2002

== Vicariate of Our Lady of Guadalupe (Eastside) ==
This is a list of parishes and one mission in El Paso and Horizon city.

Name	Image	Location	Description/notes
El Buen Pastor Mission		311 Peyton Rd, El Paso	Became a mission of Holy Spirit Parish in 2014
Holy Spirit		14600 Horizon Blvd, Horizon City	Founded as a mission in 1975, current church dedicated in 1980, became a parish in 2014
San Juan Diego		14520 Montana Ave, El Paso	
San Pedro de Jesus Maldonado		3000 Tim Foster St, El Paso	
St. Frances Xavier Cabrini		12200 Vista Del Sol Dr, El Paso	
St. Mark		11700 Pebble Hills Blvd, El Paso	Founded in 1992, current church dedicated in 2004
St. Raphael		2301 Zanzibar Rd, El Paso	Founded as a mission in 1966, became a parish in 1967, current church dedicated in 1979
St. Stephen Deacon and Martyr		1700 George Dieter Dr, El Paso	Founded in 1986, current church dedicated in 2009

== Vicariate of St. Mark (West Texas) ==
This is a list of parishes and missions in West Texas.

Name	Image	Location	Description/notes
Our Lady of Fatima		308 Almond St, Van Horn	
Our Lady of Miracles Mission		556 East Cavender St, Sierra Blanca	Mission operated by Our Lady of Fatima Parish
Our Lady of Peace Parish		406 S 6th St, Alpine	Founded in 1888, current church dedicated in 1942
Our Lady of Peace Mission		11745 FM 170, Candelaria	Founded in 1917, operated as mission by Santa Teresa de Jesús
Sacred Heart Mission		Ruidosa	Church completed in 1915, now owned by the Friends of the Ruidosa Church
Sacred Heart Mission		107 Church Rd, Shafter	Founded in 1890, community now a ghost town. Operated as mission by Santa Teresa de Jesús
Sacred Heart Mission		201 California Ave, Valentine	Founded in 1912. Operated as a mission by St. Mary Parish
San Isidro Mission		6148 Westside Rd, Dell City	
San Jose Mission		18339 FM170, Redford	Founded in 1870s, current church dedicated in 1970. Operated as mission by Santa Teresa de Jesús
Santa Teresa de Jesús		1101 O Reilly St, Presidio	Founded as a mission in 1870, current church dedicated around 1912, became a parish in 1916
St. Joseph Mission		800 State Street North Highway 118, Fort Davis	Founded in 1876, current church consecrated in 1929. Operated as mission by Our Lady of Peace Parish
St. Mary Mission		203 NW 3rd St, Marathon	Operated as mission by Our Lady of Peace Parish
St. Mary Parish		211 W San Antonio St, Marfa	Current church started construction in 1899.

== Vicariate of St. Luke (West Texas) ==
This is a list of parishes and missions in Pecos, Kermit and other communities in West Texas.

Name	Image	Location	Description/notes
Christ the King Mission		8666-8692 Co Rd 316, Balmorhea	
Our Lady of Refuge Mission		201 Brant Ave, Barstow	
Santa Rosa de Lima		620 E 4th St, Pecos	Founded as mission in 1889, became a parish in 1939
St. Catherine		1201 S Plum St, Pecos,	Church constructed in 1893
St. Emily Mission		Grand St, Toyah	Located in a ghost town, operated as mission by Santa Rosa de Lima Parish
St. Gertrude Mission		120 E Ave, Grandfalls	Founded in 1890s. Operated by St. John the Apostle Parish.
St. John the Apostle and Evangelist		500 S Ike Ave, Monahans	
St. Joseph Mission		401 South Sycamore St, Kermit	Church constructed in 1960
St. Thomas		838 Bellaire St, Kermit,	Founded in 1950

== Shrines ==
This is a listing of shrines in the diocese.

Name	Image	Location	Description/notes
Our Lady of Guadalupe			

== See also ==
- Roman Catholic Diocese of El Paso
