= Farm to Market Road 170 =

State road in Presidio and Brewster counties in Texas, United States

Farm to Market Road 170

Route information
- Maintained by TxDOT
- Length: 114.580 mi (184.399 km)
- Existed: June 11, 1945–present

Major junctions
- West end: Chispa Road in Candelaria
- US 67 in Presidio; Spur 203 in Presido
- East end: SH 118 in Study Butte

Location
- Country: United States
- State: Texas
- Counties: Presidio, Brewster

Highway system
- Highways in Texas; Interstate; US; State; Former; Toll; Loops; Spurs; FM/RM; Park; Rec
← RM 169	→ FM 171

Farm to Market Road 170 (FM 170) is a 114.6-mile (184.4 km) highway maintained by the Texas Department of Transportation (TxDOT) in Presidio and Brewster counties in Texas, United States. The route, known locally as the River Road, runs along the United States side of the Rio Grande which in Texas forms the international boundary between the U.S. and Mexico. The road runs from Candelaria through the city of Presidio as well as several smaller communities and former settlements to State Highway 118 in Study Butte near Big Bend National Park. The road also passes through the southern portion of Big Bend Ranch State Park.

The highway was first designated in 1945 and over the years was gradually extended outward from Presidio. Eastern portions of the road in Brewster County, however, had several previous highway designations going back to 1939.

In addition to SH 118 in Study Butte, FM 170 has highway intersections in Presidio with U.S. Route 67 and its auxiliary route Business U.S. Route 67-A along with State Highway Spur 203.

== Route description ==
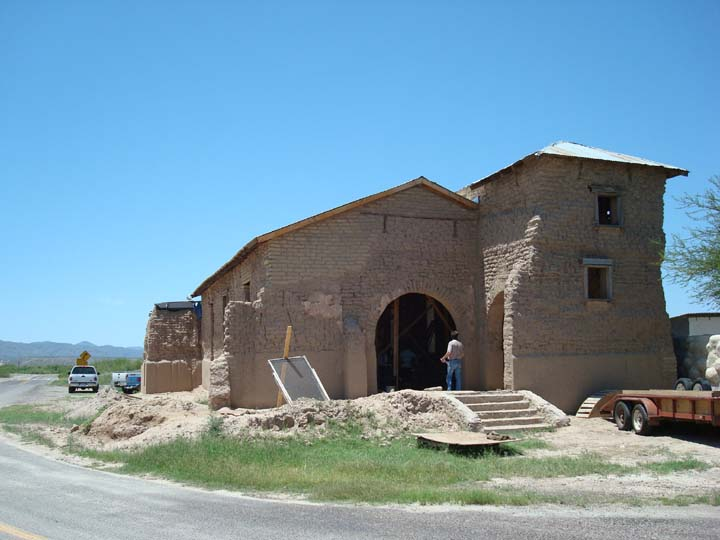
Ruins of Sacred Heart Mission along FM 170 in Ruidosa

FM 170 begins at Candelaria at the termination of the Chispa Road, a rugged, unpaved county road in Presidio and Jeff Davis counties that connects to US 90 by way of FM 2017 between Van Horn and Valentine. Although the two-lane road follows along the Rio Grande between Candelaria and Presidio, the river is largely obscured from the road by farm land.

Approximately 12 miles (19 km) from Candelaria, the road reaches Ruidosa where the road passes directly by the ruins of an historic adobe Catholic church and intersects the Pinto Canyon Road, an unpaved county road to Marfa by way of RM 2810. Along the remaining 36 miles (58 km) to Presidio, the road passes through the former communities or ghost towns of Chinati, Adobes, Indio, and Ochoa.

The road merges with US 67 just north of Presidio, the only incorporated city along its route. At a point where Bus. US 67-A separates from US 67, FM 170 follows the business route. At Erma Ave., the route intersects Spur 203 and the route turns south to O'Reilly St. where FM 170 separates from Bus. US 67-A. FM 170 then follows a winding path west along O'Reilly St., then south along Hurd Ave. where it crosses the South Orient Rail Line, then west along Millington Blvd., then south along Fourth St. before leaving the city's street grid to the southwest. Just outside Presidio, FM 170 passes Fort Leaton State Historic Site.

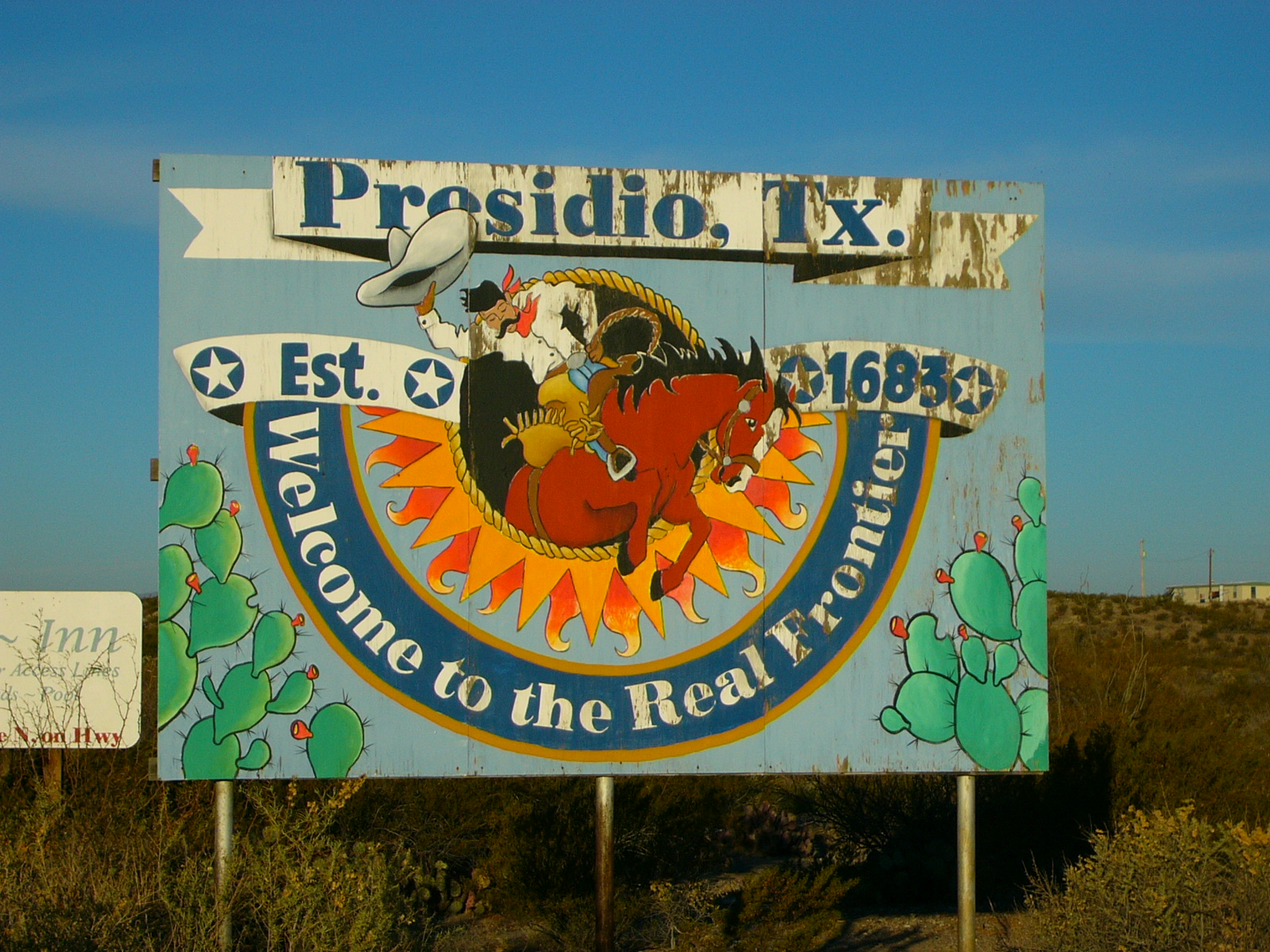
The "Welcome to Presidio sign"

West of Redford, FM 170 intersects Casa Piedra Road, an unpaved county route that provides access to the headquarters of Big Bend Ranch State Park and Marfa by way of RM 169. From this point forward to Lajitas, much of the road passes through Big Bend Ranch State Park where the road becomes more mountainous with sharp curves and steep grades. Within the park, there are several campgrounds, picnic areas, trail heads, and an old movie set. The road briefly turns away from the river at Colorado Canyon.

At Lajitas, the road permanently turns away from the river to go to Terlingua. Just east of Lajitas is the Texas Parks and Wildlife Department's Barton Warnock Environmental Education Center. At Terlingua, FM 170 passes near the old ghost town of this former mining community. The road then terminates at Study Butte 3 miles (5 km) from the entrance to Big Bend National Park.

== History ==
=== Previous designations in Brewster County ===
==== State Highway 227 ====
The earliest portion of the present route to be designated as part of the state highway system was the section between Terlingua and Study Butte which was assigned in September 1939 as part of a spur to SH 227. This spur continued on to connect with the main highway at the present junction of the north end Old Maverick Road and the road to Panther Junction within Big Bend National Park. SH 227 at the same time was newly designated as a road from Santa Elena Canyon to Panther Junction via the Old Maverick Road and then to Persimmon Gap and Marathon along the present US 385.

==== State Highway 118 ====
One month later, this spur was reassigned as part of SH 118. At that time, SH 118 south of Alpine departed from its present route near Adobe Walls Mountain to Terlingua rather than going directly to Study Butte as it does today. From Terlingua, SH 118 then proceeded eastward through Study Butte to SH 227.

==== State Highway Spur 121 ====
In 1941, the designation of SH 118 along the road between Alpine and Terlingua was canceled and returned to county maintenance. The road from Terlingua through Study Butte to SH 227 was re-designated as Spur 121 until that designation was canceled in 1946. The portion within the newly created Big Bend National Park was incorporated into the park's road system. The remainder between Terlingua to the park boundary near Study Butte reverted to county maintenance.

==== Ranch to Market Road 2462 ====
By 1951, SH 118 had been incrementally extended south of Alpine to the park boundary along its present alignment through Study Butte and over the portion of the former spur road to the park boundary. State maintenance between Terlingua and Study Butte was reestablished as RM 2462 in 1956. RM 2462 was then extended westward to the Presidio County line just west of Lajitas in 1957.

=== Current designation and extensions beyond Presidio ===
FM 170 was originally designated as a 5.0-mile (8.0 km) highway from US 67 in Presidio northwest to Ochoa. On December 16, 1948, the road was extended to the northwest an additional 13.9 miles (22.4 km) to Adobes and to the southeast to a point 6.3 miles (10.1 km) from Presidio. On July 15, 1949, the road was extended 11.7 miles (18.8 km) to Redford. The road was extended on October 29, 1953 further to the northwest 13.9 miles (22.4 km) to Pinto Canyon. Further construction to the northwest would then undergo a long hiatus.

On July 28, 1955, with construction focusing toward the southeast, the road was extended 5.2 miles (8.4 km) beyond Redford. On October 31, 1958, the road was extended an additional 13.9 miles (22.4 km), and FM 170 was changed to Ranch to Market Road 170 (RM 170). On February 5, 1960, RM 170 received its final extension to the southeast to RM 2462 at the Brewster County line. The RM 2462 designation was then canceled with that road combined with RM 170 for a total extension of 38.0 miles (61.2 km) to its present terminus at SH 118.

With southeastward road-building complete, expansion to the northwest resumed on June 2, 1967 with an 8.5-mile (13.7 km) to Ruidosa. Between 1967 and 1981, RM 170 was changed to FM 170. Ruidosa would remain the northwest terminus for fourteen years until the road was finally extended an additional 11.6 miles (18.7 km) to its present terminus at Candelaria on October 21, 1981.

On June 18, 1996, FM 170 was rerouted on Presidio's north side to follow concurrently along the route of US 67 and Bus. US 67-A abandoning a short section of road east of US 67. This was due to the relocation of US 67 away from the town center toward the Presidio-Ojinaga International Bridge with much of US 67's former route through town being replaced by the newly designated Bus. US 67-A, Spur 203, and Spur 310.

== Major intersections ==
County	Location	mi	km	Destinations	Notes
Presidio	Candelaria	0.0	0.0	Chispa Road	Western terminus
Presidio		47.8	76.9	US 67 north – Marfa	Western end of US 67 concurrency; T intersection
Presidio		47.9	77.1	Erma Avenue south Utopia Road west	Erma Avenue was formerly Spur 310 and previously the routing of US 67 / FM 170
Presidio	Presidio	48.3	77.7	US 67 south – Bus. US 67, Ojinaga (Chihuahua) Bus. US 67 ends	Eastern end of US 67 concurrency; western end of Bus. US 67 concurrency; T intersection
Presidio	Presidio	48.7	78.4	Spur 203 north (Erma Avenue)	Former routing of US 67 / FM 170; Y intersection
Presidio	Presidio	49.3	79.3	Bus. US 67 south (O'Reilly Street) – US 67	Eastern end of US 67 concurrency; T intersection
Brewster	Study Butte	115.8	186.4	SH 118 north – Alpine, Fort Davis SH 118 south – Big Bend National Park Headquarters	Eastern terminus; T intersection
1.000 mi = 1.609 km; 1.000 km = 0.621 mi: Concurrency terminus

== See also ==
- List of Farm to Market Roads in Texas
