= Chinati Mountains =

Mountains in Texas, United States

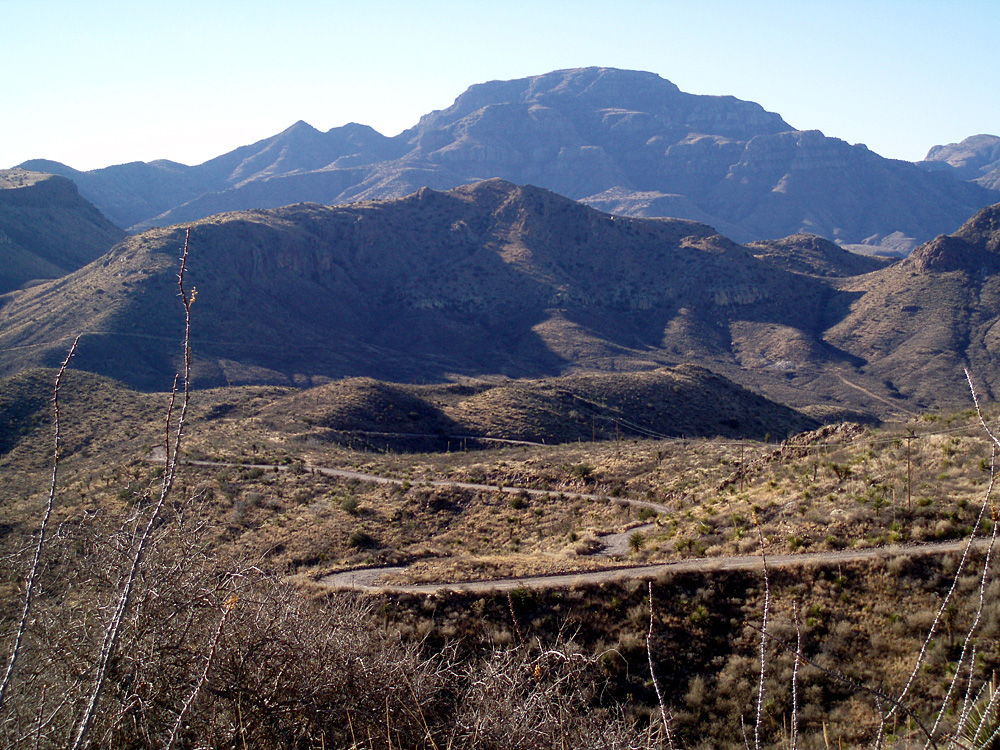
- Pinto Canyon Road in the Chinati Mountains

Highest point
- Peak: Chinati Peak
- Elevation: 7,728 ft (2,355 m)
- Coordinates: 29°54′N 104°28′W

Geography
- Location within Texas
- Country: United States
- State: Texas

Geology
- Rock type: Igneous

The Chinati Mountains of Texas are a small range in the high desert of far West Texas near the city of Presidio. A pass through the mountains on Ranch to Market Road 2810, also known as Pinto Canyon Road, connects to Farm to Market Road 170 at Ruidosa, Texas. Some believe the range derives its name from the Apache word ch'íná'itíh, which means gate or mountain pass.

The mountains are primarily composed of igneous and metamorphic rocks and are believed to be the remains of a number of explosive volcanic caldera-building events in the remote past. The mountains are generally not forested, but rather vegetated with grasses, cactus, and brush typical of the Chihuahuan Desert. The Chinatis were extensively mined for silver from the 1860s through the 1910s.

The highest point in the range is Chinati Peak, with an elevation of 7,728 feet (2,355 m). Chinati Peak is also the highest point in Presidio County. It serves as a major landmark for the surrounding area, and its dome-shaped hump can be seen rising prominently in the distance to the southwest from US 90 between Van Horn and Marfa. Chinati Peak is encircled by jagged desert peaks and rugged canyons. The summit of Chinati Peak is broad and relatively flat, but it is surrounded by cliffs and brush-filled drainages on all sides. Sierra Parda, at 7,185 feet (2,190 m), is the second-highest peak in the range.

The Texas Parks and Wildlife Department received a donation from the Richard King Mellon Foundation of 38,137 acres (15,433 ha) acres in the Chinati Mountains in the 1996 and established Chinati Mountains State Natural Area. Texas Parks and Wildlife is in the process of conducting multiyear surveys and development of the area. As of 2026, access to the land is limited.

== See also ==
- Chinati Mountain Caldera Complex
- Infernito Caldera
