= Texas State Highway Spur 203 =

State highway spurt in Presidio County, Texas, United States

State Highway Spur 203
- Erma Avenue
- Spur 203 highlighted in red

Route information
- Maintained by TxDOT
- Length: 0.770 mi (1,239 m)
- Existed: June 18, 1996–present

Major junctions
- South end: Bus. US 67 / FM 170 in Presidio
- North end: End of state maintenance north of Presidio

Location
- Country: United States
- State: Texas
- Counties: Presidio

Highway system
- Highways in Texas; Interstate; US; State; Former; Toll; Loops; Spurs; FM/RM; Park; Rec
← Spur 202	→ Loop 204

Spur 203 (Erma Avenue) is a 0.770-mile (1.239 km) state highway spur in Presidio County, Texas, United States, that runs north from U.S. Route 67 Business / Farm to Market Road 170 (US 67 Bus. / FM 170) in Presidio.

== Route description ==
Spur 203 begins at Erma Avenue, signed as US 67 Bus. / FM 170, in Presidio. The highway travels north for 0.770-mile (1.239 km) before ending at a cul-de-sac.

== History ==
Spur 203 was originally assigned on January 27, 1948 to a business loop of U.S. Route 75 (US 75) in McKinney in Collin County from US 75 (now Texas State Highway 5) via Tennessee street to US 75. On May 25, 1954, the route began to be also signed as business US 75. This routing was decommissioned and removed from the state highway system on October 28, 1961.

Spur 203 was reassigned on October 21, 1977 to a business loop of U.S. Route 277 (US 277) in Weinert in Haskell County. This was signed as a business route of US 277, but was transferred to U.S. Route 277 Business on June 21, 1990.

Spur 203 was designated along its current route on June 18, 1996 as a replacement for the former routing of US route 67 north of Presidio. Spur 203 was designated, along with former Texas State Highway Spur 310 (Spur 201), when the old bridge between these routes over Cibolo Creek was removed in 1996. On January 27, 2003, Spur 310 was cancelled.

== Major intersections ==
The entire route is in Presidio County.

Location	mi	km	Destinations	Notes
Presidio	0.000	0.000	Bus. US 67 north / FM 170 west – US 67 Bus. US 67 south / FM 170 east (Erma Avenue) – US 67, Redford	Southern terminus; T intersection
	0.770	1.239	Cul-de-sac	Northern terminus
1.000 mi = 1.609 km; 1.000 km = 0.621 mi

== See also ==
- List of state highway spurs in Texas
