= Chinati Mountains State Natural Area =

State park in Texas, United States

- IUCN category V (protected landscape/seascape)
- Interactive map of Chinati Mountains State Natural Area
- Location: Presidio County, Texas, United States
- Nearest city: Presidio
- Coordinates: 29°54′0″N 104°33′36″W
- Area: 39,000 acres (160 km^{2})
- Established: 1996
- Visitors: 60,000 (projected)
- Governing body: Texas Parks and Wildlife Department
- Website: Official site

Chinati Mountains State Natural Area (CMSNA) is a 39,000-acre (16,000 ha) state park in Presidio County, Texas, United States near the international border with Mexico. The park is under development and is managed by the Texas Parks and Wildlife Department. Road projects are in progress with possible limited access for small groups in 2026 and a full opening in 2032.

== History ==
Human occupation in the Chinati Mountains and vicinity dates to the Archaic period about 8,000 years ago. The historic record began with sheep ranching in 1883. Mining started in the area in 1885 but transportation of materials to and from the remote area proved problematic. The land continued with sheep ranch operations under different owners until 1978 when it became more of a wildlife sanctuary.

In late 1996 the Richard King Mellon Foundation purchased 38,137 acres of the former sheep ranch and donated it to the Texas Parks and Wildlife Department in a deal brokered by The Conservation Fund. Texas Parks and Wildlife conducted multi-year surveys and started development of the CMSNA.

For many years, there was no public access to the land. Finally, in 2014, four tracts of land needed to open a public road were secured. A $4.5 million project by the Texas Department of Transportation will build a public entrance into the park, including paved and unpaved roadways.

== Nature ==
CMSNA is in the Chihuahuan Desert ecoregion. It has an abundance of springs, including a rare salt marsh ciénega. CMSNA is a dark-sky preserve after being added to Big Bend Ranch State Parks’ 2017 International Dark Sky Park designation from DarkSky International.

=== Plants ===
The lower elevations present deserts and xeric shrublands plants such as creosotebush, viscid acacia, ocotillo, lechuguilla, honey mesquite. Smooth sotol, Torrey's yucca, skeletonleaf goldeneye and prickly pear are common plants. Higher up are gray oak, grama grasses. Frémont cottonwood and Goodding's willow populate the wetter areas.

=== Animals ===
Forty species of mammals have been documented in the park so far. Ten of the mammal species are bats with the pallid bat being the most abundant followed by the canyon bat. Commonly sighted species are desert cottontail, black-tailed jackrabbits, aoudad, collared peccary, coyote, mule deer, and white-tailed deer. Gray fox, American badger, striped skunk and mountain lion are present but rarely spotted. Many species of rodents (including mice, rats, squirrels, gophers and porcupines) were catalogued with Nelson's pocket mouse being the most common followed by the cactus mouse. Hikers should be cautious of the venomous western diamondback rattlesnake.

== Activities ==
The park will offer camping and trails for hiking and equestrianism.

== See also ==
- List of Texas state parks
