= Joint Task Force North =

American counterdrug and anti-terrorist operation

Coordinates: 31°50′29″N 106°21′53″W

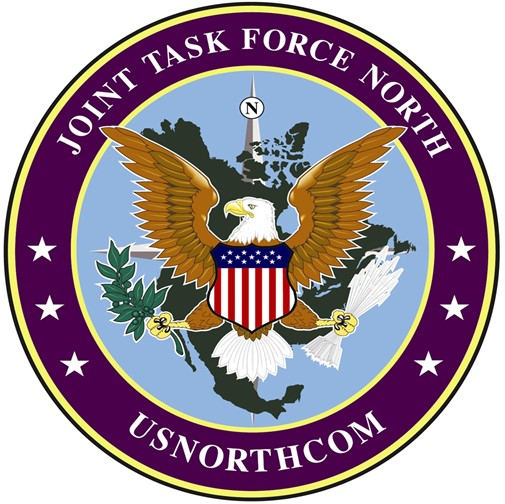
JTF North emblem

Joint Task Force North (JTF North), formerly Joint Task Force Six (JTF-6), is a multi-service operation by the United States Department of Defense for counterdrug and anti-terrorist operations. JTF-North is headquartered at Biggs Army Airfield, Fort Bliss, Texas. United States Northern Command is the controlling Unified Combatant Command.

Major General Henry S. Dixon assumed command on 9 December 2024, and is the 12th Commander of JTF-N.

== History ==
Well-known former members of Joint Task Force 6 include: General Kevin P. Byrnes, U.S. Army, Ret., JTF-6 Commanding General; Colonel Robert Love, USMC, Ret., and current Senior Executive Service (SES) member to the DoD's Task Force for Business and Stability Operations (TFBSO); Special Forces LTC Eric Buckland, U.S. Army, Ret., and Captain Kirk Harrington, owner of EFMC, LLC.

Joint Task Force North (JTF-North), a joint service command dedicated to homeland security and border support, cased its organizational colors during a ceremony hosted by Gen. Gregory Guillot, commander, North American Aerospace Defense Command and U.S. Northern Command, on June 3, 2026.

The ceremony marks the formal deactivation of the command, concluding a 37-year homeland defense mission. This transition is part of a broader USNORTHCOM and Department of War (DoW) strategic realignment to optimize resources, modernize force posture, and shift from temporary tactical operations to a permanent interagency network targeting complex transnational threats.

To ensure seamless continuity, JTF-North’s current headquarters, personnel, and assets will transition directly to support the Joint Interagency Task Force-Counter Cartel (JIATF-CC). Officially established on Jan. 15, 2026, and headquartered in Tucson, Arizona, JIATF-CC is specifically designed to identify, disrupt, and dismantle cartel operations along the U.S.-Mexico border.

== Mission casualties ==
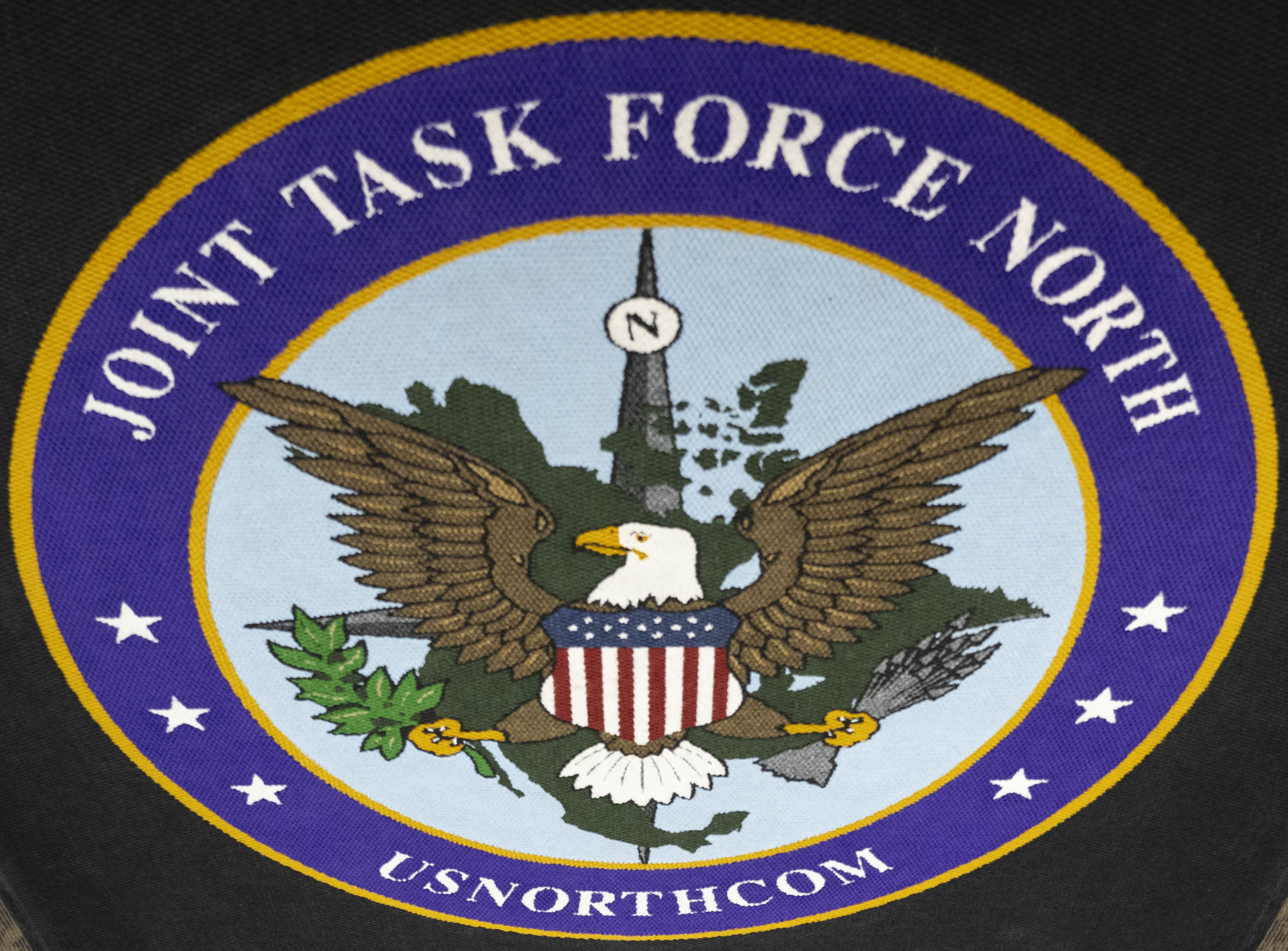
JTFN seal on floor

On 21 May 1995, during JTF-6 Mission "Smugglers Blues" (a joint air reconnaissance mission conducted along the US and Mexico border near Nogales, Arizona) Chief Warrant Officer 2 (CW2) Kevin L. Jenkins and Chief Warrant Officer 2 (CW2) John D. Peterson, both from Alpha Troop, 1st Squadron, 6th Cavalry Regiment (1/6 CAV) station in Fort Hood, Texas, died when their OH-58C helicopter crashed during a night surveillance mission.

On 2 June 1996, during JTF-6 Mission JT177-96, (a ground reconnaissance mission conducted in the Angeles National Forest, California) Lance Corporal Eric D. Davis of Company B, 1st Battalion, 5th Marine Regiment (1/5) died as the result of a fall.

== Scandals ==
On 20 May 1997, during an operation in Redford, Texas, near the United States–Mexico border, Corporal Clemente M. Banuelos, the leader of his squad, fatally shot 18-year-old American citizen Esequiel Hernández, Jr., on the American side of the border. He was holding a .22 caliber rifle he used to protect his herd of goats from predators. Marines alleged that he pointed the rifle at them, although they were some 200 yards away and heavily camouflaged in ghillie suits. No charges were brought at the time or subsequently.

The shooting inspired the 2005 film The Three Burials of Melquíades Estrada by Tommy Lee Jones. The 2007 documentary The Ballad of Esequiel Hernández explores the killing, analyzing both sides of the issue by interviewing the Hernández family and friends, the Marines, and local officials.
