= Esequiel Hernández Jr. =

American murder victim (1979–1997)

Esequiel Hernández
- Born: Esequiel Hernández Jr. May 14, 1979
- Died: May 20, 1997 (aged 18); Redford, Texas
- Known for: High school student killed by United States Marines

Esequiel Hernández Jr. (May 14, 1979 – May 20, 1997) was an 18-year-old American high school student killed on May 20, 1997, by United States Marines in Redford, Texas, located approximately one mile from the United States–Mexico border. Hernández was the first American civilian to be killed by military personnel while on duty in the United States since the 1970 Kent State shootings, and led to Secretary of Defense William Cohen issuing a temporary suspension of troop patrols near the U.S.–Mexico border. The shooting inspired the 2005 movie The Three Burials of Melquiades Estrada by Tommy Lee Jones, and the 2007 documentary The Ballad of Esequiel Hernandez.

== Death ==
U.S. Marines Ronald Wieler Jr., Ray Torres Jr., James Matthew Blood, and their fire-team leader, San Francisco native Clemente Bañuelos (all between the ages of 19 and 22), on drug patrol and heavily camouflaged in ghillie suits, came upon Hernández herding goats. The camouflaged Marines observed the 18-year-old high school student from concealment at a distance of approximately 200 yards while maintaining radio contact with their unit. Hernández, who was carrying a .22 caliber rifle that family members said he used to fend off predators, shot in the direction of the Marines. Continuing to call for Border Patrol assistance, the Marines proceeded to track Hernández for 20 minutes, until Bañuelos shot and killed him, with the bullet entering the armpit on his right side.

== Investigation ==
A congressional investigation into the killing was scheduled for September 1997. A grand jury examined the fatal shooting and considered criminal charges against the four Marines, but did not indict any of the Marines involved in the shooting. The Justice Department subsequently dropped its investigation. The Marine Corps also investigated the killing. In 1998, the U.S. government paid the Hernández family $1.9 million to settle a wrongful death claim. Clemente Bañuelos, the 22-year-old U.S. Marine who fatally shot Hernández, was not charged.

== Impact on policy ==
Following the killing, the militarization of the U.S.–Mexico border came under harsh scrutiny, with Defense Secretary William Cohen halting the use of military anti-drug patrols on the border, limiting the use of armed forces on the border for years to come. As then-president Donald Trump in 2018 ordered active-duty troops to the U.S.–Mexico border in Operation Faithful Patriot, the military killing of the teenager resurfaced in the public debate as a cautionary tale. In part due to the killing of Hernandez, many military officials continue to oppose domestic deployment of troops.

== The Ballad of Esequiel Hernandez ==
The 2007 documentary The Ballad of Esequiel Hernandez explores his killing by Marines, analysing both sides of the issue. It won best-documentary awards at the Mexico City Film Festival and Santa Fe Film Festival in 2007 and at the El Paso festival in 2008. It is directed by Kieran Fitzgerald and narrated by Tommy Lee Jones. The documentary premiered July 8, 2008 on PBS.

== See also ==
- Posse Comitatus Act
- Joint Task Force North
- War on drugs
