= Kieran Fitzgerald =

Kieran Fitzgerald may refer to:

- Kieran Fitzgerald, director of the 2007 American documentary film The Ballad of Esequiel Hernandez
- Kieran Fitzgerald (Gaelic footballer) (born 1981), Gaelic footballer from County Galway, Ireland
