= Alamito, Texas =

Ghost town in Texas, US

Alamito is a ghost town in Presidio County, Texas, United States. It was settled in 1870, by John Davis, alongside Hispanic families. A farming community, Davis transported crops from the town to Fort Stockton to sell. A post office operated there from 1884 to 1892. The community was abandoned after 1911.
