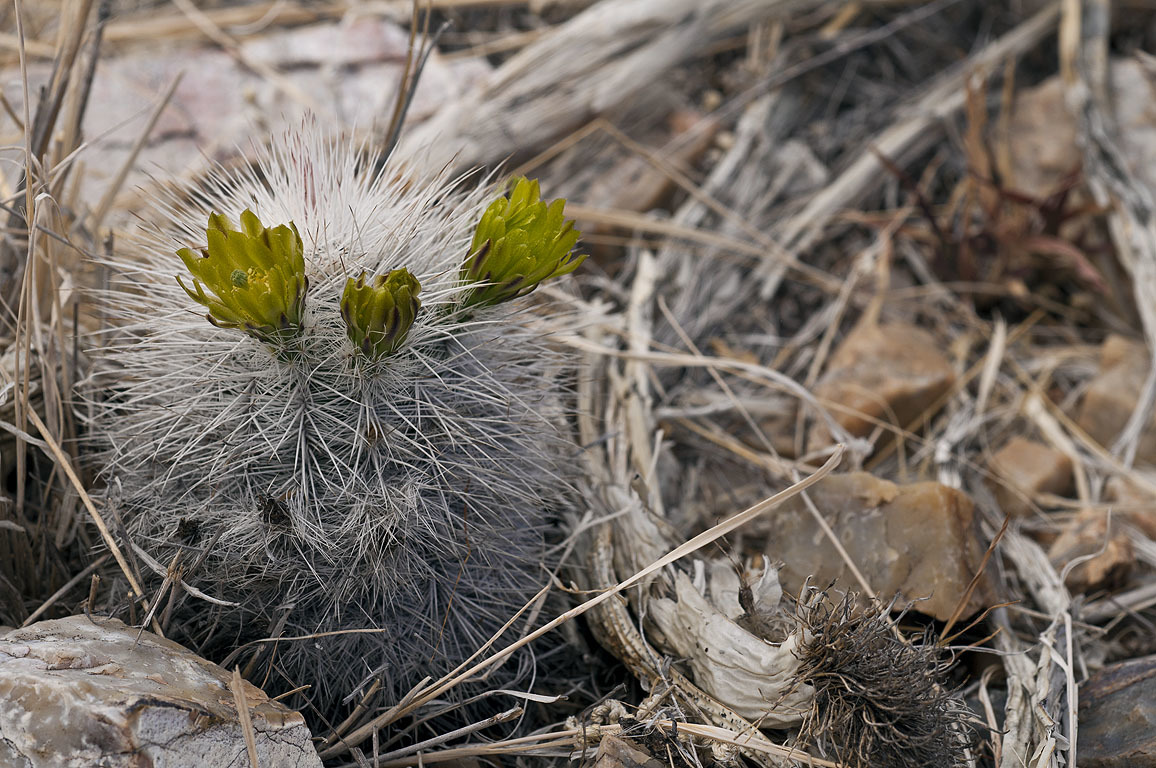

Scientific classification
- Kingdom: Plantae
- Clade: Tracheophytes
- Clade: Angiosperms
- Clade: Eudicots
- Order: Caryophyllales
- Family: Cactaceae
- Subfamily: Cactoideae
- Genus: Echinocereus
- Species: E. canus

Binomial name
- Echinocereus canus (A. M. Powell et J. F. Weedin) D.Felix & H.Bauer 2012

Synonyms
- Echinocereus viridiflorus var. canus Powell & Weedin. 2004

= Echinocereus canus =

Species of cactus

Echinocereus canus is a species of cactus native to Texas.

== Description ==
This cactus has a small spherical to ovoid, sometimes elongated or cylindrical in shape, stem 6 to 15 cm (2.4 to 5.9 in) tall and up to 3 to 6 cm (1.2 to 2.4 in) wide with 14 to 16 ribs. It is mostly unbranched but it may occur in squat clusters of several branches. The body of the plant is ridged and lined with many oval areoles bearing spines. The 8 to 15 central spines are white and are up to 1.7–2.5 cm (0.67–0.98 in) long. The 30 to 48 radial spines are also white and 2 to 3 cm (0.79 to 1.18 in) long. The flower is up to 3 cm (1.2 in) long light green to yellow green with a lemon fragrance. They are usually wide open, funnel-shaped and green to yellow-green. The fruits are ovoid, green and covered with spines. The fruit has black seeds. Chromosome count is 2n=22.

== Distribution ==
Plants are found growing on sandstone slopes in Presidio County, Texas at elevations between 1300 and 1600 meters.

== Taxonomy ==
The plant was discovered in 1984 by James Jeff Clark while doing a scientific survey. The plant was grown from seeds in the 1990s and described in 2004 as Echinocereus viridiflorus var. canus by A. Michael Powell and James F. Weedin. The variety was elevated to a species in 2012, the specific epithet "canus" referring to its grey hairs.
