= Adobes, Texas =

- Ghost town
- Location within Texas Adobes, Texas (the United States)
- Coordinates: 29°45′34″N 104°33′13″W
- Country: United States
- State: Texas
- County: Presidio
- Elevation: 2,671 ft (814 m)
- Time zone: UTC-6 (Central (CST))
  - Summer (DST): UTC-5 (CDT)
- ZIP codes: 79843
- Area code: 432
- GNIS feature ID: 2034918

Adobes was a small farming community and now a ghost town, located on the Rio Grande and Farm to Market Road 170 in Presidio County, Texas, United States. It was founded in the 1870s. Cotton began to be grown in the area in 1914, and by 1930 the community had 750 acres (300 ha) of irrigated land.
