= Chinati, Texas =

- Unincorporated community
- Location within Texas
- Coordinates: 29°49′27″N 104°36′21″W
- Country: United States
- State: Texas
- County: Presidio
- Elevation: 2,694 ft (821 m)
- Time zone: UTC-6 (Central (CST))
  - Summer (DST): UTC-5 (CDT)
- ZIP codes: 79843
- Area code: 432
- GNIS feature ID: 2034438

Chinati is an unincorporated community in Presidio County, Texas, United States.

It is named after the surrounding Chinati Mountain Range.

The word "chinati" derives from the Apache word ch'íná'itíh, which means gate or mountain pass.

== Education ==
Chinati is zoned to schools in the Presidio Independent School District.
