= Candelaria, Texas =

Unincorporated community in Brewster County, Texas, United States

- Unincorporated community
- Nickname: Cadelaria, Texas
- Location within Texas
- Coordinates: 30°08′19″N 104°41′08″W
- Country: United States
- State: Texas
- County: Presidio
- Elevation: 2,858 ft (871 m)
- Time zone: UTC-6 (Central (CST))
  - Summer (DST): UTC-5 (CDT)
- ZIP codes: 79845
- Area code: 432
- GNIS feature ID: 1377164

Candelaria (/ˌkændɪˈlɛəriə/ KAN-dih-LAIR-ee-ə) is an unincorporated community in Presidio County, Texas, United States, with approximately 75 inhabitants.

== Description ==
The town stands in the Chihuahuan Desert on the north bank of the Rio Grande, just across from the small Mexican town of San Antonio Del Bravo. The two towns were linked by a bridge across the river that enabled the inhabitants of San Antonio to buy groceries and supplies from Candelaria; some sent their children to school there. However, in 2008 the bridge was controversially removed by the U.S. Border Patrol because of concerns that it had become, in the words of Border Patrol chief John Smietana, "a route for terrorists, drug traffickers and illegals."

As of 2019, local United States citizens would still cross illegally due to lack of local service creating some informal reciprocal helps with local Border Patrol agents.

== History ==
It is unclear when Candelaria was founded, but the area was occupied by Native Americans before farmers began to grow crops on the irrigated floodplain of the Rio Grande. It was known initially as Gallina ("chicken" in Spanish) before being renamed as Candelaria. In 1868, an entrepreneur named William Russell came to the area to establish a farm worked by the local people, selling the grain to the US Army at Fort Davis and Fort Stockton. Cotton was also grown locally. With the town's population increasing steadily, it became the seat of one of Presidio County's three school districts in 1893. By 1911 it had grown to two stores, a church and a school, with 307 pupils in the school district and a general population of 1,842, though only a minority of these actually lived in the town.

The remoteness of the area led to concerns about its security during the Mexican Revolution. The US Army responded in 1916 by establishing an army post, Camp Candelaria, that was garrisoned until late 1919. The town's fortunes waned thereafter; with its poor transport links along a 50-mile dirt road to Presidio, its small-scale agriculture could not compete with the industrial farms elsewhere along the Rio Grande. The population fell steadily, from 250 in 1925 to 75 by 1940. By the late 1980s the town had shrunk to a two-room elementary school, a store, a Catholic church, and a cluster of adobe houses.

Candelaria gained its first paved access as late as 1985 when Farm to Market Road 170 to Presidio was surfaced.

== Climate ==
Climate data for Candelaria, Texas (Jun 1, 1940–Jul 22, 2011)
Month	Jan	Feb	Mar	Apr	May	Jun	Jul	Aug	Sep	Oct	Nov	Dec	Year
Record high °F (°C)	86 (30)	92 (33)	99 (37)	105 (41)	110 (43)	115 (46)	114 (46)	111 (44)	109 (43)	103 (39)	93 (34)	86 (30)	115 (46)
Mean daily maximum °F (°C)	66.6 (19.2)	72.4 (22.4)	80.7 (27.1)	89.3 (31.8)	96.6 (35.9)	101.9 (38.8)	100.0 (37.8)	97.7 (36.5)	92.9 (33.8)	85.6 (29.8)	74.6 (23.7)	66.8 (19.3)	85.4 (29.7)
Daily mean °F (°C)	49.0 (9.4)	53.8 (12.1)	60.7 (15.9)	68.7 (20.4)	76.6 (24.8)	83.6 (28.7)	84.1 (28.9)	82.0 (27.8)	77.2 (25.1)	67.7 (19.8)	56.3 (13.5)	49.2 (9.6)	67.4 (19.7)
Mean daily minimum °F (°C)	31.5 (−0.3)	35.2 (1.8)	40.6 (4.8)	48.2 (9.0)	56.5 (13.6)	65.3 (18.5)	68.2 (20.1)	66.4 (19.1)	61.5 (16.4)	49.9 (9.9)	38.1 (3.4)	31.6 (−0.2)	49.4 (9.7)
Record low °F (°C)	9 (−13)	9 (−13)	14 (−10)	21 (−6)	34 (1)	46 (8)	56 (13)	47 (8)	33 (1)	22 (−6)	15 (−9)	6 (−14)	6 (−14)
Average precipitation inches (mm)	0.44 (11)	0.36 (9.1)	0.27 (6.9)	0.36 (9.1)	0.65 (17)	1.48 (38)	2.17 (55)	2.26 (57)	1.99 (51)	1.19 (30)	0.39 (9.9)	0.45 (11)	11.99 (305)
Average snowfall inches (cm)	0.0 (0.0)	0.1 (0.25)	0.0 (0.0)	0.0 (0.0)	0.0 (0.0)	0.0 (0.0)	0.0 (0.0)	0.0 (0.0)	0.0 (0.0)	0.0 (0.0)	0.0 (0.0)	0.0 (0.0)	0.1 (0.25)
Average precipitation days (≥ 0.01 in)	3	2	2	1	3	5	7	8	6	3	2	2	43
Source: Western Regional Climate Center, Desert Research Institute

== Education ==
Candelaria is zoned to schools in the Presidio Independent School District.

== Popular culture ==
Was referenced in the movie The Highwaymen (2019).

== See also ==
- List of unincorporated communities in Texas
