= Infernito Caldera =

Volcanic caldera in West Texas, United States

Coordinates: 30.004°N 104.3676°W

The Infiernito Caldera is a volcanic caldera in the northern part of the Chinati Mountains in West Texas. It is about 12 km (7.5 mi) in diameter and is the oldest caldera of the Chinati Mountain Caldera Complex, having formed about 37 million years ago. The eruption that formed the Infiernito Caldera deposited volcanic ash as far as 20 km (12 mi) away, with most of the ejecta having fallen to the northwest.
