= Pilares, Texas =

- Ghost town
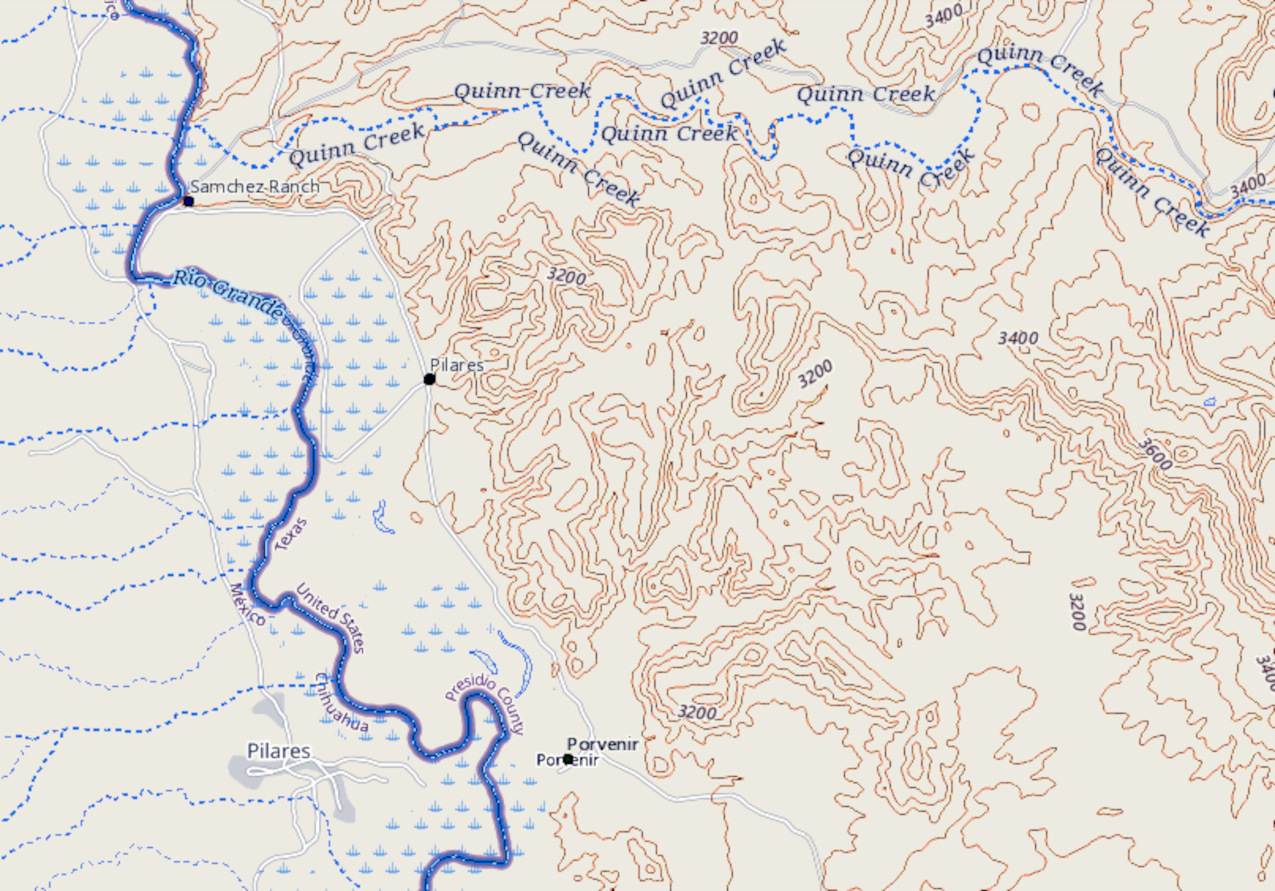

- Location within Texas Pilares, Texas (the United States)
- Coordinates: 30°26′11″N 104°51′07″W
- Country: United States
- State: Texas
- County: Presidio
- Elevation: 3,022 ft (921 m)
- Time zone: UTC-6 (Central (CST))
  - Summer (DST): UTC-5 (CDT)
- ZIP codes: 79854
- Area code: 432
- GNIS feature ID: 1376919

Pilares was a village located in northwest Presidio County, Texas, United States, on the southern boundary of the Sierra Vieja near the Rio Grande. The river village was 1.25 miles (2.01 km) south of the confluence of Quinn Creek and the Rio Grande while bearing 1.5 miles (2.4 km) north of Porvenir, Texas. The uninhabited site is in the Trans-Pecos region of West Texas with a southern panorama of the Chihuahuan Desert and northern Mexico.

== Presidio of Pilares ==
Presidio de Pilares, also known as El Principe, was established along the southern boundaries of the Rio Grande basin in the northern Chihuahua territory of New Spain in 1774. It was at the time part of Nueva Vizcaya, New Spain. The Spanish Presidio provided a defensive wall against the native plains inhabitants during the Mexican Indian Wars in Spanish Texas.

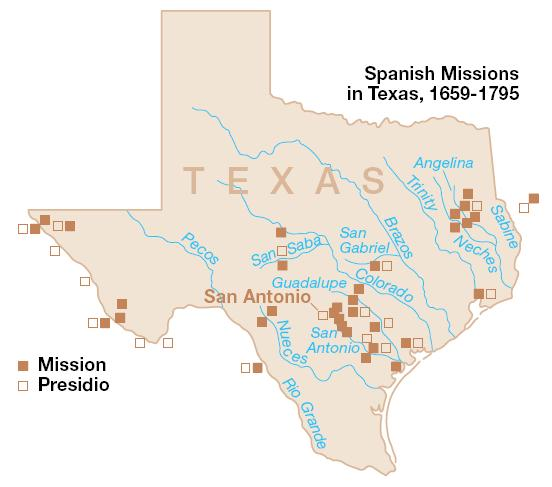
Spanish Missions in Texas, 1659–1795

== History of Rio Grande presidios ==
In the mid-18th century, Charles III of Spain appointed Marquis of Rubí and José de Gálvez to fulfill expeditions and observations of the America frontier presidios in the northern regions of New Spain.

On September 10, 1772, the Spanish Empire issued new regulations for presidios constructed in New Spain near the Rio Grande in the Northern Mexico territories. In 1776, the Viceroyalty of New Spain established Spanish provinces in the Spanish America frontier through the governance of the Provincias Internas serving as a supplemental article to the Bourbon Reforms. The Spanish Presidio coerced the territorial development of New Spain in the Chihuahua territory of the Spanish America colonies while fortifying the Spanish missions in Texas.

== See also ==
- Adams–Onís Treaty
- Comanche Trail
- French colonization of Texas
- List of ghost towns in Texas
- Nueva Vizcaya, New Spain
- United States Camel Corps

== Audiobook Bibliography ==
- History of the Conquest of Mexico public domain audiobook at LibriVox

== Bibliography ==
- Solís, Antonio de (1724). The History of the Conquest of Mexico by the Spaniards. London: T. Woodward and J. Hooke. OCLC 1046514488 – via Internet Archive.
- Solís, Antonio de (1738). The History of the Conquest of Mexico by the Spaniards. Vol. I. London: John Osborn. OCLC 733087530 – via Internet Archive.
- Solís, Antonio de (1738). The History of the Conquest of Mexico by the Spaniards. Vol. II. London: John Osborn. OCLC 733087530 – via Internet Archive.
- Bonnycastle, Richard Henry (1818). Spanish America; A Descriptive, Historical, and Geographical Account of the Dominions of Spain in the Western Hemisphere, Continental & Insular [Account of Spanish America]. Vol. I. London: Longman, Hurst, Rees, Orme, and Brown. OCLC 298513594 – via Internet Archive.
- Bonnycastle, Richard Henry (1818). Spanish America; A Descriptive, Historical, and Geographical Account of the Dominions of Spain in the Western Hemisphere, Continental & Insular [Account of Spanish America]. Vol. II. London: Longman, Hurst, Rees, Orme, and Brown. OCLC 981299968 – via Internet Archive.
- Bonnycastle, Richard Henry (1819). Spanish America; A Descriptive, Historical, and Geographical Account of the Dominions of Spain in the Western Hemisphere, Continental & Insular [Account of Spanish America]. Philadelphia, Pennsylvania: Abraham Small Publisher. OCLC 1157455578 – via Internet Archive.
- Bolton, Herbert Eugene (1915). Texas in the Middle Eighteenth Century: Studies in Spanish Colonial History and Administration. Berkeley, California: University of California Press. OCLC 558670456 – via Internet Archive.
