= Chinati Mountain Caldera Complex =

Volcanic caldera complex in Texas, US

Coordinates: 29.9532°N 104.4776°W

The Chinati Mountains Caldera Complex is a caldera complex located primarily in the Chinati Mountains within the Trans-Pecos Volcanic Field in Texas, United States. It is the largest and most documented volcano within the Trans-Pecos Volcanic Field, consisting mostly of two calderas: the Infernito Caldera and the Chinati Mountain Caldera. The main caldera, Chinati Mountain, erupted about 32–31 million years ago, which resulted in the deposition of the Mitchell Mesa Tuff. The Infernito Caldera antedates the Chinati Mountains Caldera, having deposited the Infernito Tuff about 37 million years ago. It was partially destroyed by the formation of the Chinati Mountains Caldera. The main caldera, on the western side, consists primarily of 100 m (330 ft) thick rhyolite, while the eastern half of the caldera is thinner, around 10 m (33 ft).
