= Study Butte-Terlingua, Texas =

Former census-designated place in Brewster County, Texas, United States

- Former Census-designated place
- Coordinates: 29°19′31″N 103°33′37″W
- Country: United States
- State: Texas
- County: Brewster

Area
  - Total: 15.9 sq mi (41.3 km^{2})
  - Land: 15.9 sq mi (41.3 km^{2})
  - Water: 0 sq mi (0.0 km^{2})

Population (2000)
  - Total: 267
  - Density: 17/sq mi (6.5/km^{2})
- Time zone: UTC-6 (Central (CST))
  - Summer (DST): UTC-5 (CDT)
- FIPS code: 48-70694

Study Butte-Terlingua was a census-designated place (CDP) in Brewster County, Texas, United States. The population was 267 at the 2000 census. For the 2010 census it was split into two CDPs, Study Butte and Terlingua.

== Geography ==
The Study Butte-Terlingua CDP was located at 29°19′31″N 103°33′37″W (29.325224, -103.560383). It had a total area of 15.9 square miles (41 km^{2}), all of it land.

=== Climate ===
This area has a large amount of sunshine year round due to its stable descending air and high pressure. According to the Köppen Climate Classification system, Study Butte-Terlingua has a desert climate, abbreviated "Bwh" on climate maps.

== Demographics ==
Historical population
Census	Pop.	Note	%±
2000	267		—
U.S. Decennial Census; 1850–1900 1910; 1920 1930 1940; 1950 1960 1970; 1980 1990 2000; 2010

Study Butte-Terlingua was first listed as a census designated place in the 2000 U.S. census. It was split into the Study Butte CDP and Terlingua CDP prior to the 2010 U.S. census.

Study Butte-Terlingua CDP, Texas – Racial and ethnic composition Note: the US Census treats Hispanic/Latino as an ethnic category. This table excludes Latinos from the racial categories and assigns them to a separate category. Hispanics/Latinos may be of any race.
Race / Ethnicity (NH = Non-Hispanic)	Pop 2000	% 2000
White alone (NH)	115	43.07%
Black or African American alone (NH)	3	1.12%
Native American or Alaska Native alone (NH)	7	2.62%
Asian alone (NH)	0	0.00%
Pacific Islander alone (NH)	0	0.00%
Other race alone (NH)	0	0.00%
Mixed race or Multiracial (NH)	4	1.50%
Hispanic or Latino (any race)	138	51.69%
Total	267	100.00%

As of the census of 2000, there were 267 people, 104 households, and 60 families residing in the CDP. The population density was 16.7 people per square mile (6.5/km^{2}). There were 122 housing units at an average density of 7.6/sq mi (3.0/km^{2}). The racial makeup of the CDP was 73.41% White, 1.12% African American, 2.62% Native American, 20.97% from other races, and 1.87% from two or more races. Hispanic or Latino of any race were 51.69% of the population.

There were 104 households, out of which 28.8% had children under the age of 18 living with them, 44.2% were married couples living together, 7.7% had a female householder with no husband present, and 42.3% were non-families. 36.5% of all households were made up of individuals, and 5.8% had someone living alone who was 65 years of age or older. The average household size was 2.57 and the average family size was 3.58.

In the CDP, the population was spread out, with 29.2% under the age of 18, 9.7% from 18 to 24, 25.1% from 25 to 44, 25.5% from 45 to 64, and 10.5% who were 65 years of age or older. The median age was 34 years. For every 100 females, there were 130.2 males. For every 100 females age 18 and over, there were 139.2 males.

The median income for a household in the CDP was $35,357, and the median income for a family was $33,750. Males had a median income of $17,366 versus $16,563 for females. The per capita income for the CDP was $15,052. About 10.2% of families and 19.2% of the population were below the poverty line, including 25.7% of those under the age of eighteen and none of those 65 or over.

== Education ==
Study Butte-Terlingua is served by the Terlingua Common School District. Big Bend High School is the local school. Prior to fall 1996 students at the high school level attended Alpine High School in the Alpine Independent School District. Previously the Terlingua CSD had Big Bend High and Terlingua Elementary as separate schools.

== See also ==
- List of census-designated places in Texas
