= The Ballad of Esequiel Hernandez =

The Ballad of Esequiel Hernández
- Directed by: Kieran Fitzgerald
- Written by: Kieran Fitzgerald; Brendan Fitzgerald; Marc Weiss; Shane Slattery-Quintanilla
- Based on: The killing of Esequiel Hernández Jr
- Produced by: Michael Fitzgerald; Brendan Fitzgerald
- Narrated by: Tommy Lee Jones
- Cinematography: Caz Duffy; Kieran Fitzgerald; John Hall
- Edited by: Brendan Fitzgerald; Kieran Fitzgerald; Shane Slattery-Quintanilla
- Music by: Bobby Flores
- Distributed by: PBS
- Release date: April 27, 2007 (Tribeca Film Festival)
- Running time: 90 minutes
- Countries: United States; Mexico
- Languages: English; Spanish

The Ballad of Esequiel Hernández is a 2007 American documentary film that investigates the murky killing of Esequiel Hernández Jr by US Marines. It is written and directed by Kieran Fitzgerald and narrated by Tommy Lee Jones.

== Cast ==
- Tommy Lee Jones - Narrator
- James Blood - self
- David Castaneda - self
- Randall Cater - self
- Mike Coyne - self
- Danny Dominguez - self
- Izdiel Garcia - self
- Michael Gross - self
- Esequiel Hernandez Sr. - self
- Margarito Hernandez - self
- Richard Jerome - self
- Jane Kelly - self
- Terry Kincaid - self
- Amanda Lichtenberg - self
- Enrique Madrid - self
- Christine Manriquez - self
- David Marquez - self
- John McGee - self
- Teresaa Todd - self
- Roy Torrez Jr. - self
- Albert Valadez - self
- Roland Wieler - self
- Jack Zimmermann - self

== Release and reception ==
It won best-documentary awards at the Mexico City Film Festival in 2007, the Santa Fe Film Festival in 2007 and at the El Paso festival in 2008.
