= Presidio Independent School District =

School district in Texas

Presidio Independent School District is a public school district based in Presidio, Texas, United States.

In addition to Presidio, the district also serves the unincorporated areas of Candelaria, Chinati, and Ruidosa.

In 2009, the school district was rated "academically acceptable" by the Texas Education Agency.

== Schools ==
- Presidio High (grades 9-12)
- Lucy Rede Franco Middle (grades 6-8)
- Presidio Elementary (prekindergarten-grade 5)

As of 2019, the Presidio High School rocketry club consistently won competitions against schools from wealthier, urban communities. A Texas Monthly article in 2019 covered the club. A Filipina teacher named Shella Condino established the club after taking a job at Presidio High in 2006; the club began operations in 2008.

== Demographics ==
As of 2019, more than 50% of the students are classified as having English as a second language, and 93% may have school lunches at a reduced or at no cost - the latter is used as a proxy for being economically disadvantaged.
