= The Three Burials of Melquiades Estrada =

2005 film

- Theatrical release poster
- Directed by: Tommy Lee Jones
- Written by: Guillermo Arriaga
- Produced by: Michael Fitzgerald; Luc Besson; Pierre-Ange Le Pogam; Tommy Lee Jones
- Starring: Tommy Lee Jones; Barry Pepper; Julio Cesar Cedillo; Dwight Yoakam; January Jones; Melissa Leo
- Cinematography: Chris Menges
- Edited by: Roberto Silvi
- Music by: Marco Beltrami
- Production companies: EuropaCorp; Javelina Film Company
- Distributed by: Sony Pictures Classics
- Release dates: May 20, 2005 (Cannes); September 11, 2005 (TIFF); November 23, 2005 (France); February 3, 2006 (US)
- Running time: 121 minutes
- Countries: France; United States; Mexico
- Languages: English; Spanish
- Budget: $15 million
- Box office: $13.5 million

The Three Burials of Melquiades Estrada (also known as Three Burials) is a 2005 neo-Western film directed by and starring Tommy Lee Jones (in his directorial debut) and written by Guillermo Arriaga. It also stars Barry Pepper, Julio Cedillo, Dwight Yoakam, January Jones and Melissa Leo.

The film was inspired by the real-life killing in Texas of a teenager, Esequiel Hernandez Jr, by United States Marines during a military operation near the United States–Mexico border as well as the novel As I Lay Dying by William Faulkner, which contains the same plot premise and challenges encountered in the film.

The film has many flashbacks with the same event shown from different perspectives.

== Plot ==
Melquiades Estrada, a Mexican illegal immigrant working in Texas as a cowboy, shoots at a coyote which is menacing his small flock of goats. A nearby United States Border Patrol officer, Mike Norton, thinks he is being attacked and shoots, killing Melquiades. Norton buries Melquiades and does not report anything about the event. Melquiades' body is found and is reburied in a local cemetery by the sheriff's office. Evidence that he may have been killed by Border Patrol is ignored by the local sheriff, Frank Belmont.

Pete Perkins, a rancher and Melquiades' best friend, finds out from a waitress, Rachel, that the killer was Norton. Perkins had promised Melquiades that he would bury him in his home town of Jiménez, if he died in Texas.

Perkins ties up Norton's wife, Lou Ann, kidnaps him and forces him to dig up Melquiades' body. Then he begins a journey on horseback into Mexico with the body tied to a mule and his captive Norton in tow. Sheriff Belmont realizes that Perkins has kidnapped Norton, and so police officers and the Border Patrol begin to search for them. Belmont sees them heading towards the Mexico border, but as he takes aim at Perkins, he can't bring himself to shoot, and he returns to town, leaving the pursuit to the Border Patrol.

On their way across the harsh countryside, the pair experience a series of surrealistic encounters. They spend an afternoon with an elderly blind American, who listens to Mexican radio for company. The man asks to be shot since there is no one left to take care of him. He does not want to commit suicide because, he argues, doing so would offend God. Perkins refuses as that too would offend God. Norton attempts to escape and is bitten by a rattlesnake. They are eventually discovered by a group of illegal immigrants crossing into Texas. Perkins gives one of them a horse as barter payment for guiding them across the river to a herbal healer. She turns out to be a woman whose nose Norton had broken when he punched her in the face during an arrest. At Perkins's request, she saves Norton's life and then breaks Norton's nose with a coffee pot.

The duo encounter a group of Mexican cowboys watching American soap operas on a television hooked up to their pickup truck. The program is the same episode that was airing when Norton had sex with his wife in their trailer earlier in the movie. Norton is visibly shaken and is given half a bottle of liquor by one of the cowboys. We see Norton's wife as she decides to leave the border town to return to her home town of Cincinnati. She has grown distant from her husband and seems unconcerned about his kidnapping, stating that he is "beyond redemption".

Perkins and Norton arrive at a town that is near the location of Jiménez, but no one in the town has heard of it. Perkins has some luck in locating a woman Melquiades described as his wife but, when Perkins confronts her, she states that she has never heard of Melquiades Estrada and lives in town with her husband and children. She does visibly react to a photograph Perkins shows her of Melquiades standing behind her and her children, stating that she does "...not want to get in trouble with her husband". Perkins continues onward searching for Melquiades' descriptions of a place "filled with beauty". Eventually they come upon a ruined house which Perkins feels was the one Melquiades had mentioned. Perkins and Norton repair the walls, construct a new roof and bury Melquiades for the third and final time.

Perkins then demands that Norton beg forgiveness for the killing, but Norton responds with obstinacy. Perkins fires several shots from his pistol around Norton until he complies, asking for forgiveness from Melquiades. Perkins accepts his hysterical grief and in passing calls him "son". Leaving Norton the second horse, Perkins rides away as Norton calls out and asks him if he will be okay.

== Cast ==
- Tommy Lee Jones as Pete Perkins
- Barry Pepper as Mike Norton
- Julio Cesar Cedillo as Melquiades Estrada
- Dwight Yoakam as Belmont
- January Jones as Lou Ann Norton
- Melissa Leo as Rachel
- Levon Helm as the old man with radio
- Mel Rodriguez as Captain Gomez
- Cecilia Suárez as Rosa
- Ignacio Guadalupe as Lucio
- Vanessa Bauche as Mariana
- Irineo Álvarez as Manuel
- Guillermo Arriaga as Juan
- Rodger Boyce as a salesman
- Gustavo Sánchez Parra as Tomas
- Barry Tubb as A. L.

== Production ==
The film was an international co-production film between France, the United States and Mexico. It is based on the 1997 wrongful shooting of 18-year-old Esequiel Hernandez by a US marine. Filming locations in Texas included Big Bend National Park, Big Bend Ranch State Park, Lajitas, Midland, Monahans, Odessa, Van Horn, and Redford. The film was the directorial debut of Tommy Lee Jones. The film was written by Guillermo Arriaga. Describing herself as "sort of shameless," Melissa Leo still hesitated before getting naked.

== Reception ==
On the review aggregator website Rotten Tomatoes, 84% of 148 critics' reviews are positive, with an average rating of 7.6/10. The website's consensus reads: "Tommy Lee Jones' directorial debut is both a potent western and a powerful morality tale." Metacritic, which uses a weighted average, assigned the film a score of 77 out of 100, based on 35 critics, indicating "generally favorable" reviews.

The Mary Sue's Sarah Fimm called it "a painfully necessary film about state corruption and violence, and the bravery of those willing to stand against it."

=== Accolades ===
Cannes Film Festival

- Win: Best Actor – Tommy Lee Jones
- Win: Best Screenplay – Guillermo Arriaga
- Nominated: Golden Palm – Tommy Lee Jones

Belgian Syndicate of Cinema Critics

- Nominated: Grand Prix

Independent Spirit Awards

- Nominated: Best Film
- Nominated: Best Supporting Male – Barry Pepper
- Nominated: Best Screenplay – Guillermo Arriaga
- Nominated: Best Cinematography – Chris Menges

Film Fest Gent

- Win: Grand Prix for Best Film (2005)
