= Fort Leaton State Historic Site =

- Fort Leaton
- Texas State Historic Site
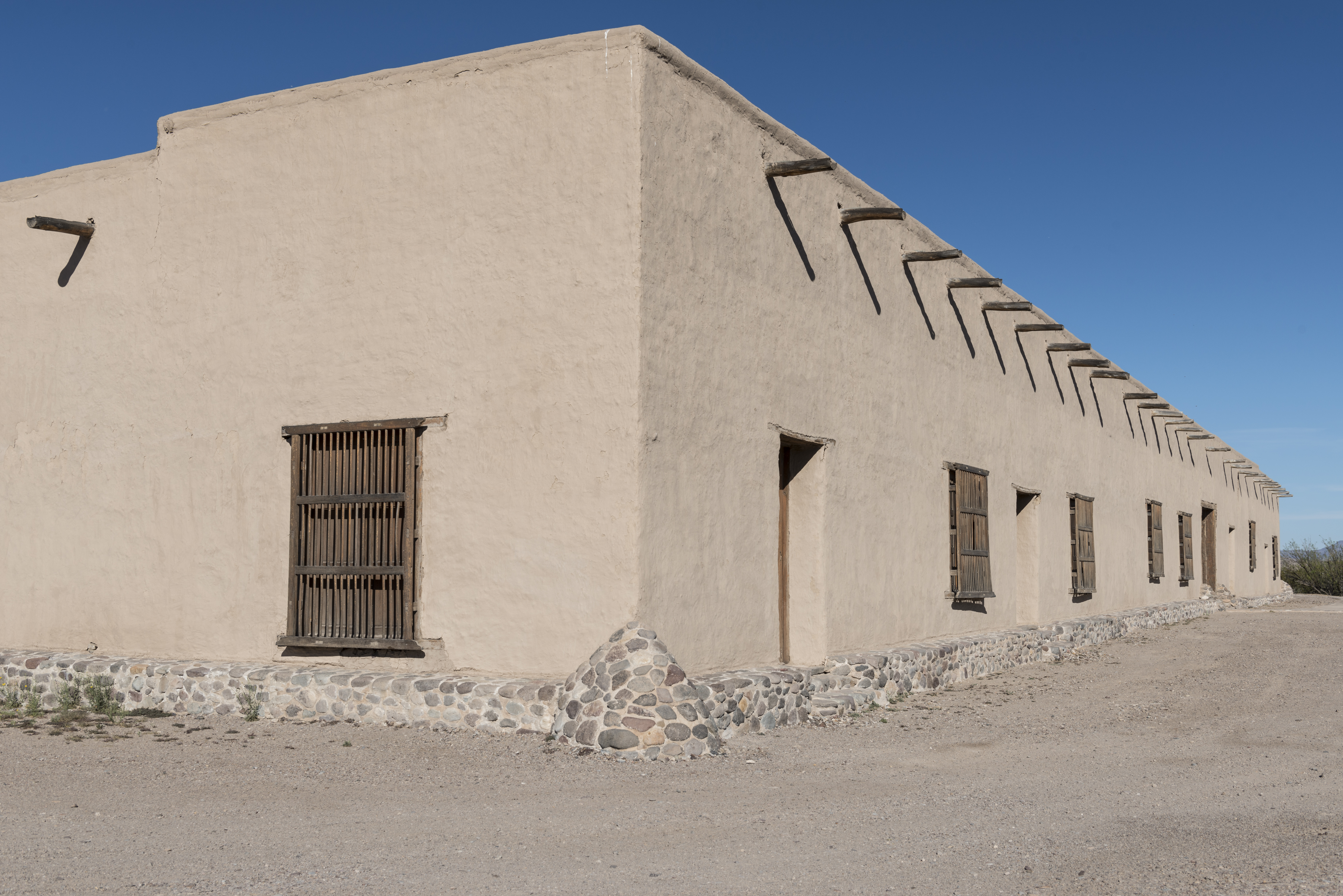
- Fort Leaton

- Location within Texas Location within the United States
- Location: Presidio County, Texas
- Nearest city: Presidio, Texas
- Coordinates: 29°32′33″N 104°19′35″W
- Area: 23.4 acres (9.5 ha)
- Built: 1848
- Built by: Benjamin Leaton
- Visitation: 8,277 (2025)
- Website: Official site

Significant dates
- Added to NRHP: June 18, 1973 refnum =73001972
- Designated TSHS: December 8, 1967

The Fort Leaton State Historic Site is a 23.5 acres (9.5 ha) historic site in Presidio County, Texas, United States. The original adobe structure was a private residence dating back to the early 19th century. It was purchased in 1848 by Benjamin Leaton, who adapted it as a fortress. Fort Leaton was the Presidio County original seat of government. Through murders, financial difficulties and abandonment, the structure changed hands numerous times. In 1967, it was deeded to the state of Texas and opened to the public in 1978 as a Texas State Historic Site under management by the Texas Parks and Wildlife Department. It was added to the National Register of Historic Places listings in Presidio County, Texas on June 18, 1973.

== History ==
Fort Leaton is believed to have been built as an adobe residence in the 1830s by Juan Bustillos. In 1848, it was acquired by Benjamin Leaton, who lived in the structure and also used it as his trading post and fortress.

Benjamin Leaton was a trader, freight hauler along the Chihuahua Trail, and a bounty hunter paid by various local governments in Mexico for each scalp taken from an indigenous person. He also traded munitions to the Apache and Comanche for any stolen cattle they brought him. When Presidio County was established in 1850, Fort Leaton was its first seat of government. Leaton died in 1851, and his widow married Edward Hall who continued operating the freight business from the fort. Hall became financially indebted to Leaton's scalp hunting partner John Burgess. Hall defaulted on his debt to Burgess in 1864, and was murdered. Burgess took over the fort, and was in turn murdered by Leaton's son in 1875. The Burgess family remained in the fort until they abandoned it in 1926. The fort was purchased by Marfa State Bank and a private citizen in the 1930s and donated to Presidio County. An attempt at restoration was begun, but adequate financing never materialized. The site was then purchased by a private citizen and donated to the state of Texas. In 1968, the site was designated Fort Leaton State Historic Site. It opened to the public in 1978.

Fort Leaton was added to the National Register of Historic Places listings in Presidio County, Texas on June 18, 1973.

== Facilities ==
Fort Leaton State Historic Site is on Farm to Market Road 170, 5 miles (8.0 km) southeast of Presidio, Texas.

The site contains historic ruins, nature trails, and exhibits. There is a picnic area and public restrooms. The Texas State Park Store gift shop is located on the grounds.

The Barton Warnock Visitor Center serves as the visitor center for both Ft. Leaton State Historic Site and Big Bend Ranch State Park.

Wireless Internet Access (Wi-Fi) is available in some areas of this site.

== Hours, admission ==
Fort Leaton is open 8 a.m. to 4:30 p.m., 7 days a week, but closed on Christmas Day.

Entrance fee applies. Special event rental fees by prior arrangement. Guided tours are available for an additional fee. Group tours need to be coordinated in advance with the Park.

== See also ==
- Museums in West Texas
- National Register of Historic Places listings in Presidio County, Texas
- List of Texas state parks
