= Presidio County, Texas =

County in Texas, United States

- County
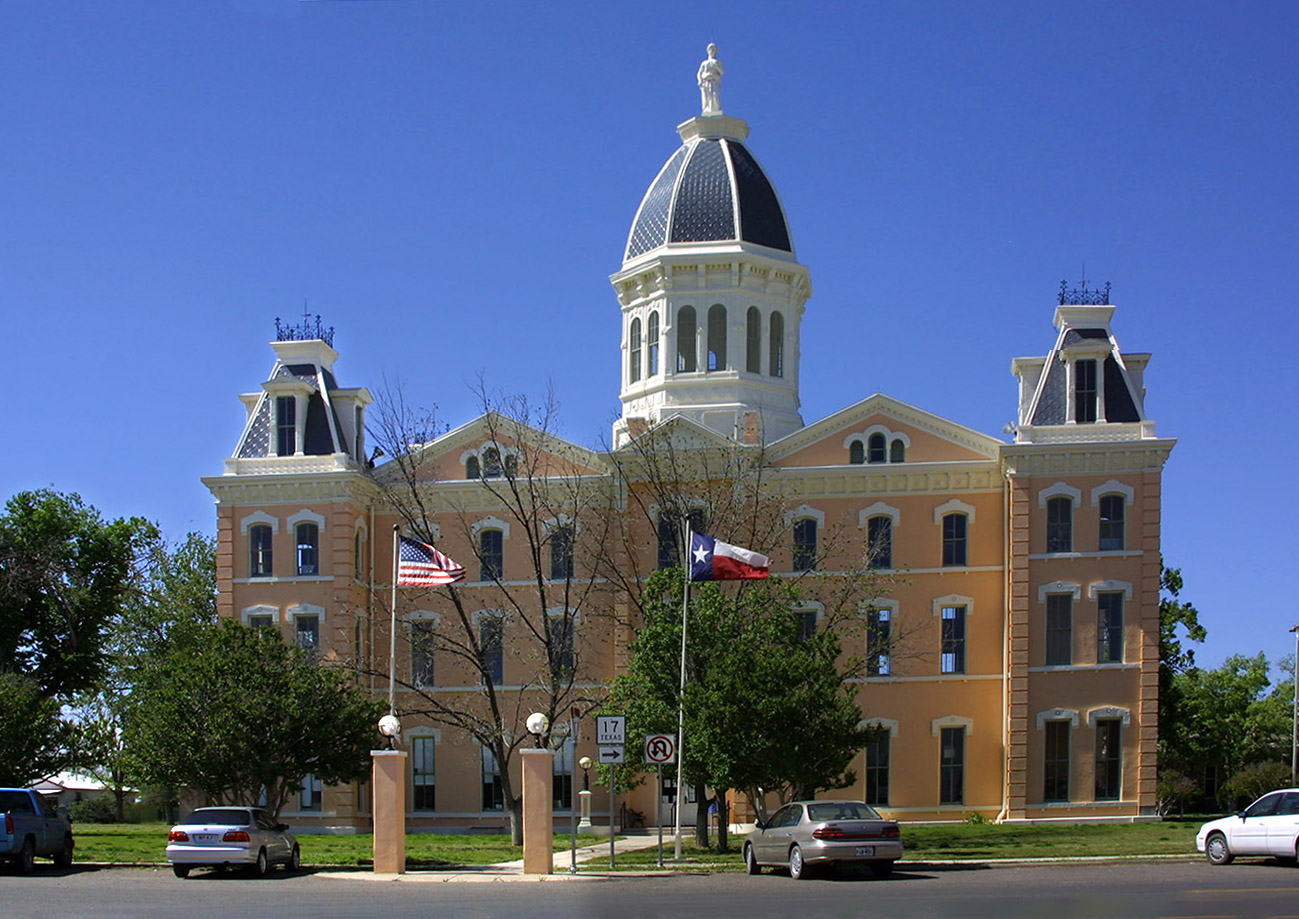
- Presidio County Courthouse in Marfa

- Location within the U.S. state of Texas
- Coordinates: 30°00′N 104°14′W
- Country: United States
- State: Texas
- Founded: 1850
- Named for: Presidio del Norte, an eighteenth-century fort
- Seat: Marfa
- Largest city: Presidio

Area
  - Total: 3,856 sq mi (9,990 km^{2})
  - Land: 3,855 sq mi (9,980 km^{2})
  - Water: 0.7 sq mi (1.8 km^{2}) 0.02%

Population (2020)
  - Total: 6,131
  - Estimate (2025): 5,433 ▼
  - Density: 2/sq mi (0.77/km^{2})
- Congressional district: 23rd
- Website: www.co.presidio.tx.us

Presidio County is a county located in the U.S. state of Texas. As of the 2020 census, its population was 6,131. Its county seat is Marfa. The county was created in 1850 and later organized in 1875. Presidio County (K-5 in Texas topological index of counties) is in the Trans-Pecos region of West Texas and is named for the border settlement of Presidio del Norte (now Ojinaga, Mexico). It is on the Rio Grande, which forms the Mexican border.

== History ==
=== Native Americans ===
Paleo-Indians (hunter-gatherers) existed thousands of years ago on the Trans-Pecos, and often did not adapt to culture clashes, European diseases, and colonization. The Masames tribe was exterminated by the Tobosos circa 1652. The Nonojes suffered from clashes with the Spanish and merged with the Tobosos. The Spanish made slave raids to the La Junta de los Ríos, committing cruelties against the native population. The Suma-Jumano tribe sought to align themselves with the Spanish for survival. The tribe later merged with the Apache people. Foraging peoples who did not survive the 18th century include the Chisos, Mansos, Jumanos, Conchos, Julimes, Cibolos, Tobosos, Sumas, Cholomes, Caguates, Nonojes, Cocoyames, and Acoclames.

=== Early explorations and settlements ===
The entrada of Juan Domínguez de Mendoza and Father Nicolás López in 1683–84 set out from El Paso to La Junta, where they established seven missions at seven pueblos. In 1683, Father López celebrated the first Christmas Mass in Texas at La Junta.

In 1832, José Ygnacio Ronquillo was issued a conditional land grant and established the county's first white settlement on Cibolo Creek. Military obligations forced him to abandon the settlement, and he then sold the land.

The Chihuahua Trail connecting Mexico's state of Chihuahua with Santa Fe, New Mexico, opened in 1839.

By 1848, Ben Leaton built Fort Leaton, sometimes called the largest adobe structure in Texas, on the river as his home, trading post, and private bastion. Leaton died in debt in 1851, with the fort passing to the holder of the mortgage, John Burgess. In 1934, T. C. Mitchell and the Marfa State Bank acquired the old structure and donated it to the county as a historic site. The park was opened to the public in 1978.

Milton Faver became the county's first cattle baron. In 1857, he moved his family to Chinati Mountains in the county. Milton Faver bought small tracts of land around three springs-Cibolo, Cienega, and La Morita-and established cattle ranches. He built Fort Cienega and Fort Cibolo.

=== County established and growth ===
Presidio County was established from Bexar County on January 3, 1850. Fort Leaton became the county seat. The county was organized in 1875 as the largest county in the United States, with 12,000 square miles (31,000 km^{2}). Fort Davis was named the county seat. The boundaries and seat of Presidio County were changed in the 1880s. Marfa was established in 1883, and the county seat was moved there from Fort Davis in 1885.

In 1854, the army built Fort Davis in northern Presidio County. Fort Davis closed during the Civil War and reopened in 1867. The black population increased to 489 when Buffalo Soldiers were stationed at Fort Davis.

John W. Spencer, a local rancher and trader, found a silver deposit in the Chinati Mountains in 1880 that resulted in the opening of Presidio Mine and the beginning of the company town of Shafter. From 1883 until 1942, the mine produced over 32.6 million ounces of silver.

The railroad reached Presidio County in 1882, when the Galveston, Harrisburg and San Antonio Railway laid tracks through its northeastern corner.

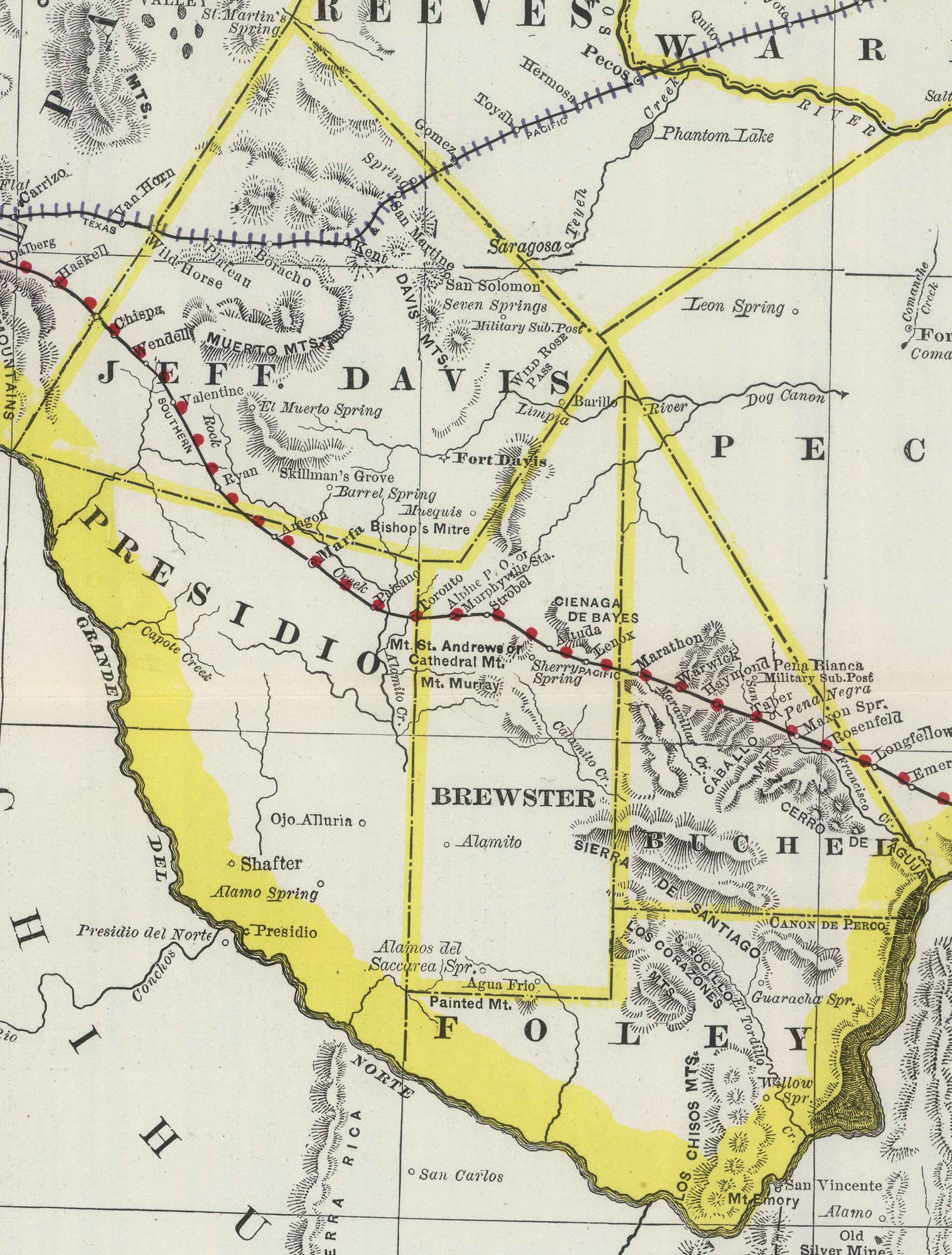
Map of Presidio County, Texas, and the counties of Brewster, Buchel, Foley, and Jeff Davis created from Presidio in 1887: Buchel and Foley were abolished and joined to Brewster in 1897.

W. F. Mitchell built the first barbed wire fence in the county at Antelope Springs in 1888. The widespread use of barbed wire resulted in the refinement of cattle breeds, improvement of ranges, and innovative use of water supplies.

Windmills, water wells, and earthen tanks were introduced on Presidio County ranches in the late 1880s.

Elephant Butte Dam was built in 1910 on the Rio Grande, creating a large, reliable irrigation source for the county.

The growth of Presidio County's population in the 1910s reflected the impact of the Mexican Revolution on border life. Refugees migrated to the county from Chihuahua as the fighting moved into northern Mexico. The United States Army established several posts in the county. Marfa became the headquarters for the Big Bend Military District, and in 1917, the Army established Camp Marfa, later called Fort D. A. Russell, at Marfa to protect the border. As Presidio County entered the 1930s the people faced a drought and a population decline. Low silver prices closed Presidio Mine at Shafter. Economic recovery began by 1936. During World War II, Presidio County enjoyed economic prosperity as the home for two military installations-Fort Russell and Marfa Army Airfield.

In late January 1918, during a period of tension between the U.S. and Mexico, Texas Rangers and citizens of the village of Porvenir murdered 15 local Hispanic residents.

The economy of the county in 1982 was based primarily on agriculture, with 83% of the land in farms and ranches.

=== Marfa Lights ===
Wagon trains on the Chihuahua Trail reported seeing unexplained lights in the mid-19th century. The first recorded incident of the Marfa Lights was in 1883 when Robert Reed Ellison and cowhands camped at Mitchell Flats. They thought the lights might have been Apaches, but later found no evidence of an Apache encampment. Since that time, the lights continue to appear between Marfa and Paisano Pass. Speculation and fascination spark imaginations about the source. Some say they are caused by car headlights; some say they are extraterrestrial visitors. One theory is that the lights are similar to a mirage caused by atmospheric conditions. Marfa celebrates with a Mystery Lights Festival every Labor Day.

== Geography ==
According to the U.S. Census Bureau, the county has a total area of 3,856 square miles (9,990 km^{2}), of which 3,855 square miles (9,980 km^{2}) are land and 0.7 sq mi (1.8 km^{2}) (0.02%) is covered by water. It is the fourth-largest county in Texas by area.

Presidio County is triangular in shape and is bounded on the east by Brewster County, on the north by Jeff Davis County, and on the south and west for 135 miles (217 km) by the Rio Grande and Mexico. Marfa, the county seat, is 190 miles (306 km) southeast of El Paso and 150 miles (241 km) southwest of Odessa. The center of the county lies at 30°30' north latitude and 104°15' west longitude.

Geographically, Presidio County comprises 3,857 square miles (9,990 km^{2}) of contrasting topography, geology, and vegetation. In the north and west, clay and sandy loam cover the rolling plains known as the Marfa Plateau and the Highland Country, providing good ranges of grama grasses for the widely acclaimed Highland Herefords. In the central, far western, and southeastern areas of the county, some of the highest mountain ranges in Texas are found. These peaks are formed of volcanic rock and covered with loose surface rubble. They support desert shrubs and cacti and dominate a landscape of rugged canyons and numerous springs. The spring-fed Capote Falls, with a drop of 175 feet (53 m), the highest in Texas, is located in western Presidio County. In the southern and western parts of the county, the volcanic cliffs of the Candelaria Rimrock (also called the Sierra Vieja) rise perpendicular and run parallel to the river, separating the highland prairies from the desert floor hundreds of feet below them. The gravel pediment, which allows only the growth of desert shrubs and cacti, extends from the Rimrock to the flood plain of the river.

Along the Rio Grande, irrigation allows the farming of vegetables, grains, and cotton. No permanent streams exist in the county, although many arroyos become raging torrents during heavy rainfalls. Major arroyos are Alamito Creek, Cibolo Creek, Capote Creek, and Pinto Canyon. San Esteban Dam was built across Alamito Creek about 10 miles (16 km) south of Marfa and on the site of a historic spring-fed tinaja in 1911 as an irrigation and land-promotion project. The reservoir lake is a source of water for irrigation. Tinaja refers to a depression in the land formed by water flow from a spring or under a waterfall. In this arid county, it is due to the spring. Capote Falls, which is formed by Capote Creek, is the tallest waterfall in the state.

Altitudes in the county vary from 2,518 to 7,728 feet (767 to 2,355 m) above sea level. Temperatures, moderated by the mountains, vary from 33 °F (1 °C) in January to 100 °F (38 °C) in July. Average rainfall is 12 inches (300 mm) per year, mainly in June, July, and August. The growing season extends for 238 days.

Natural resources under production in 1982 were perlite, crushed rhyolite, sand, and gravel. Silver mining contributed greatly to the economy of the county from the 1880s to the 1940s. Presidio County has no oil or gas production.

=== Major highways ===
- U.S. Highway 67
- U.S. Highway 90
- State Highway 17
- Spur 203

=== Adjacent counties and municipios ===
Presidio County's unusual shape has it facing more of Mexico than the rest of the United States. The county is bounded on the east by Brewster County, on the north by Jeff Davis County, and on the south and west for 135 miles (217 km) by the Rio Grande and Mexico. Along the international border, the county faces the Manuel Benavides and Ojinaga Districts of the state of Chihuahua, Mexico, on the south side, and the municipality of Guadalupe of the State of Chihuahua, Mexico, on its southwestern side.

- Hudspeth County (northwest)
- Jeff Davis County (north)
- Brewster County (east)
- Manuel Benavides Municipality, Chihuahua, Mexico (south)
- Ojinaga Municipality, Chihuahua, Mexico (southwest)
- Guadalupe Municipality, Chihuahua, Mexico (west)

== Climate ==
More than half of Presidio County, 54.6%, experiences a hot arid desert climate (Köppen BWh). The remainder has a semiarid steppe climate with 34.7% classified as a cold steppe climate (Köppen BSk) and 10.8% as a hot steppe climate (Köppen BSh). Temperatures are coolest and rainfall most abundant in the higher elevations of the Davis and Chinati Mountains. By contrast, the lowlands along the Rio Grande along the southern and western areas of the county are dry, with often extreme summer daytime heat and where winter snowfall is unusual. Throughout the county, May through October marks the rainy season, while the remainder of the year is predominantly dry.

Candelaria

- Coordinates: 30.13833°N 104.68222°W
- Elevation: 2,877 feet (877 m)

Climate data for Candelaria, Texas (June 1, 1940–July 22, 2011)
Month	Jan	Feb	Mar	Apr	May	Jun	Jul	Aug	Sep	Oct	Nov	Dec	Year
Mean daily maximum °F (°C)	66.6 (19.2)	72.4 (22.4)	80.7 (27.1)	89.3 (31.8)	96.6 (35.9)	101.9 (38.8)	100.0 (37.8)	97.7 (36.5)	92.9 (33.8)	85.6 (29.8)	74.6 (23.7)	66.8 (19.3)	85.4 (29.7)
Mean daily minimum °F (°C)	31.5 (−0.3)	35.2 (1.8)	40.6 (4.8)	48.2 (9.0)	56.5 (13.6)	65.3 (18.5)	68.2 (20.1)	66.4 (19.1)	61.5 (16.4)	49.9 (9.9)	38.1 (3.4)	31.6 (−0.2)	49.4 (9.7)
Average precipitation inches (mm)	0.44 (11)	0.36 (9.1)	0.27 (6.9)	0.36 (9.1)	0.65 (17)	1.48 (38)	2.17 (55)	2.26 (57)	1.99 (51)	1.19 (30)	0.39 (9.9)	0.45 (11)	12.01 (305)
Source: Western Regional Climate Center, Desert Research Institute

Marfa

- Coordinates: 30.31250°N 104.07222°W
- Elevation: 4,790 feet (1,460 m)

Climate data for Marfa #2, Texas (December 1, 1958–July 31, 2009)
Month	Jan	Feb	Mar	Apr	May	Jun	Jul	Aug	Sep	Oct	Nov	Dec	Year
Mean daily maximum °F (°C)	60.2 (15.7)	63.9 (17.7)	71.2 (21.8)	78.8 (26.0)	85.8 (29.9)	91.2 (32.9)	89.6 (32.0)	87.5 (30.8)	83.6 (28.7)	77.3 (25.2)	67.6 (19.8)	60.8 (16.0)	76.5 (24.7)
Mean daily minimum °F (°C)	25.7 (−3.5)	28.1 (−2.2)	33.5 (0.8)	41.4 (5.2)	50.1 (10.1)	57.6 (14.2)	60.2 (15.7)	59.1 (15.1)	54.0 (12.2)	44.1 (6.7)	33.4 (0.8)	26.6 (−3.0)	42.8 (6.0)
Average precipitation inches (mm)	0.42 (11)	0.47 (12)	0.31 (7.9)	0.59 (15)	1.17 (30)	1.78 (45)	2.73 (69)	2.89 (73)	2.57 (65)	1.39 (35)	0.58 (15)	0.50 (13)	15.4 (390.9)
Source: Western Regional Climate Center, Desert Research Institute

Miller Ranch

Miller Ranch is located in the far north of the county, 10 miles from Valentine in adjoining Jeff Davis County.

- Coordinates: 30.5525°N 104.64667°W
- Elevation: 4,394 feet (1,339 m)

Climate data for Valentine 10 WSW, Texas (March 1, 1897–March 31, 2013)
Month	Jan	Feb	Mar	Apr	May	Jun	Jul	Aug	Sep	Oct	Nov	Dec	Year
Mean daily maximum °F (°C)	63.3 (17.4)	64.0 (17.8)	72.5 (22.5)	78.0 (25.6)	87.7 (30.9)	93.3 (34.1)	92.2 (33.4)	91.1 (32.8)	87.1 (30.6)	79.8 (26.6)	72.1 (22.3)	63.9 (17.7)	78.8 (26.0)
Mean daily minimum °F (°C)	29.2 (−1.6)	29.6 (−1.3)	35.7 (2.1)	42.9 (6.1)	52.1 (11.2)	62.6 (17.0)	64.9 (18.3)	62.2 (16.8)	56.4 (13.6)	46.7 (8.2)	35.3 (1.8)	25.2 (−3.8)	45.2 (7.4)
Average precipitation inches (mm)	0.57 (14)	0.47 (12)	0.34 (8.6)	0.36 (9.1)	0.83 (21)	1.72 (44)	2.38 (60)	2.43 (62)	2.42 (61)	1.19 (30)	0.51 (13)	0.56 (14)	13.78 (348.7)
Source: Western Regional Climate Center, Desert Research Institute

Presidio

- Coordinates: 29.57111°N 104.37139°W
- Elevation: 2,610 feet (796 m)

Climate data for Presidio, Texas (October 1, 1927–March 6, 2013)
Month	Jan	Feb	Mar	Apr	May	Jun	Jul	Aug	Sep	Oct	Nov	Dec	Year
Mean daily maximum °F (°C)	67.3 (19.6)	73.9 (23.3)	81.9 (27.7)	90.2 (32.3)	97.4 (36.3)	102.6 (39.2)	101.1 (38.4)	99.8 (37.7)	94.9 (34.9)	87.2 (30.7)	75.7 (24.3)	67.4 (19.7)	86.6 (30.3)
Mean daily minimum °F (°C)	33.4 (0.8)	38.3 (3.5)	44.6 (7.0)	53.2 (11.8)	62.4 (16.9)	71.2 (21.8)	73.0 (22.8)	71.8 (22.1)	66.5 (19.2)	55.5 (13.1)	41.9 (5.5)	34.4 (1.3)	53.9 (12.2)
Average precipitation inches (mm)	0.41 (10)	0.33 (8.4)	0.18 (4.6)	0.31 (7.9)	0.64 (16)	1.22 (31)	1.54 (39)	1.43 (36)	1.48 (38)	0.91 (23)	0.38 (9.7)	0.42 (11)	9.25 (234.6)
Source: Western Regional Climate Center, Desert Research Institute

== Demographics ==
Historical population
Census	Pop.	Note	%±
1860	580		—
1870	1,636		182.1%
1880	2,873		75.6%
1890	1,698		−40.9%
1900	3,676		116.5%
1910	5,218		41.9%
1920	12,202		133.8%
1930	10,154		−16.8%
1940	10,925		7.6%
1950	7,354		−32.7%
1960	5,460		−25.8%
1970	4,842		−11.3%
1980	5,188		7.1%
1990	6,637		27.9%
2000	7,304		10.0%
2010	7,818		7.0%
2020	6,131		−21.6%
2025 (est.)	5,433	▼	−11.4%
U.S. Decennial Census; 1850–2010 2010–2020 2020

=== Racial and ethnic composition ===
Presidio County, Texas – Racial and ethnic composition Note: the US Census treats Hispanic/Latino as an ethnic category. This table excludes Latinos from the racial categories and assigns them to a separate category. Hispanics/Latinos may be of any race.
Race / Ethnicity (NH = Non-Hispanic)	Pop 1980	Pop 1990	Pop 2000	Pop 2010	Pop 2020	% 1980	% 1990	% 2000	% 2010	% 2020
White alone (NH)	1,188	1,197	1,079	1,136	961	22.90%	18.04%	14.77%	14.53%	15.67%
Black or African American alone (NH)	1	2	10	27	25	0.02%	0.03%	0.14%	0.35%	0.41%
Native American or Alaska Native alone (NH)	8	11	13	22	16	0.15%	0.17%	0.18%	0.28%	0.26%
Asian alone (NH)	1	10	6	75	85	0.02%	0.15%	0.08%	0.96%	1.39%
Native Hawaiian or Pacific Islander alone (NH)	x	x	1	0	0	x	x	0.01%	0.00%	0.00%
Other race alone (NH)	1	0	7	3	9	0.02%	0.00%	0.10%	0.04%	0.15%
Multiracial (NH)	x	x	26	34	44	x	x	0.36%	0.43%	0.72%
Hispanic or Latino (any race)	3,989	5,417	6,162	6,521	4,991	76.89%	81.62%	84.36%	83.41%	81.41%
Total	5,188	6,637	7,304	7,818	6,131	100.00%	100.00%	100.00%	100.00%	100.00%

=== 2020 census ===
As of the 2020 census, the county had a population of 6,131. The median age was 42.3 years; 23.8% of the residents were under 18 and 20.1% were 65 or older. The female/male ratio was 1:0.948 overall and 1:0.913 for those 18 and over.

The racial makeup of the county was 38.0% White, 0.4% Black or African American, 0.8% American Indian and Alaska Native, 1.4% Asian, <0.1% Native Hawaiian and Pacific Islander, 19.4% from some other race, and 39.9% from two or more races. Hispanic or Latino residents of any race comprised 81.4% of the population.

Less than 0.1% of residents lived in urban areas, while almost all lived in rural areas.

Of the 2,435 households in the county, 30.6% had children under 18 living in them, 47.3% were married-couple households, 18.7% were households with a male householder and no spouse or partner present, and 29.9% were households with a female householder and no spouse or partner present. About 30.0% of all households were made up of individuals, and 13.7% had someone living alone who was 65 or older.

The county had 3,194 housing units, of which 23.8% were vacant. Among occupied housing units, 68.3% were owner-occupied and 31.7% were renter-occupied. The homeowner vacancy rate was 2.8% and the rental vacancy rate was 12.5%.

=== 2010 census ===
As of the 2010 United States census, 7,818 people resided in the county. About 85.9% were White, 1.0% Asian, 0.7% Native American, 0.6% Black or African American, 9.9% of some other race, and 1.9% of two or more races; 83.4% were Hispanic or Latino (of any race).

=== 2000 census ===
As of the 2000 census, 7,304 people, 2,530 households, and 1,864 families resided in the county. The population density was 2 people per square mile (0.77 people/km^{2}). The 3,299 housing units averaged 1 units per square mile (0.39/km^{2}). The racial makeup of the county was 84.95% White, 0.27% Black or African American, 0.27% Native American, 0.08% Asian, 13.48% from other races, and 0.93% from two or more races. About 84.36% of the population was Hispanic or Latino of any race.

Of the 2,530 households, 40.4% had children under 18 living with them, 56.5% were married couples living together, 13.6% had a female householder with no husband present, and 26.3% were not families. Around 24.2% of all households were made up of individuals, and 13.2% had someone living alone who was 65 older. The average household size was 2.85 and the average family size was 3.43.

In the county, the population was distributed as 32.7% under 18, 8.3% from 18 to 24, 24.9% from 25 to 44, 20.2% from 45 to 64, and 13.9% who were 65 or older. The median age was 33 years. For every 100 females there were 94.3 males. For every 100 females age 18 and over, there were 92.0 males.

The median income in the county for a household was $19,860 and for a family was $22,314. Males had a median income of $23,218 versus $16,208 for females. The per capita income for the county was $9,558. About 32.5% of families and 36.4% of the population were below the poverty line, including 43.4% of those under 18 and 44.1% of those 65 or over. The county's per capita income makes it one of the poorest counties in the United States.

== Politics ==
Presidio County is reliably Democratic, Ronald Reagan having been the last Republican candidate to get even forty percent of its vote. In 2008 United States presidential election, Barack Obama received 71.3% of the county's vote while John McCain received 28.0%. In the 2012 United States presidential election Barack Obama received 70.56% of the county's vote and Mitt Romney received 27.74%. In the 2016 United States presidential election, Hillary Clinton received 66.0% of the county's vote while Donald Trump received 29.5%. In the 2020 United States presidential election, Joe Biden received 66.0% of the county's vote while Donald Trump received 32.5%.

Despite a hard rightward shift in heavily Hispanic South Texas in 2024, in which many counties shifted right by over 10 points, Presidio remained strongly Democratic, with Donald Trump only increasing his vote share by 2 points, making Presidio the only county on the Mexican border where Democrats received over 60 percent.

United States presidential election results for Presidio County, Texas
Year	Republican		Democratic		Third party(ies)	
Year	No.	%	No.	%	No.	%
1912	87	25.29%	187	54.36%	70	20.35%
1916	27	9.89%	245	89.74%	1	0.37%
1920	122	33.33%	238	65.03%	6	1.64%
1924	68	19.54%	267	76.72%	13	3.74%
1928	254	44.64%	315	55.36%	0	0.00%
1932	112	11.46%	863	88.33%	2	0.20%
1936	106	10.10%	938	89.42%	5	0.48%
1940	163	15.04%	917	84.59%	4	0.37%
1944	211	20.61%	648	63.28%	165	16.11%
1948	212	18.39%	907	78.66%	34	2.95%
1952	770	55.36%	621	44.64%	0	0.00%
1956	494	48.48%	517	50.74%	8	0.79%
1960	376	30.13%	866	69.39%	6	0.48%
1964	431	27.14%	1,156	72.80%	1	0.06%
1968	481	30.40%	969	61.25%	132	8.34%
1972	785	53.69%	674	46.10%	3	0.21%
1976	687	35.49%	1,232	63.64%	17	0.88%
1980	723	40.19%	1,039	57.75%	37	2.06%
1984	837	44.01%	992	52.16%	73	3.84%
1988	586	33.09%	1,176	66.40%	9	0.51%
1992	400	21.15%	1,189	62.88%	302	15.97%
1996	383	22.32%	1,205	70.22%	128	7.46%
2000	618	35.17%	1,064	60.56%	75	4.27%
2004	715	37.83%	1,159	61.32%	16	0.85%
2008	489	27.83%	1,252	71.26%	16	0.91%
2012	504	27.74%	1,282	70.56%	31	1.71%
2016	652	29.53%	1,458	66.03%	98	4.44%
2020	721	32.49%	1,463	65.93%	35	1.58%
2024	686	34.40%	1,289	64.64%	19	0.95%

United States Senate election results for Presidio County, Texas1
Year	Republican		Democratic		Third party(ies)	
Year	No.	%	No.	%	No.	%
2024	651	33.56%	1,249	64.38%	40	2.06%

United States Senate election results for Presidio County, Texas2
Year	Republican		Democratic		Third party(ies)	
Year	No.	%	No.	%	No.	%
2020	651	31.13%	1,374	65.71%	66	3.16%

Texas Gubernatorial election results for Presidio County
Year	Republican		Democratic		Third party(ies)	
Year	No.	%	No.	%	No.	%
2022	561	32.54%	1,133	65.72%	30	1.74%

== In popular culture ==
The Howard Hawks film Rio Bravo, released 1959, starring John Wayne, Dean Martin, and Ricky Nelson, was set in Presidio County, but filmed in Tucson.

The Riata house and exteriors for Giant, released 1956, were filmed at Marfa. The big stars, Elizabeth Taylor, Rock Hudson, James Dean, and others stayed at the Hotel Paisano for two months.

High Lonesome, released in 1950, starring Chill Wills and John Drew Barrymore, was filmed in Antelope Springs, near Marfa.

The county was mentioned in Hunter during part one of "City Under Siege" in the 1988–89 season.

In The Three Burials of Melquiades Estrada, the mountains of Presidio County stand as Coahuila, where Pete carries friend Mel to be buried among the ruins of his Mexican town of Jimenez.

U.S. Supreme Court Justice Antonin Scalia died at the historic Cibolo Creek Ranch near Shafter, Texas in 2016.

== Education ==
Marfa Independent School District serves eastern Presidio County, while Presidio Independent School District serves western Presidio County.

Presidio County is within the Odessa College District for community college.

== Communities ==
=== Cities ===
- Marfa (county seat)
- Presidio

=== Census-designated place ===
- Redford

=== Unincorporated communities ===
- Candelaria
- Chinati
- Plata
- Ruidosa

=== Ghost towns ===
- Adobes
- Fort Holland
- Pilares
- Porvenir
- Shafter

== See also ==
- List of museums in West Texas
- National Register of Historic Places listings in Presidio County, Texas
- Recorded Texas Historic Landmarks in Presidio County
- Presidio County Courthouse
