= Ruidosa, Texas =

- Unincorporated community
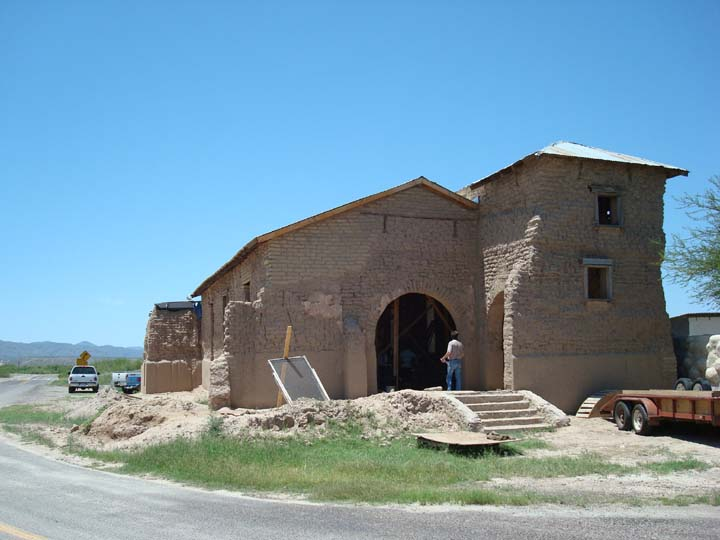
- Ruins of Sacred Heart Mission along FM 170 in Ruidosa
- Nickname: Ruidene, Texas
- Location within Texas
- Coordinates: 29°58′59″N 104°40′46″W
- Country: United States
- State: Texas
- County: Presidio
- Elevation: 2,795 ft (852 m)
- Time zone: UTC-6 (Central (CST))
  - Summer (DST): UTC-5 (CDT)
- ZIP codes: 79843
- Area code: 432
- GNIS feature ID: 1378997

Ruidosa is an unincorporated community in Presidio County, Texas, United States.

== Education ==
Ruidosa is zoned to schools in the Presidio Independent School District.

== Climate ==
This area has a large amount of sunshine year round due to its stable descending air and high pressure. According to the Köppen climate classification, Ruidosa has a desert climate, BWh on climate maps.

== Cultural heritage ==
The Sacred Heart Mission, El Corazón Sagrado de la Iglesia de Jesús, is an adobe church completed in 1915 and served the local community until closure in the 1950s. In 2026, the National Trust for Historic Preservation listed the location on their annual "America’s 11 Most Endangered Historic Places" citing need for further renovation and a proposal to construct a portion of the Mexico–United States border wall within a few hundred yards.
