= Presidio, Texas =

- City
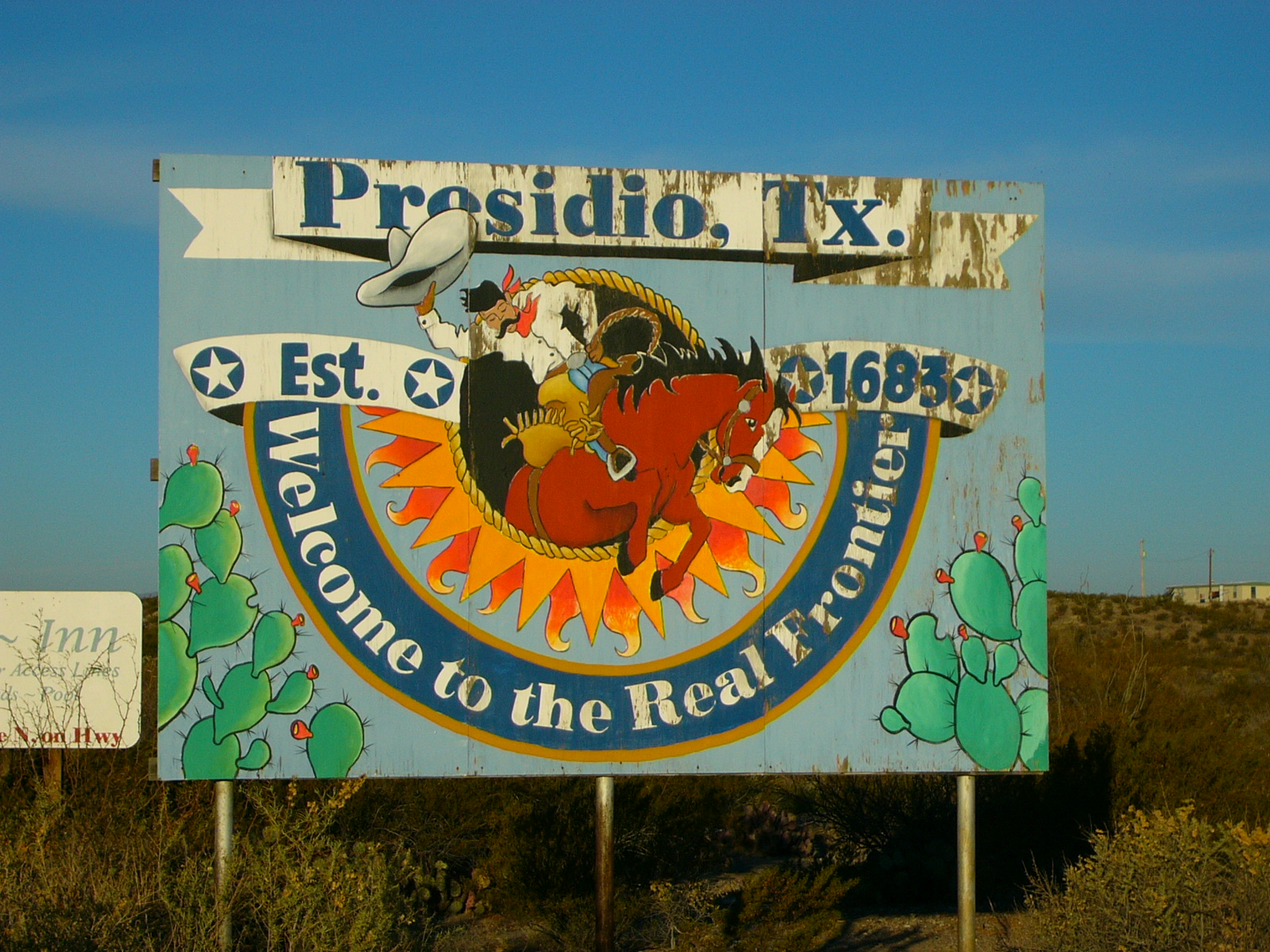
- Signpost outside the city of Presidio, Texas

- Location of Presidio, Texas
- Coordinates: 29°33′41″N 104°21′59″W
- Country: United States
- State: Texas
- County: Presidio

Government
  - Mayor: John Ferguson

Area
  - Total: 2.58 sq mi (6.67 km^{2})
  - Land: 2.58 sq mi (6.67 km^{2})
  - Water: 0 sq mi (0.00 km^{2})
- Elevation: 2,579 ft (786 m)

Population (2020)
  - Total: 3,264
  - Density: 1,270/sq mi (489/km^{2})
- Time zone: UTC-6 (Central (CST))
  - Summer (DST): UTC-5 (CDT)
- ZIP codes: 79845-79846
- Area code: 432
- FIPS code: 48-59396
- GNIS feature ID: 2411489
- Website: City of Presidio

Presidio is a city in Presidio County, Texas, United States. It is situated on the Rio Grande (Río Bravo del Norte), on the opposite side of the U.S.–Mexico border from Ojinaga, Chihuahua. The name originates from Spanish and means "fortress". Its population was 3,264 at the 2020 census.

Presidio is on the Farm to Market Road 170, and U.S. Route 67, 18 miles (29 km) south of Shafter in Presidio County. Presidio is about 250 miles (400 km) southeast of El Paso, 240 miles (390 km) southwest of Odessa, and 145 miles (233 km) northeast of Chihuahua City.

== History ==
The junction of the Rio Conchos and Rio Grande at Presidio was settled thousands of years ago by hunting and gathering peoples. By 1200 CE, the local Native Americans had adopted agriculture and lived in small, closely knit, La Junta Indians settlements, which the Spaniards later called pueblos.

The first Spaniards came to Presidio in 1535. Álvar Núñez Cabeza de Vaca and his three companions stopped at the Native American pueblo, placed a cross on the mountainside, and called the village La Junta de las Cruces. On December 10, 1582, Antonio de Espejo and his company arrived at the site and named the pueblo San Juan Evangelista. By 1681, the area of Presidio was known as La Junta de los Ríos, 'The Junction of the Rivers'. Five Jumanos towns were located along the Rio Grande to the north of the junction, consisting largely of permanent houses. In 1683, Juan Sabeata, the chief of the Jumanos, reported having seen a fiery cross on the mountain at Presidio and requested that a mission be established at La Junta. The settlement in 1684 became known as La Navidad en Las Cruces. The missions La Navidad en las Cruces, San Francisco de los Julimes, San Antonio de los Puliques, Apostol Santiago, and Santa María de la Redonda may have been established on the Texas side of the Rio Grande at La Junta.

Around 1760, a penal colony and military garrison of 60 men were established near Presidio. In 1830, the name of the area around Presidio was changed from La Junta de los Rios to Presidio del Norte. White American settlers came to Presidio in 1848 after the Mexican War. Among them was John Spencer, who operated a horse ranch on the U.S. side of the Rio Grande near Presidio. Ben Leaton and Milton Faver, former scalp hunters for the Mexican government, built private forts in the area.

In 1790, the Spanish signed a peace agreement with the Lipan Apache, creating El Barrio del Cementerio de Los Lipanes, now located downtown.

In 1849, a Comanche raid almost destroyed Presidio, and in 1850, Indians drove off most of the cattle in town. A post office was established at Presidio in 1868, and the first public school was opened in 1887.

During the Mexican Revolution, General Pancho Villa often used Ojinaga as his headquarters for operations and visited Presidio on numerous occasions. As a result of Pancho Villa's force's raid and capture of Ojinaga on January 10, 1914, many Mexican army troops and civilians fled to Presidio seeking a safe haven. U.S. forces detained 2,000 Mexican refugees in Presidio, eventually marching them north 60 miles to Camp Marfa. The refugees later were sent by train to Ft. Bliss (El Paso).

In 1930, the Kansas City, Mexico and Orient Railway reached Presidio and the Presidio–Ojinaga International Rail Bridge was built. The population grew from 96 in 1925 to 1,671 in 1988, but the number of businesses declined from 70 in 1933 to 22 in 1988. At the end of 1988, Presidio experienced a population boom, due in part to previously undocumented immigrants enrolled in the amnesty program. The city's population in 1990 was 3,422. Despite Presidio having been occupied continuously since ancient times, the community was finally incorporated in 1980, with Herb Myers elected as Presidio's first mayor.

In 1986, the Texas Department of Transportation opened a two-lane bridge, connecting Presidio and Ojinaga, the Presidio–Ojinaga International Bridge. By 2019, a second span was constructed, with the original bridge being refurbished. The increased bridge capacity is projected to meet higher traffic, mainly commercial and agricultural in nature.

As of 2020, Presidio's local economy is based largely upon employment at Presidio Independent School District, United States Customs and Border Protection, and local retail businesses.

In 2010, Presidio built the world's largest sodium-sulfur battery to provide power when the city's only line to the United States power grid goes down.

== Geography ==
According to the United States Census Bureau, the city has a total area of 2.6 square miles (6.7 km^{2}), all land. Presidio is located near the confluence of the Rio Conchos and the Rio Grande. The Rio Conchos flows in a northeasterly direction from its source in the Sierra Madre in the state of Chihuahua, Mexico. Commonly referred to as "La Junta" (the joining), the two rivers resulted in plentiful water, creating a flood plain that is ideal for farming.

=== Climate ===
Presidio has a hot desert climate (Bwh).

Climate data for Presidio, Texas (Oct 1, 1927–Mar 6, 2013)
Month	Jan	Feb	Mar	Apr	May	Jun	Jul	Aug	Sep	Oct	Nov	Dec	Year
Record high °F (°C)	88 (31)	95 (35)	105 (41)	106 (41)	114 (46)	117 (47)	116 (47)	114 (46)	112 (44)	103 (39)	95 (35)	88 (31)	117 (47)
Mean daily maximum °F (°C)	67.3 (19.6)	73.9 (23.3)	81.9 (27.7)	90.2 (32.3)	97.4 (36.3)	102.6 (39.2)	101.1 (38.4)	99.8 (37.7)	94.9 (34.9)	87.2 (30.7)	75.7 (24.3)	67.4 (19.7)	86.6 (30.3)
Daily mean °F (°C)	50.4 (10.2)	56.1 (13.4)	63.2 (17.3)	71.7 (22.1)	79.9 (26.6)	86.9 (30.5)	87.0 (30.6)	85.8 (29.9)	80.7 (27.1)	71.4 (21.9)	58.8 (14.9)	50.9 (10.5)	70.2 (21.2)
Mean daily minimum °F (°C)	33.4 (0.8)	38.3 (3.5)	44.6 (7.0)	53.2 (11.8)	62.4 (16.9)	71.2 (21.8)	73.0 (22.8)	71.8 (22.1)	66.5 (19.2)	55.5 (13.1)	41.9 (5.5)	34.4 (1.3)	53.9 (12.2)
Record low °F (°C)	4 (−16)	7 (−14)	20 (−7)	25 (−4)	34 (1)	50 (10)	59 (15)	58 (14)	42 (6)	27 (−3)	13 (−11)	10 (−12)	4 (−16)
Average precipitation inches (mm)	0.41 (10)	0.33 (8.4)	0.18 (4.6)	0.31 (7.9)	0.64 (16)	1.22 (31)	1.54 (39)	1.43 (36)	1.48 (38)	0.91 (23)	0.38 (9.7)	0.42 (11)	9.24 (235)
Average snowfall inches (cm)	0.1 (0.25)	0.0 (0.0)	0.0 (0.0)	0.0 (0.0)	0.0 (0.0)	0.0 (0.0)	0.0 (0.0)	0.0 (0.0)	0.0 (0.0)	0.0 (0.0)	0.0 (0.0)	0.2 (0.51)	0.4 (1.0)
Average precipitation days (≥ 0.01 in)	2	2	1	1	3	4	6	5	4	3	2	2	35
Source: Western Regional Climate Center, Desert Research Institute

== Demographics ==
Historical population
Census	Pop.	Note	%±
1880	147		—
1930	1,202		—
1980	1,723		—
1990	3,072		78.3%
2000	4,167		35.6%
2010	4,426		6.2%
2020	3,264		−26.3%
U.S. Decennial Census; 1850–1900 1910; 1920 1930 1940; 1950 1960 1970; 1980 1990 2000; 2010 2020

Presidio first appeared as a census designated place in the 1980 United States census; and listed as a city in the 1990 U.S. census.

=== Racial and ethnic composition ===
Presidio city, Texas – Racial and ethnic composition Note: the US Census treats Hispanic/Latino as an ethnic category. This table excludes Latinos from the racial categories and assigns them to a separate category. Hispanics/Latinos may be of any race.
Race / Ethnicity (NH = Non-Hispanic)	Pop 2000	Pop 2010	Pop 2020	% 2000	% 2010	% 2020
White alone (NH)	221	168	62	5.30%	3.80%	1.90%
Black or African American alone (NH)	3	16	8	0.07%	0.36%	0.25%
Native American or Alaska Native alone (NH)	3	8	4	0.07%	0.18%	0.12%
Asian alone (NH)	2	73	62	0.05%	1.65%	1.90%
Native Hawaiian or Pacific Islander alone (NH)	1	0	0	0.02%	0.00%	0.00%
Other race alone (NH)	1	0	1	0.02%	0.00%	0.03%
Multiracial (NH)	14	10	8	0.34%	0.23%	0.25%
Hispanic or Latino (any race)	3,922	4,151	3,119	94.12%	93.79%	95.56%
Total	4,167	4,426	3,264	100.00%	100.00%	100.00%

=== 2020 census ===
As of the 2020 census, 3,264 people, 1,180 households, and 729 families were residing in the city. The median age was 40.5 years; 27.4% of the residents were under 18 and 19.3% were 65 or older. For every 100 females, there were 91.1 males, and for every 100 females 18 and over, there were 86.3 males age 18 and over.

Of the 1,180 households in Presidio, 37.5% had children under 18 living in them, 55.8% were married-couple households, 13.9% were households with a male householder and no spouse or partner present, and 28.6% were households with a female householder and no spouse or partner present. About 23.4% of households were made up of individuals, and 11.7% had someone living alone who was 65 years of age or older.

Of the 1,515 housing units, 22.1% were vacant. The homeowner vacancy rate was 2.9% and the rental vacancy rate was 15.3%.

None of the residents lived in urban areas, while 100.0% lived in rural areas.

Racial composition as of the 2020 census
Race	Number	Percentage
White	872	26.7%
Black or African American	8	0.2%
American Indian and Alaska Native	15	0.5%
Asian	62	1.9%
Some other race	723	22.2%
Two or more races	1,584	48.5%
Hispanic or Latino (of any race)	3,119	95.6%

=== 2010 census ===
As of the 2010 census, 5,106 people, 1,285 households, and 1,033 families resided in the city. The population density was 1,620.1 inhabitants per square mile (625.5/km^{2}). The 1,541 housing units had an average density of 599.1 per square mile (231.3/km^{2}). The racial makeup of the city was 83.39% White, 0.10% African American, 0.14% Native American, 0.05% Asian, 0.02% Pacific Islander, 15.43% from other races, and 0.86% from two or more races. Hispanics or Latinos of any race were 94.12% of the population.

Of the 1,285 households, 49.3% had children under 18 living with them, 62.6% were married couples living together, 14.4% had a female householder with no husband present, and 19.6% were not families. About 18.8% of all households were made up of individuals, and 10.5% had someone living alone who was 65 or older. The average household size was 3.24, and the average family size was 3.73.

In the city, the age distribution of the population was 37.2% under 18, 8.7% from 18 to 24, 25.5% from 25 to 44, 17.4% from 45 to 64, and 11.1% who were 65 or older. The median age was 28 years. For every 100 females, there were 89.9 males. For every 100 females 18 and over, there were 84.8 males.

The median income in the city for a household was $18,031 and for a family was $19,601. Males had a median income of $20,469 versus $15,000 for females. The per capita income for the city was $7,098. About 40.4% of families and 43.0% of the population were below the poverty line, including 48.3% of those under 18 and 64.5% of those 65 or over.

== Consular missions ==
A Consulate of Mexico is in the city.

== Education ==
The City of Presidio is served by the Presidio Independent School District, which includes Presidio Elementary School, Lucy Rede Franco Middle School, and Presidio High School. In 2011, Shella R. Condino, physics teacher at Presidio High School, was unanimously chosen by the National Aviation Hall of Fame's selection committee to receive the 2011 A. Scott Crossfield Aerospace Education Teacher of the Year Award. In 2016, Dr. Edgar B. Tibayan, principal of Lucy Rede Franco Middle School, was adjudged as Texas Principal of the Year. He represented the state of Texas in the search for National Principal of the Year in 2016.

The Presidio Schools count about 1,300 students, prekindergarten through 12th grade. Presidio students have competed nationally in rocketry, with a wide array of science, technology, engineering, and math classes and activities in which all students may participate. The district also offers numerous activities in the fine arts, including art, band, jazz ensemble, mariachi, and an annual school musical.

All Presidio schools are fully accredited by the Texas Education Agency.

Presidio County is within the Odessa College District for community college.

== Transportation ==
=== Intercity bus ===
Presidio is the terminus of All Aboard America!'s twice-daily service that links the city to Midland International Air and Space Port, with intermediate stops at Odessa, Crane, McCamey, Ft. Stockton, Alpine, and Marfa.

== Tourism ==
Presidio is located3 miles north of Fort Leaton State Historic Site. Plans are underway to open Chinati Mountains State Natural Area, 15 northwest of Presidio, along FM 170. Big Bend Ranch State Park is adjacent to Presidio. Connecting Presidio south to Lajitas is the Camino del Rio (River Road), a 50-mile scenic drive following the Rio Grande.
