= Redford, Texas =

- CDP
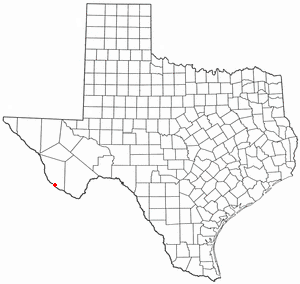
- Location of Redford, Texas

- Coordinates: 29°26′03″N 104°10′57″W
- Country: United States
- State: Texas
- County: Presidio

Area
  - Total: 7.4 sq mi (19 km^{2})
  - Land: 7.4 sq mi (19 km^{2})
  - Water: 0.0 sq mi (0 km^{2})
- Elevation: 2,572 ft (784 m)

Population (2020)
  - Total: 43
  - Density: 5.8/sq mi (2.2/km^{2})
- Time zone: UTC-6 (Central (CST))
  - Summer (DST): UTC-5 (CDT)
- ZIP code: 79846
- Area code: 915
- FIPS code: 48-61076
- GNIS feature ID: 2409152

Redford is a census-designated place (CDP) in Presidio County, Texas, United States. Its population was 43 at the 2020 census.

== Geography ==
According to the United States Census Bureau in 2000, the CDP has a total area of 45.1 square miles (117 km^{2}), of which 45.0 square miles (117 km^{2}) are land and 0.02% is covered by water. The CDP lost area prior to the 2010 census, dropping it down to 7.4 square miles (19 km^{2}), all land.

=== Climate ===
This area has a large amount of sunshine year round due to its stable descending air and high pressure. According to the Köppen climate classification, Redford has a desert climate, Bwh on climate maps.

== Demographics ==
Historical population
| Census | Pop. | Note | %± |
|---|---|---|---|
| 2000 | 132 | | — |
| 2010 | 90 | | −31.8% |
| 2020 | 43 | | −52.2% |
U.S. Decennial Census; 1850–1900 1910; 1920 1930 1940; 1950 1960 1970; 1980 1990 2000; 2010 2020

Redford first appeared as a census designated place in the 2000 U.S. census.

=== 2020 census ===
Redford CDP, Texas – Racial and ethnic composition Note: the US Census treats Hispanic/Latino as an ethnic category. This table excludes Latinos from the racial categories and assigns them to a separate category. Hispanics/Latinos may be of any race.
| Race / Ethnicity (NH = Non-Hispanic) | Pop 2000 | Pop 2010 | Pop 2020 | % 2000 | % 2010 | % 2020 |
|---|---|---|---|---|---|---|
| White alone (NH) | 15 | 7 | 0 | 11.36% | 7.78% | 0.00% |
| Black or African American alone (NH) | 0 | 0 | 1 | 0.00% | 0.00% | 2.33% |
| Native American or Alaska Native alone (NH) | 0 | 2 | 0 | 0.00% | 2.22% | 0.00% |
| Asian alone (NH) | 1 | 0 | 0 | 0.76% | 0.00% | 0.00% |
| Native Hawaiian or Pacific Islander alone (NH) | 0 | 0 | 0 | 0.00% | 0.00% | 0.00% |
| Other race alone (NH) | 0 | 0 | 1 | 0.00% | 0.00% | 2.33% |
| Multiracial (NH) | 0 | 0 | 0 | 0.00% | 0.00% | 0.00% |
| Hispanic or Latino (any race) | 116 | 81 | 41 | 87.88% | 90.00% | 95.35% |
| Total | 132 | 90 | 43 | 100.00% | 100.00% | 100.00% |

=== 2000 census ===
As of the 2000 census, 132 people, 48 households, and 36 families resided in the CDP. The population density was 2.9 people per square mile (1.1/km^{2}). The 74 housing units had an average density of 1.6/sq mi (0.6/km^{2}). The racial makeup of the CDP was 87.88% White, 0.76% Native American, 0.76% Asian, and 10.61% from other races. Hispanic or Latino of any race were 87.88% of the population.

Of the 48 households, 39.6% had children under 18 living with them, 60.4% were married couples living together, 14.6% had a female householder with no husband present, and 25.0% were not families. About 18.8% of all households were made up of individuals, and 16.7% had someone living alone who was 65 or older. The average household size was 2.75, and the average family size was 3.25.

In the CDP, the age distribution of the population was 31.8% under 18, 6.1% from 18 to 24, 15.9% from 25 to 44, 22.0% from 45 to 64, and 24.2% who were 65 or older. The median age was 42 years. For every 100 females, there were 85.9 males. For every 100 females 18 and over, there were 83.7 males.

The median income in the CDP for a household was $15,417 and for a family was $15,903. Males had a median income of $16,250 versus $7,031 for females. The per capita income for the CDP was $3,577. About 65.7% of families and 83.8% of the population were living below the poverty line, including 100.0% of those under 18 and 37.0% of those over 64.

== Education ==
Redford is served by the Marfa Independent School District.

Presidio County is within the Odessa College District.
