= El Paso Holocaust Museum and Study Center =

Holocaust museum in El Paso, Texas

- Location within Texas
- Established: 1994
- Location: 715 N. Oregon; El Paso, Texas
- Coordinates: 31.816496°N 106.523599°W
- Type: Jewish history and studies
- Website: El Paso Holocaust Museum & Study Center

The El Paso Holocaust Museum and Study Center is located at 715 N. Oregon in the city and county of El Paso, in the U.S. state of Texas. The museum was founded in 1994 by Holocaust survivor Henry Kellen. It was established to educate the public about the Nazi dictatorship, its concentration camps, and resistance movements during World War II. Funding for the museum is provided through donations and grants.

== Admission, hours ==
Admission is free to the public. The museum is open six days a week. It is closed on Mondays, most national holidays, and Passover, Rosh Hashanah and Yom Kippur.

== See also ==
- List of museums in West Texas
