= El Paso Museum of Archaeology =

Archaeology museum in El Paso, Texas

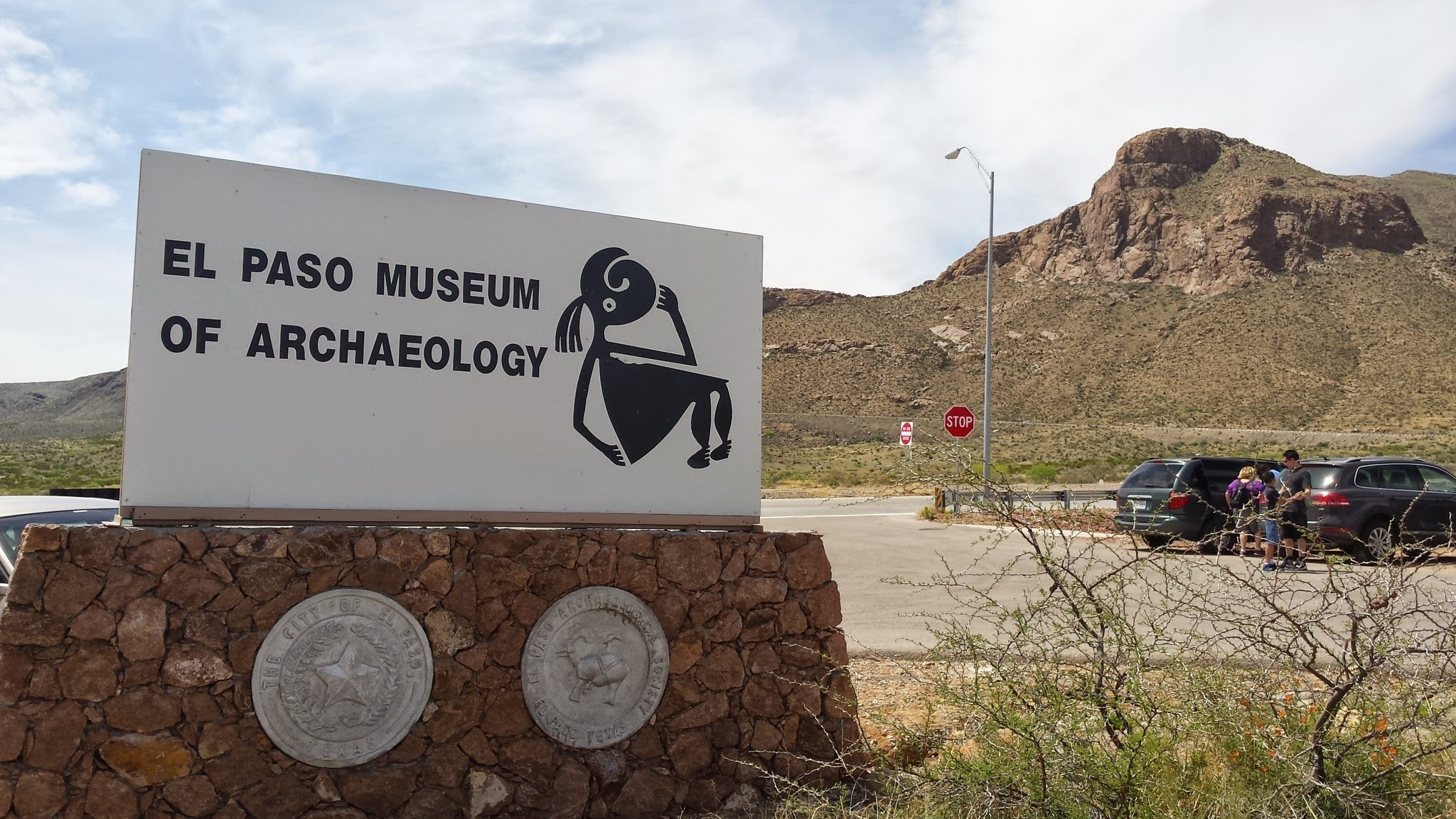
- The sign outside the El Paso Museum of Archaeology with the Franklin Mountains in the background.

- Location in Texas
- Established: 1977
- Location: 4301 Transmountain Road, El Paso, Texas
- Coordinates: 31.898804°N 106.440842°W
- Type: Archaeology
- Website: El Paso Museum of Archeology

The El Paso Museum of Archaeology presents information about the prehistory of the area surrounding El Paso, Texas. The museum is located in Wilderness Park, and is adjacent to the National Border Patrol Museum at the base of the Franklin Mountains, surrounded by Castner Range National Monument. It is located near several archaeological sites, including rock art in the Franklin Mountains and Mogollon pueblo sites. The museum attracts about 42,000 visitors every year.

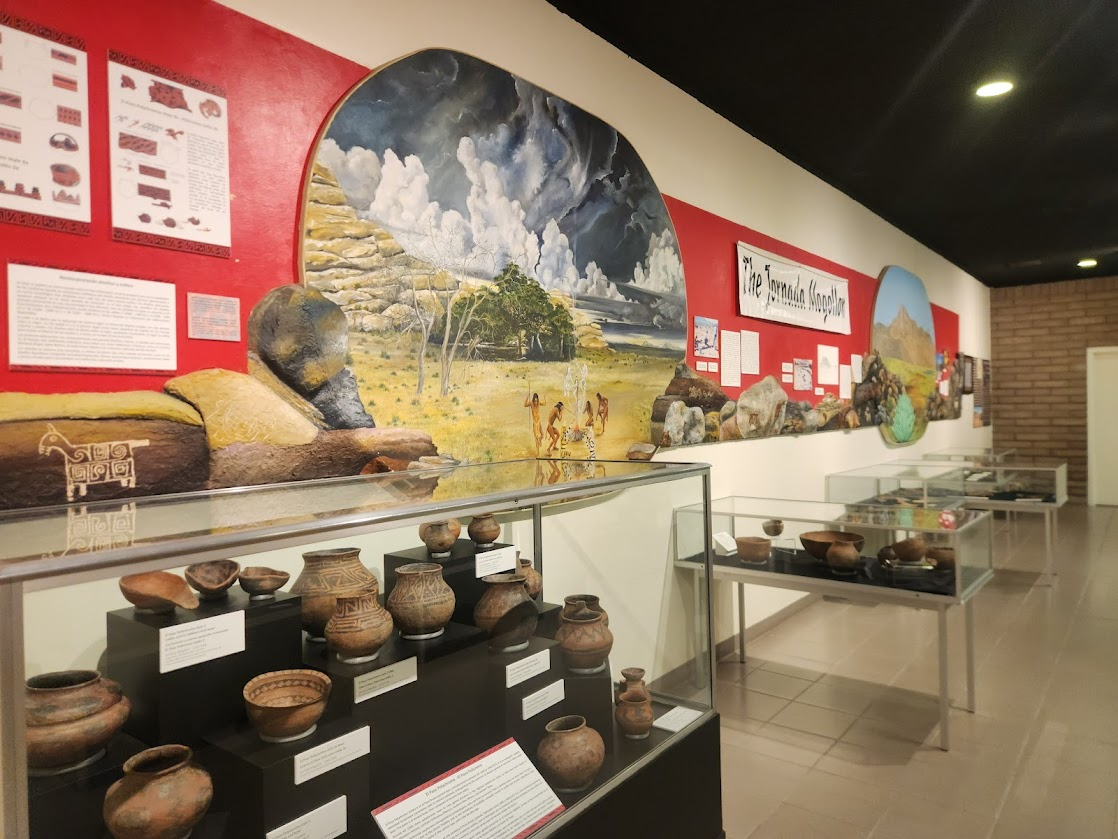
A section of the Jornada Mogollon exhibit

== History ==
The museum opened in 1977. The site of the museum was chosen because of the number of archaeological sites in the area. Wilderness Park, where the museum is located, was established with help from the El Paso Heritage Foundation. The El Paso Archaeological Society contracted with the City of El Paso to maintain the museum.

== Exhibits and facilities ==
The museum has a collection of permanent archaeological artifacts reflecting 14,000 years of prehistory in the El Paso area, the greater Southwest, and northern Mexico. The museum's artifacts have been appraised at a price of around $2 million. Artifacts on display include 800-year-old agave fiber cloth, various trade items, pottery, and jewelry. Other items include pre-Columbian art and objects from Mexico. A series of dioramas provide an insight into ancient history of the region. The dioramas depict the cultures of the Casas Grandes and Jornada Mogollon.

The El Paso Museum of Archaeology has won grants to support various programs. In 2014, Humanities Texas awarded $1,000 for the support of speakers and exhibits.

== Festivals and activities ==
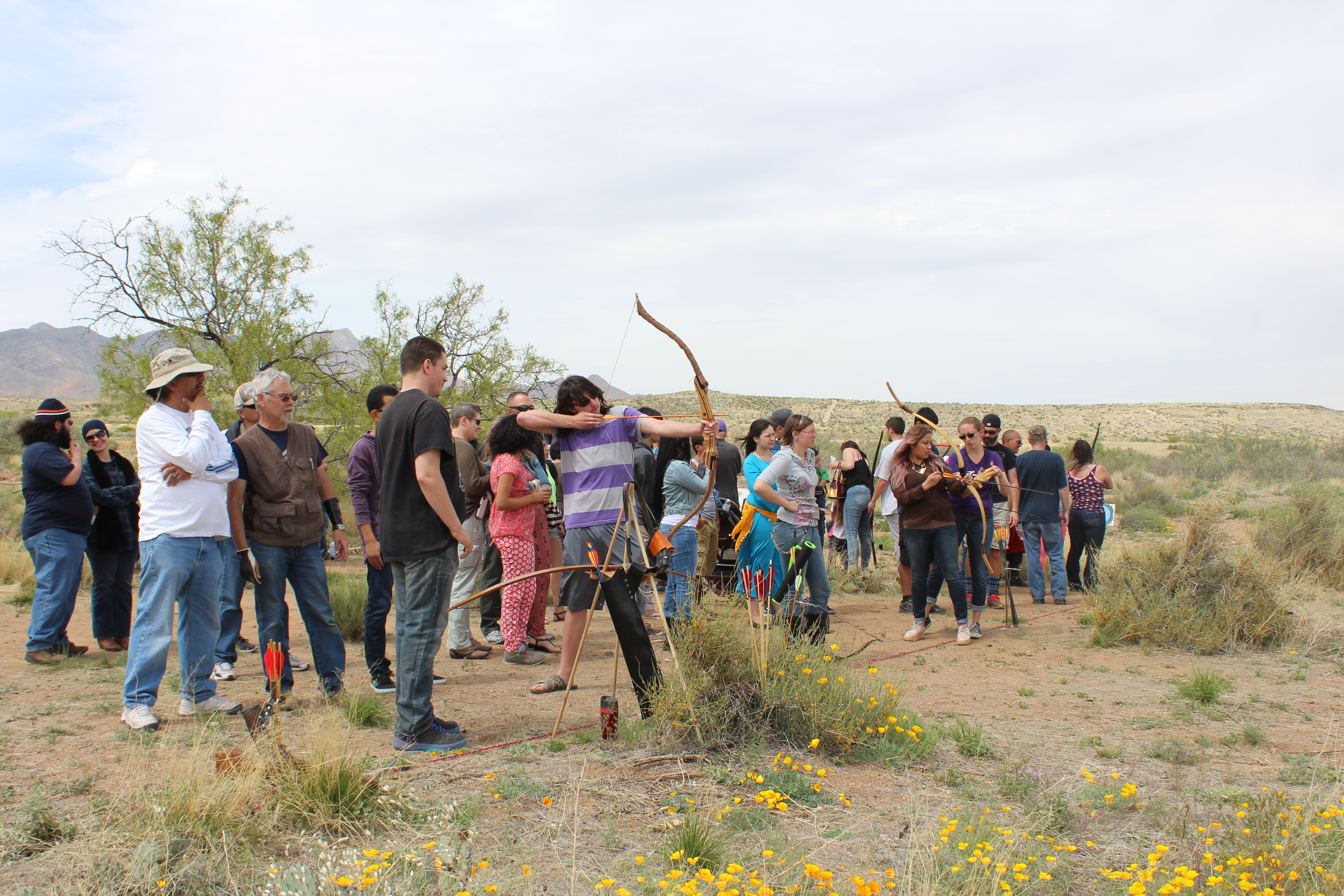
Archery during 2015 Franklin Mountains Poppies Fest at the Museum of Archaeology.

In the spring, the museum hosts the Annual Franklin Mountain Poppies Fest which includes flowers, activities, food, and wildlife encounters.

The museum offers conferences; a signature event is the biennial Jornada Mogollon Conference which takes place on odd-numbered years.

The museum's mission statement is, "The El Paso Museum of Archaeology is dedicated to the narration, interpretation and preservation of archaeological and anthropological artifacts through research, exhibits, education, and special programs, with a focus on the prehistory and culture of the El Paso area and the Southwest". Group tours are free and available when booked in advance.

== Nature ==
Family activities include nature trails for exploring the flora, fauna and geology of the region. The museum has about 15 acres of natural area surrounding the building. There are over 250 varieties of native Chihuahuan Desert plants to view along a mile-long nature trail and outside the building. In addition, there are viewing areas for the Franklin Mountains, Mount Sierra Blanca and outdoor exhibits based on replicas of Apache life.

Flora from the El Paso Museum of Archaeology
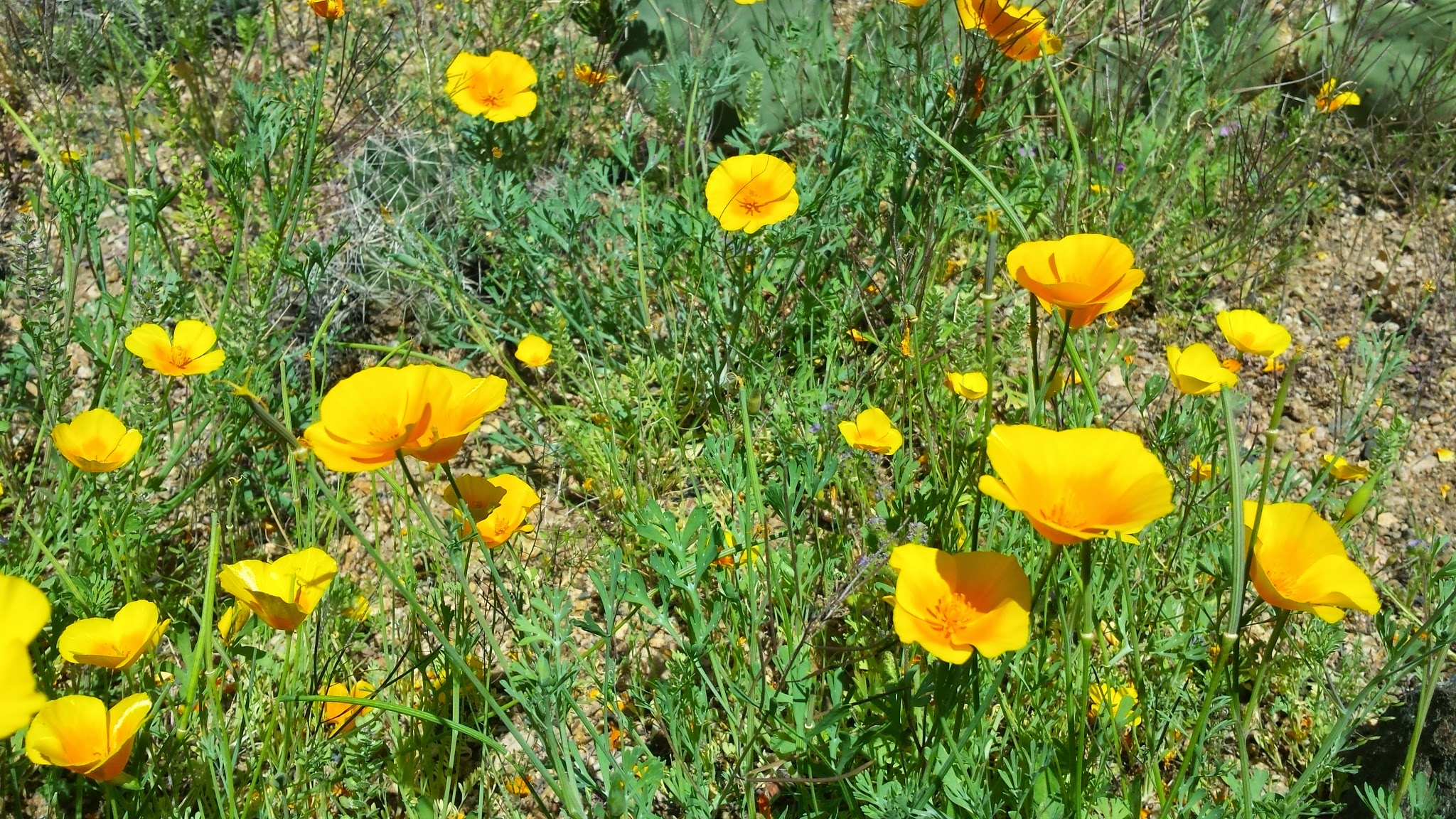
Mexican Poppies blooming outside the El Paso Museum of Archaeology.

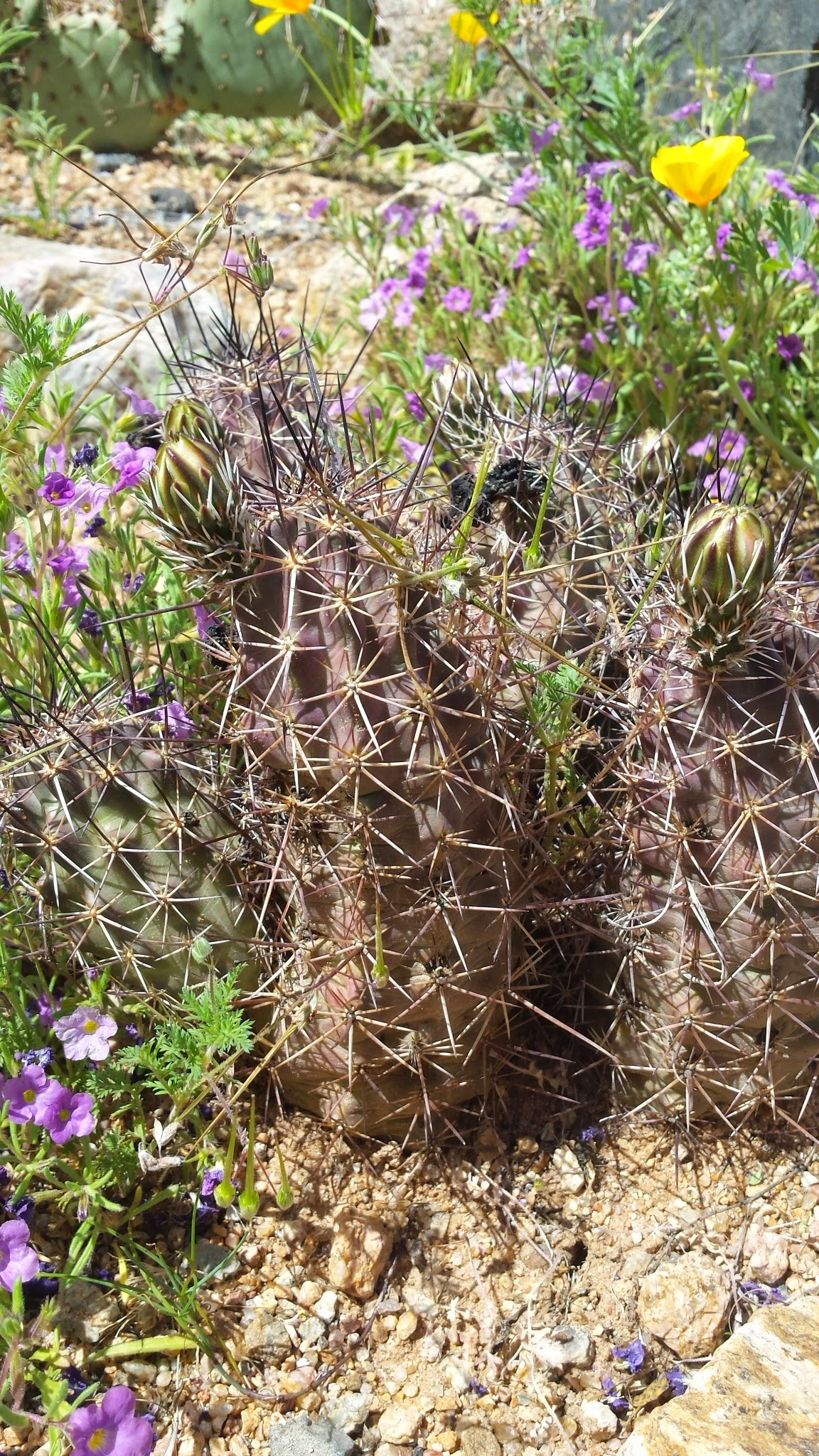
Fendler's Hedgehog Cactus. Echinocereus fendleri outside the museum.

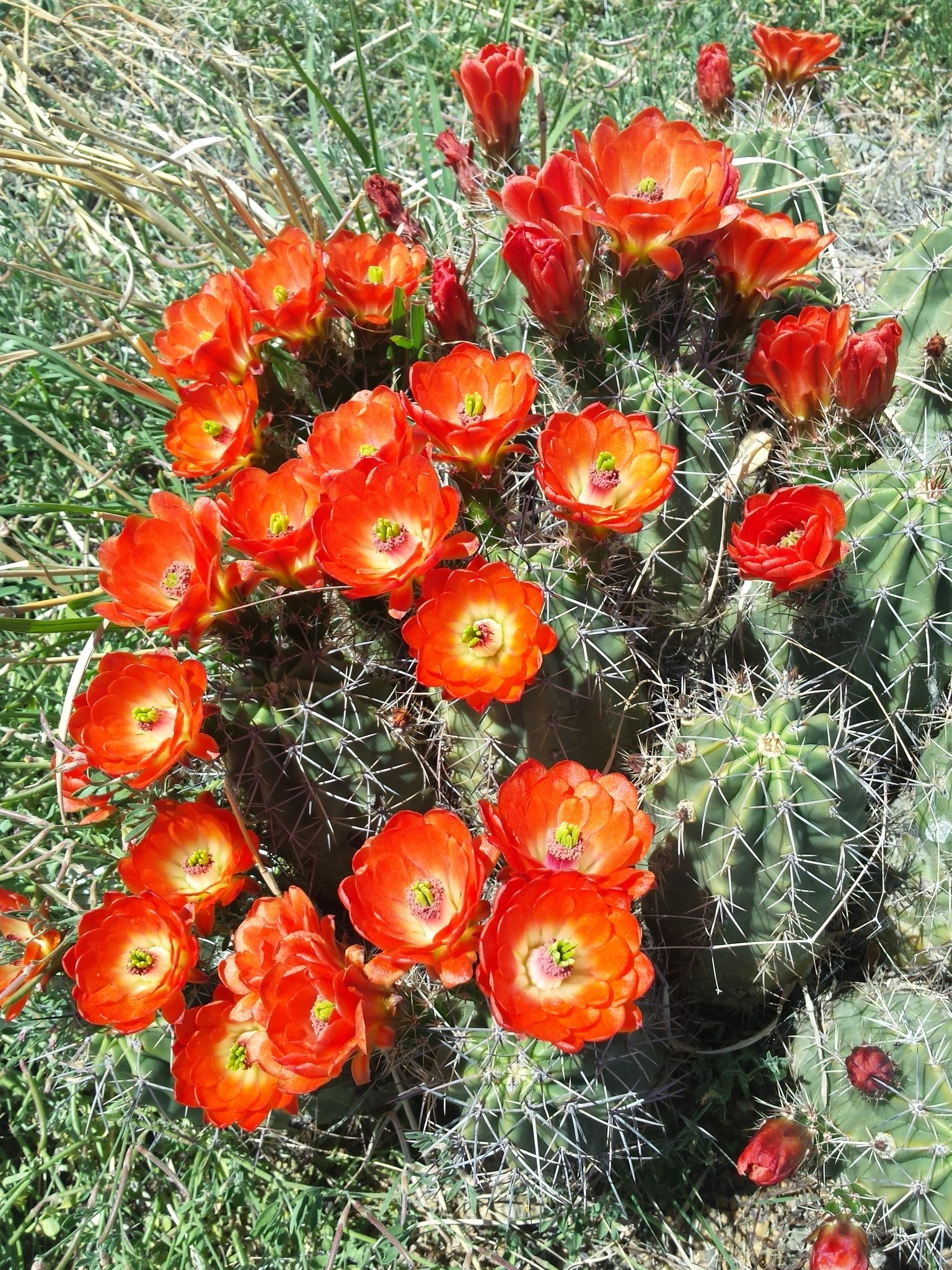
Claret cup cactus in spring bloom.

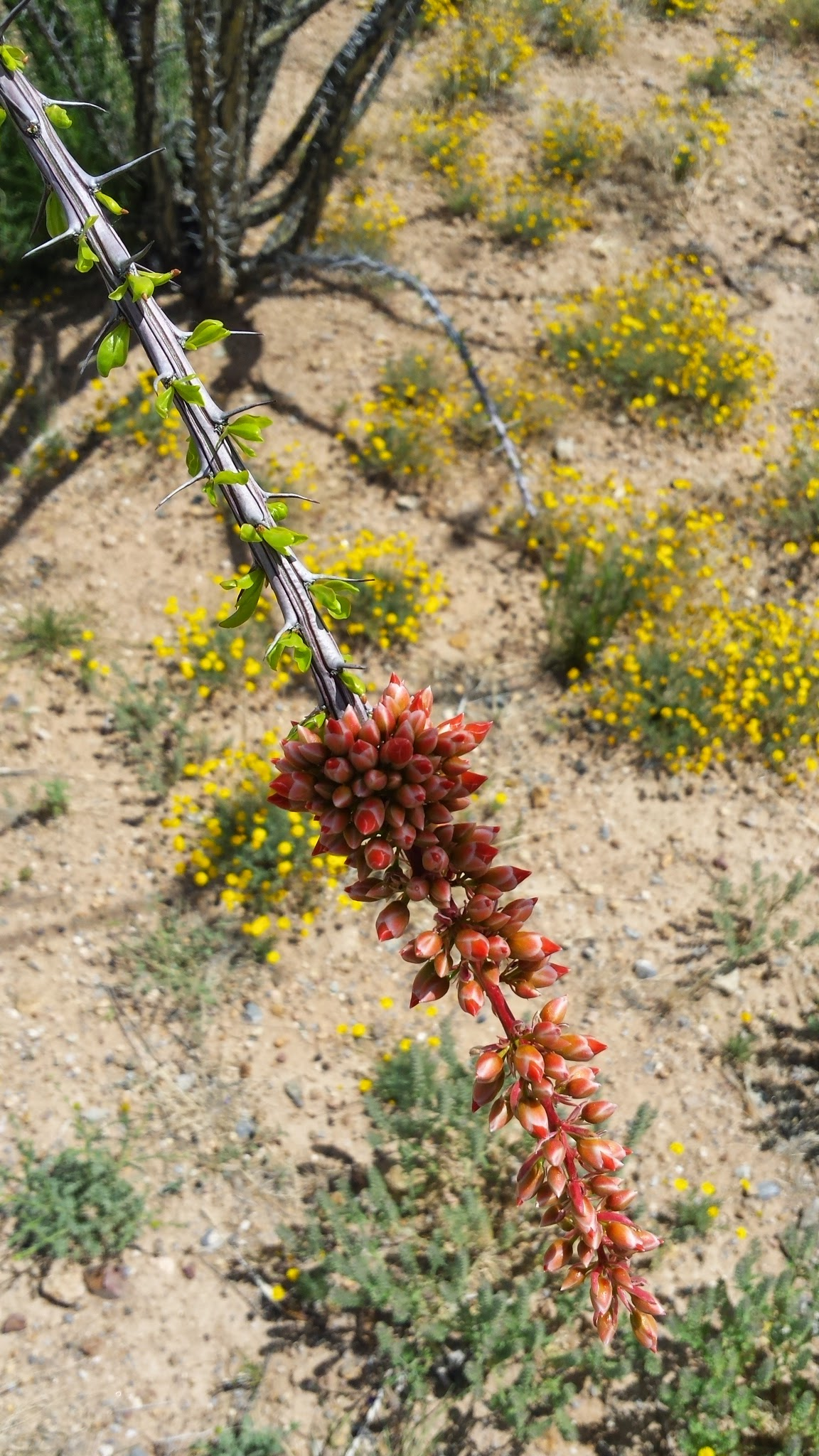
Ocotillo flowering in front of other desert flowers.

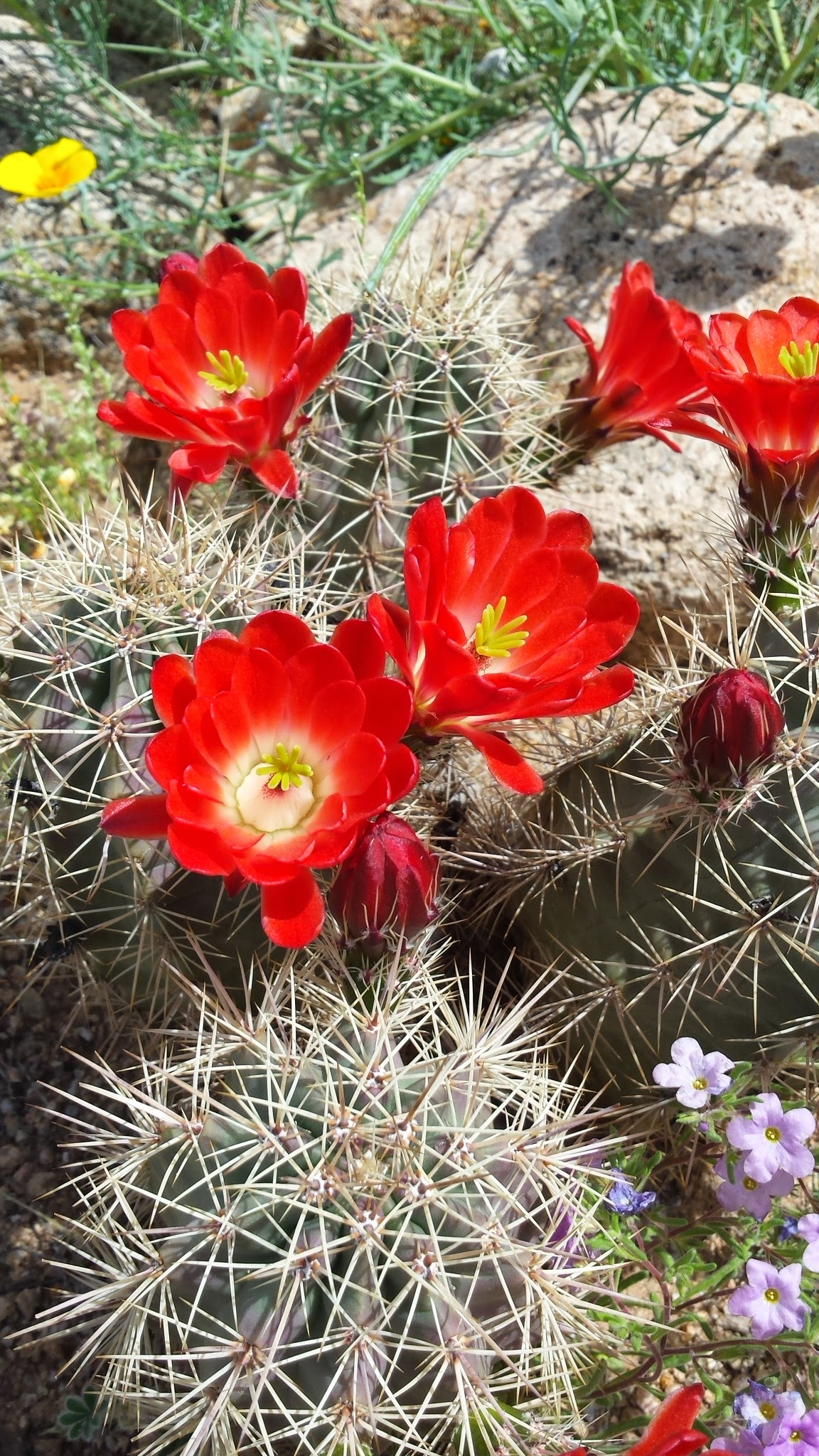
Claret cup cactus and desert flowers in bloom.

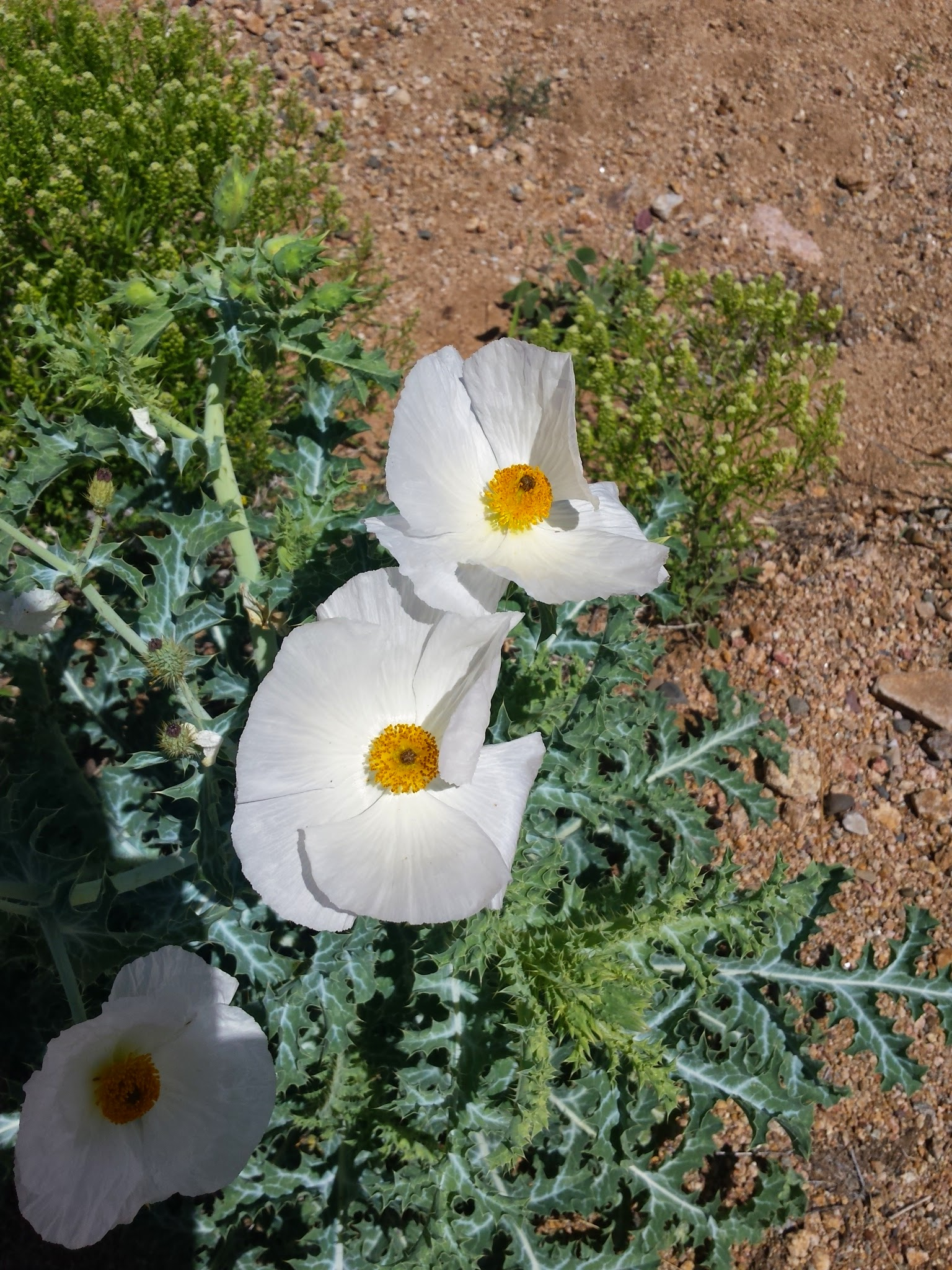
Prickly Poppy (Argemone pleiacantha) in spring bloom.

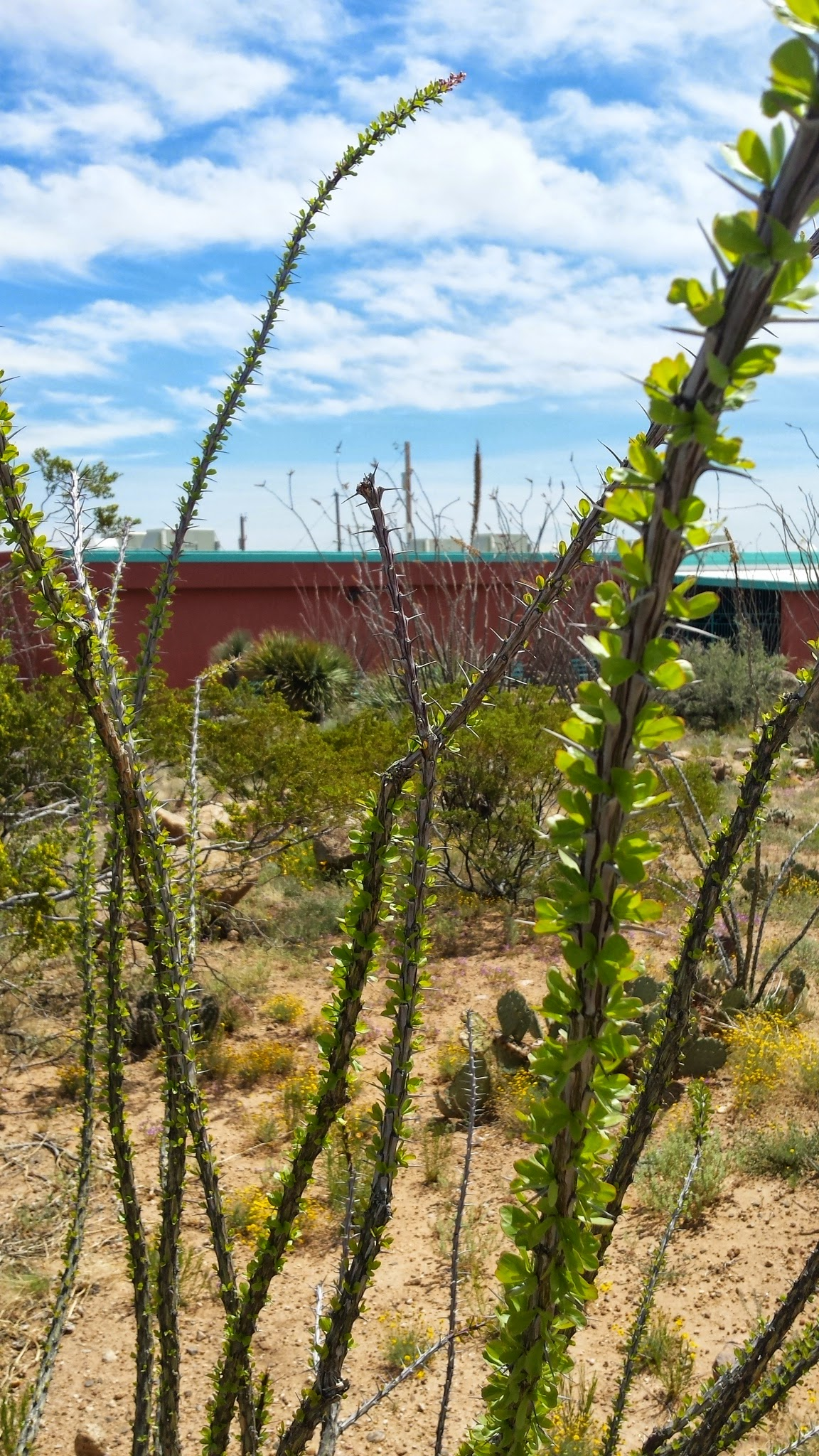
Ocotillo Leaves in front of the El Paso Museum of Archaeology.

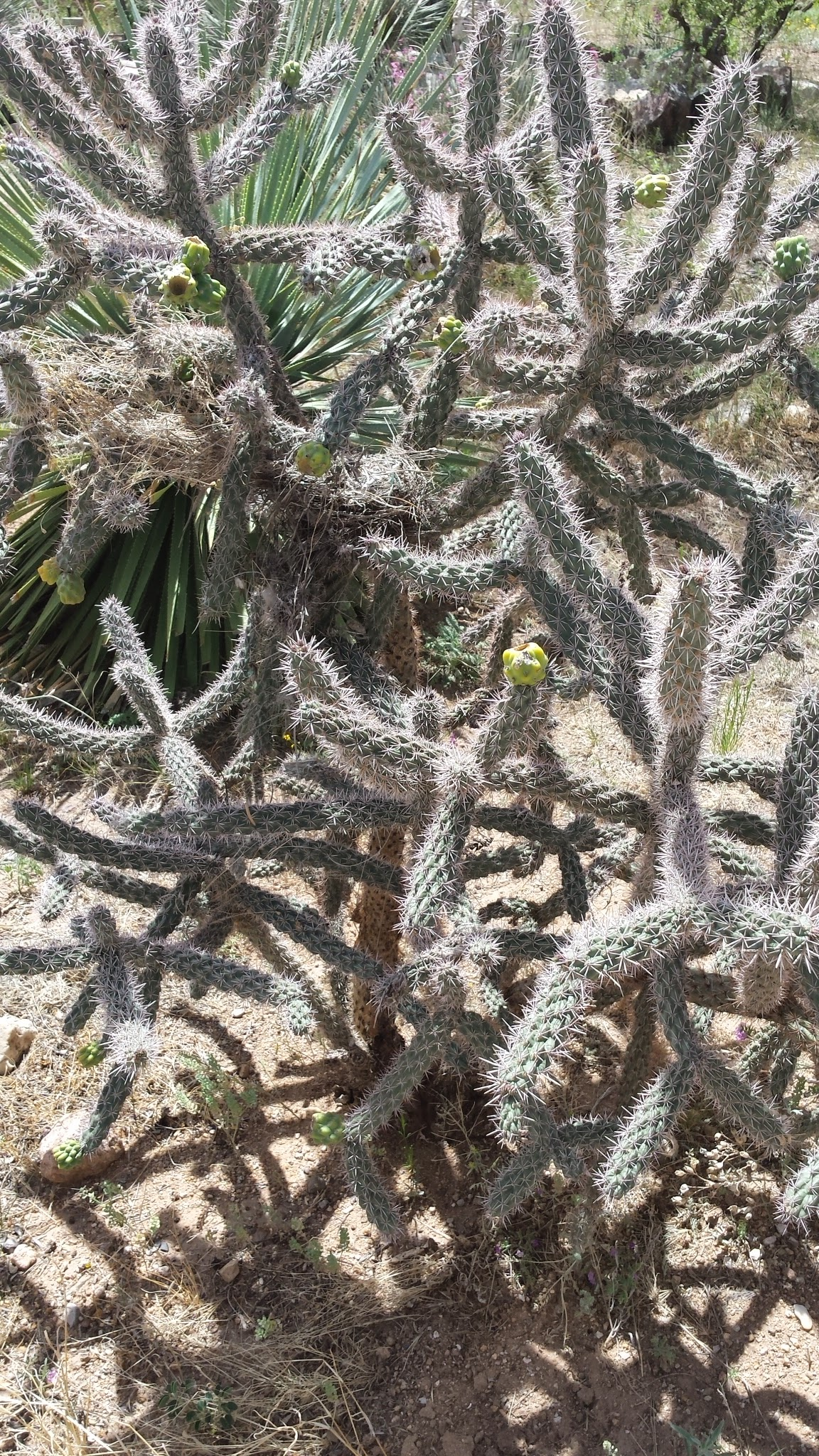
Cholla cactus at the El Paso Museum of Archaeology.

== See also ==
- List of museums in West Texas
