= El Paso Museum of History =

Museum in El Paso, Texas, USA

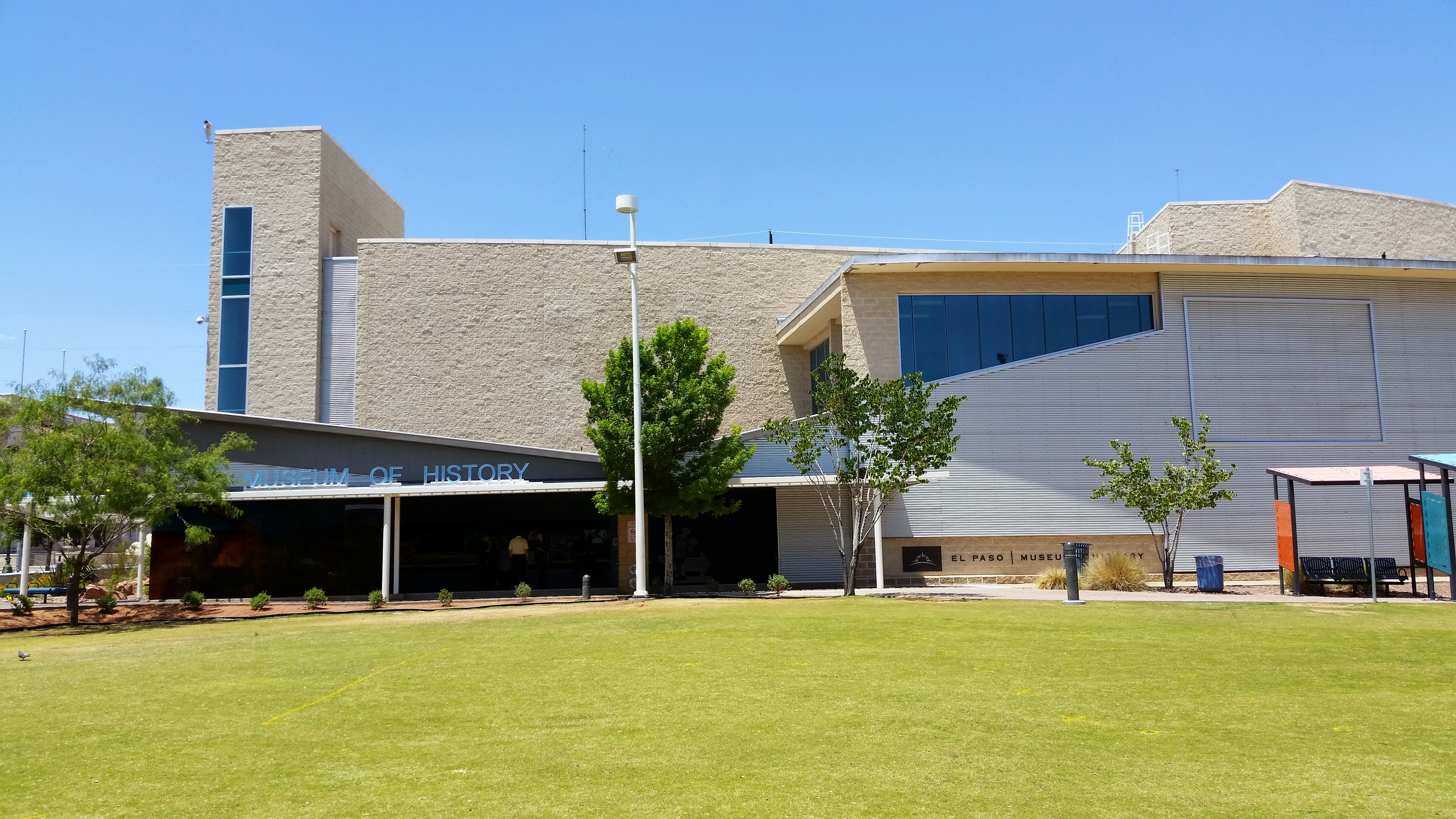
- Entrance to the El Paso Museum of History facing Cleveland Park.

- Location within Texas
- Established: 1974
- Location: 510 N. Santa Fe Street; El Paso, Texas
- Coordinates: 31.759998°N 106.491637°W
- Type: History Museum
- Website: Official Site

The El Paso Museum of History is a museum located in downtown El Paso, Texas which presents information about the past 400 years of history in the United States/Mexico border region. The museum has over 16,000 feet of exhibition space. Galleries in the museum feature traveling exhibitions as well as several permanent exhibitions. The museum also presents special programs and has a permanent digital touchscreen wall and a traveling wall. The museum is run by the City of El Paso.

== History ==
The museum started as a Cavalry Museum in 1974. At that time, it mainly featured information about "the mounted history of the West". In 1980, the name was changed to the El Paso Museum of History. The museum was supervised by the El Paso Museum of Art director until the El Paso Museum of History hired its director in December 1990.

The museum's building was considered undersized and in a poor location, so in 2000, the museum was included as part of a bond issue to build a new museum.

The new building, downtown, opened on June 16, 2007. After one year in its new location the museum saw more than 30,000 visitors. The museum is credited with helping "rejuvenate downtown El Paso."

== Wall of Giants ==
The El Paso Museum of History is part of an annual project, called the Wall of Giants, to honor a person, entity, location or event that has had an ongoing impact on the city. The honoree is chosen by a community group called the Circle of Giants.

- 1st Wall of Giants: Don Haskins and Glory Road.
- 2nd Wall of Giants: Farah Manufacturing Inc.
- 3rd Wall of Giants: El Paso's Mayors.
- 4th Wall of Giants: The Missions and Their People.
- 5th Wall of Giants: University of Texas at El Paso.
- 6th Wall of Giants: Fort Bliss.

== Digital Wall ==
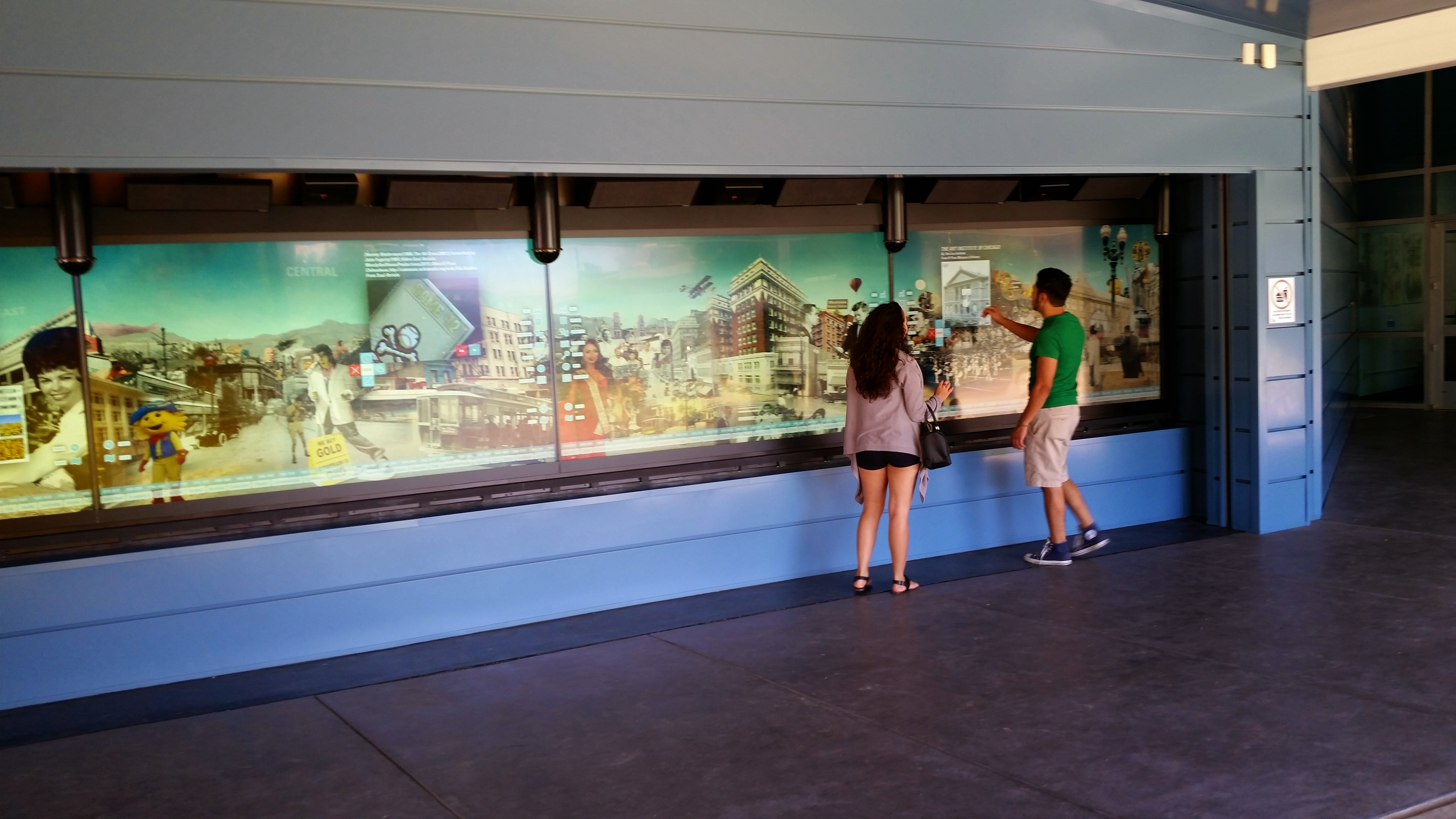
Visitors trying out the Digital Wall (Digie).

The large touchscreen digital wall, known as "Digie" opened on February 14, 2015. It is the second digital wall in the world and the first in the United States. The wall is made of "five massive touch screens" and presents an interactive, three-dimensional view of the history of El Paso, starting in the late 1600s. Each touch-screen is at 95 inch LED. The digital content is networked to other digital walls in other cities. The wall itself is forty feet long by six feet high. There is also a smaller companion wall which is mobile and able to visit schools, malls and community centers. Digie allows visitors to interact with the wall by searching for information or just by browsing the images shown.

Digie stands for Digital Information Gateway in El Paso. Ideas for names for the wall were submitted by community members. El Paso residents, visitors or former residents are invited to share their pictures and videos relating to El Paso with the museum and be shown on Digie. All pictures are screened first by the curator of Digie, Everett Thomas. The wall is not only a place to view pictures and videos, but it also stores and archives these materials.

The digital wall cost around three million dollars to build and was funded by a 2012 bond issue. The idea for the wall dates back to 2011, when Julia Bussinger, the director of the El Paso Museum of History met with the Copenhagen museum director at a conference. The two directors discussed having the next digital wall in El Paso. Copenhagen was the location of the first digital wall of its kind in the world.

== See also ==
- List of museums in West Texas
