= List of museums in Texas =

List of museums located in the state of Texas

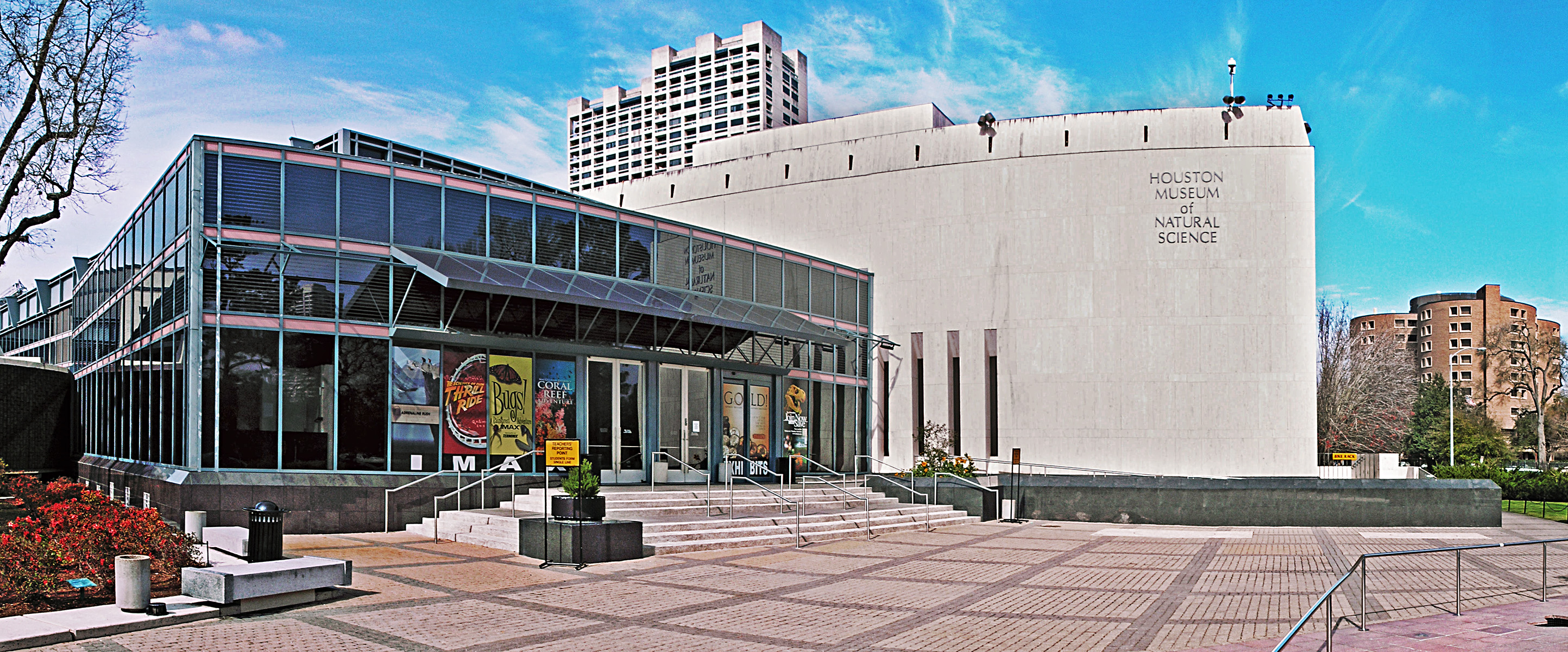
Houston Museum of Natural Science

This list of museums in Texas encompasses museums defined for this context as institutions (including nonprofit organizations, government entities, and private businesses) that collect and care for objects of cultural, artistic, scientific, or historical interest and make their collections or related exhibits available for public viewing. Museums that exist only in cyberspace (i.e., virtual museums) are not included. Also included are non-profit art galleries and exhibit spaces.

Lists of Texas institutions which are not museums are noted in the "See also" section, below.

== Central Texas ==
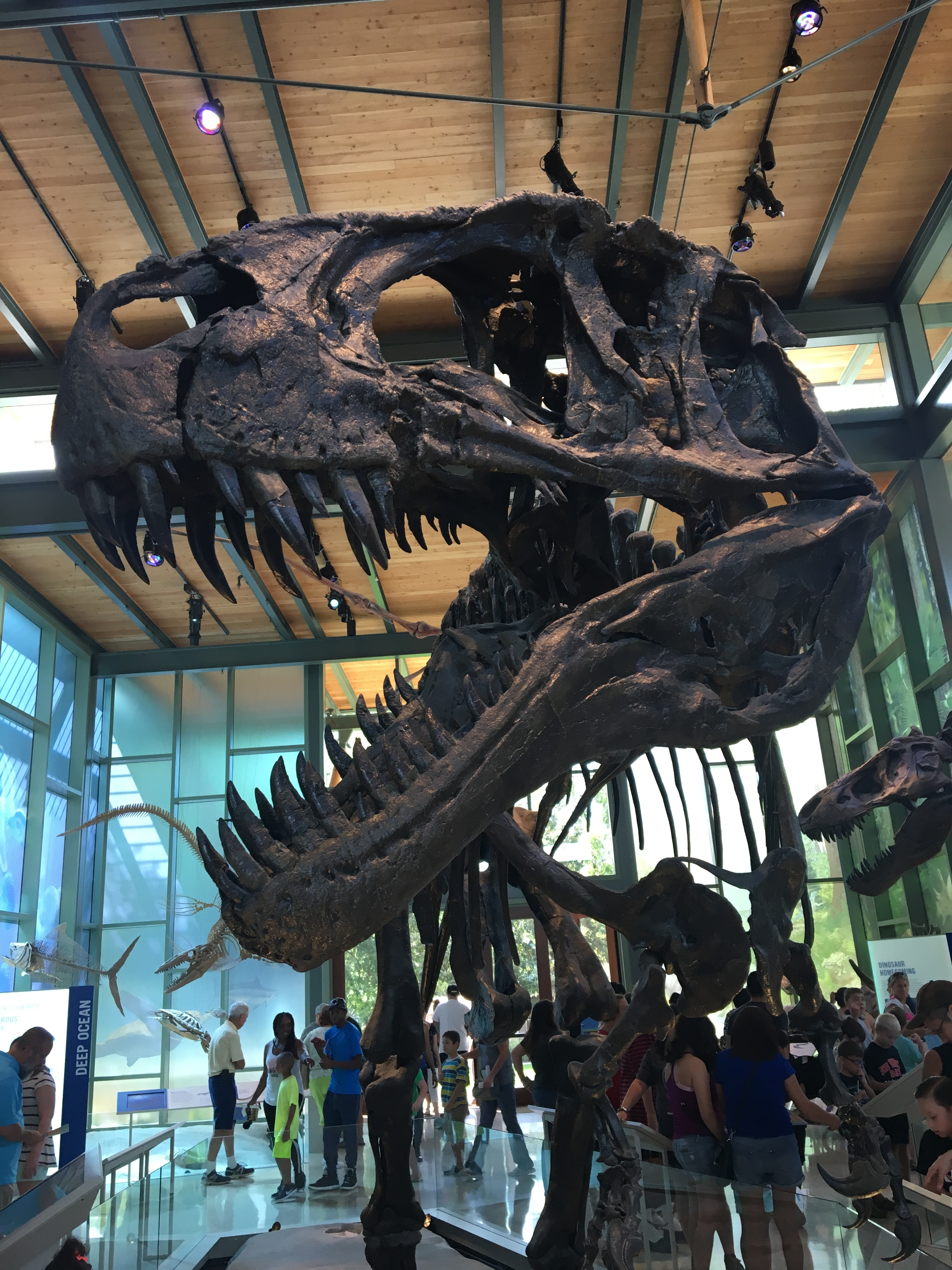
Witte Museum in San Antonio

Includes the cities of Austin, Bryan, Burnet, Fredericksburg, Gonzales, Kerrville, La Grange, New Braunfels, San Antonio, San Marcos, Seguin, Waco, West.

Counties included are Bandera, Bastrop, Bell, Bexar, Blanco, Bosque, Brazos, Burleson, Burnet, Caldwell, Comal, Comanche, Coryell, Falls, Fayette, Freestone, Gillespie, Grimes, Hamilton, Hays, Hill, Kendall, Kerr, Kimble, Lampasas, Lee, Leon, Limestone, Llano, Madison, Mason, McLennan, Milam, Mills, Robertson, San Saba, Travis, Washington, Williamson County, and Wilson.

== East Texas ==
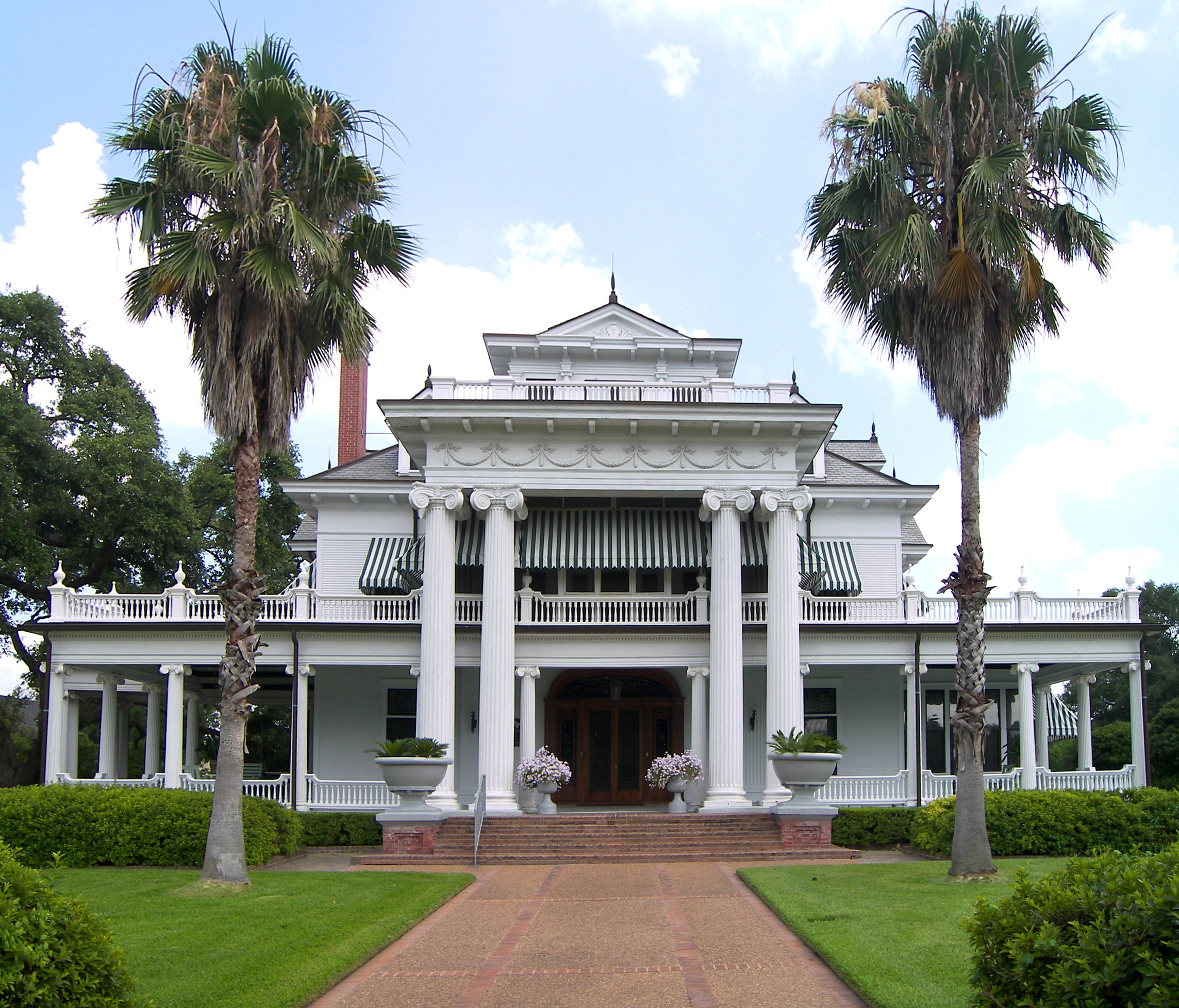
McFaddin-Ward House in Beaumont

Includes the cities of Beaumont, Columbus, Corsicana, Gilmer, Huntsville, Marshall, Mount Vernon, Nacogdoches, Nederland, Orange, Port Arthur, Port Neches, Texarkana, Tyler and Washington-on-the-Brazos.

Counties included are Anderson, Angelina, Bowie, Camp, Cass, Cherokee, Delta, Franklin, Gregg, Hardin, Harrison, Henderson, Hopkins, Houston, Jasper, Jefferson, Lamar, Marion, Morris, Nacogdoches, Newton, Orange, Panola, Polk, Rains, Red River, Rusk, Sabine, San Augustine, San Jacinto, Shelby, Smith, Titus, Trinity, Tyler, Upshur, Van Zandt and Wood.

== North Texas ==
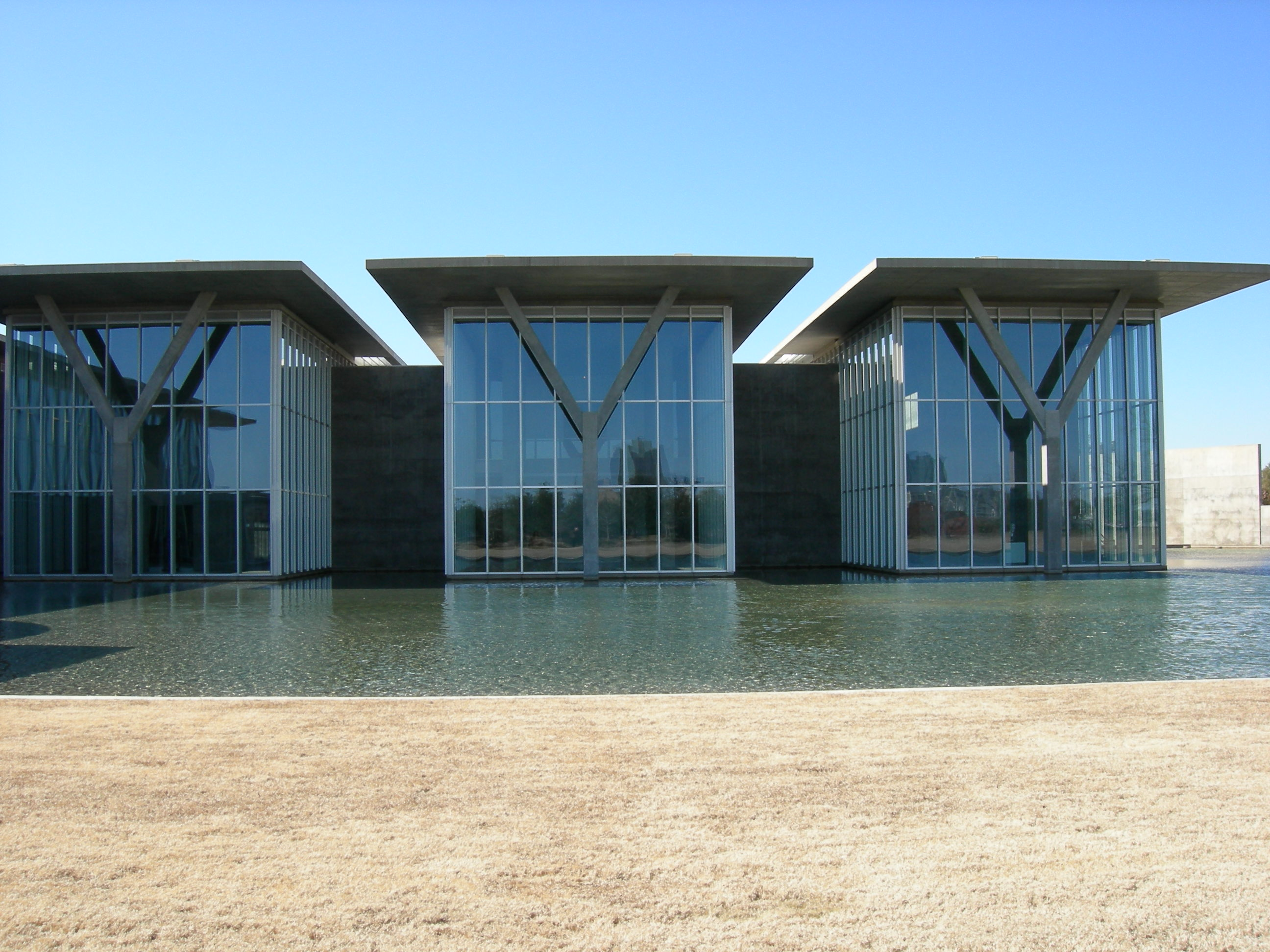
Modern Art Museum of Fort Worth

Includes the cities of Addison, Arlington, Cisco, Dallas, Denison, Denton, Eastland, Fort Worth, Glen Rose, Hillsboro, Irving, McKinney, Paris, Plano, Waxahachie and Wichita Falls.

Counties included are Archer, Baylor, Clay, Collin, Cooke, Cottle, Dallas, Denton, Ellis, Erath, Fannin, Foard, Grayson, Hardeman, Hood, Hunt, Jack, Johnson, Kaufman, Montague, Navarro, Palo Pinto, Parker, Rockwall, Somervell, Tarrant, Wichita, Wilbarger, Wise, and Young.

== South Texas ==
Includes the cities of Alice, Beeville, Brackettville, Cuero, Laredo, Uvalde.

Counties included are Aransas, Atascosa, Bee, Brooks, Calhoun, Cameron, DeWitt, Dimmit, Duval, Edwards, Frio, Goliad, Gonzales, Guadalupe, Hidalgo, Jackson, Jim Hogg, Jim Wells, Karnes, Kenedy, Kinney, Kleberg, La Salle, Lavaca, Live Oak, McMullen, Maverick, Medina, Nueces, Real, Refugio, San Patricio, Starr, Uvalde, Val Verde, Victoria, Webb, Willacy, Zapata and Zavala.

== Texas Gulf Coast ==
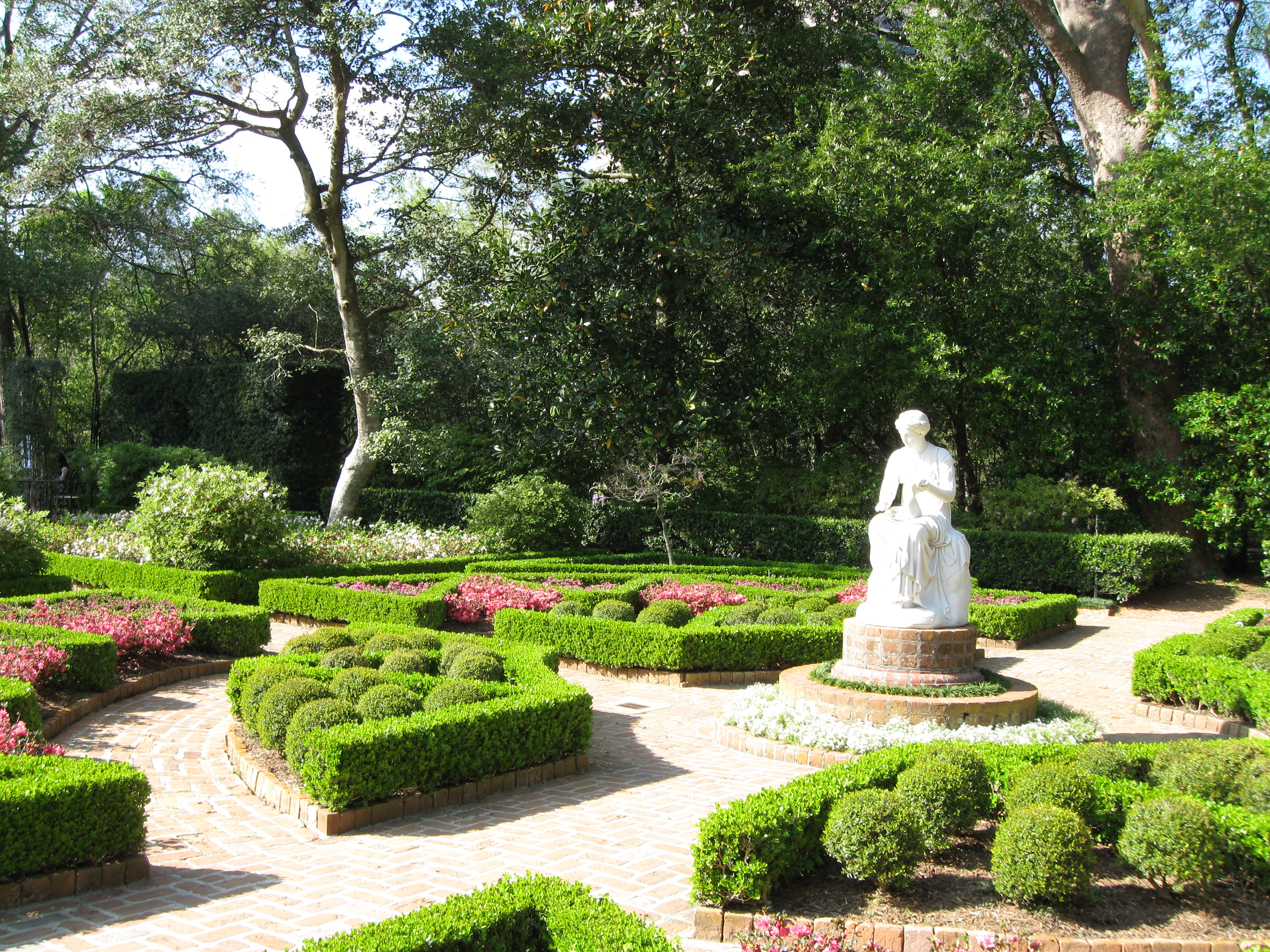
Bayou Bend Collection and Gardens in Houston

Includes the cities of Alvin, Brownsville, Corpus Christi, Galveston, Goliad, Harlingen, Houston, La Porte, Palacios and Victoria.

Counties included are Austin, Brazoria, Chambers, Colorado, Fort Bend, Galveston, Harris, Liberty, Matagorda, Montgomery, Walker, Waller, and Wharton.

== Texas Panhandle ==
Includes the cities of Amarillo, Canyon and Pecos.

Counties included are Armstrong, Briscoe, Carson, Castro, Childress, Collingsworth, Dallam, Deaf Smith, Donley, Gray, Hall, Hansford, Hartley, Hemphill, Hutchinson, Lipscomb, Moore, Ochiltree, Oldham, Parmer, Potter, Randall, Roberts, Sherman, Swisher and Wheeler.

== West Texas ==
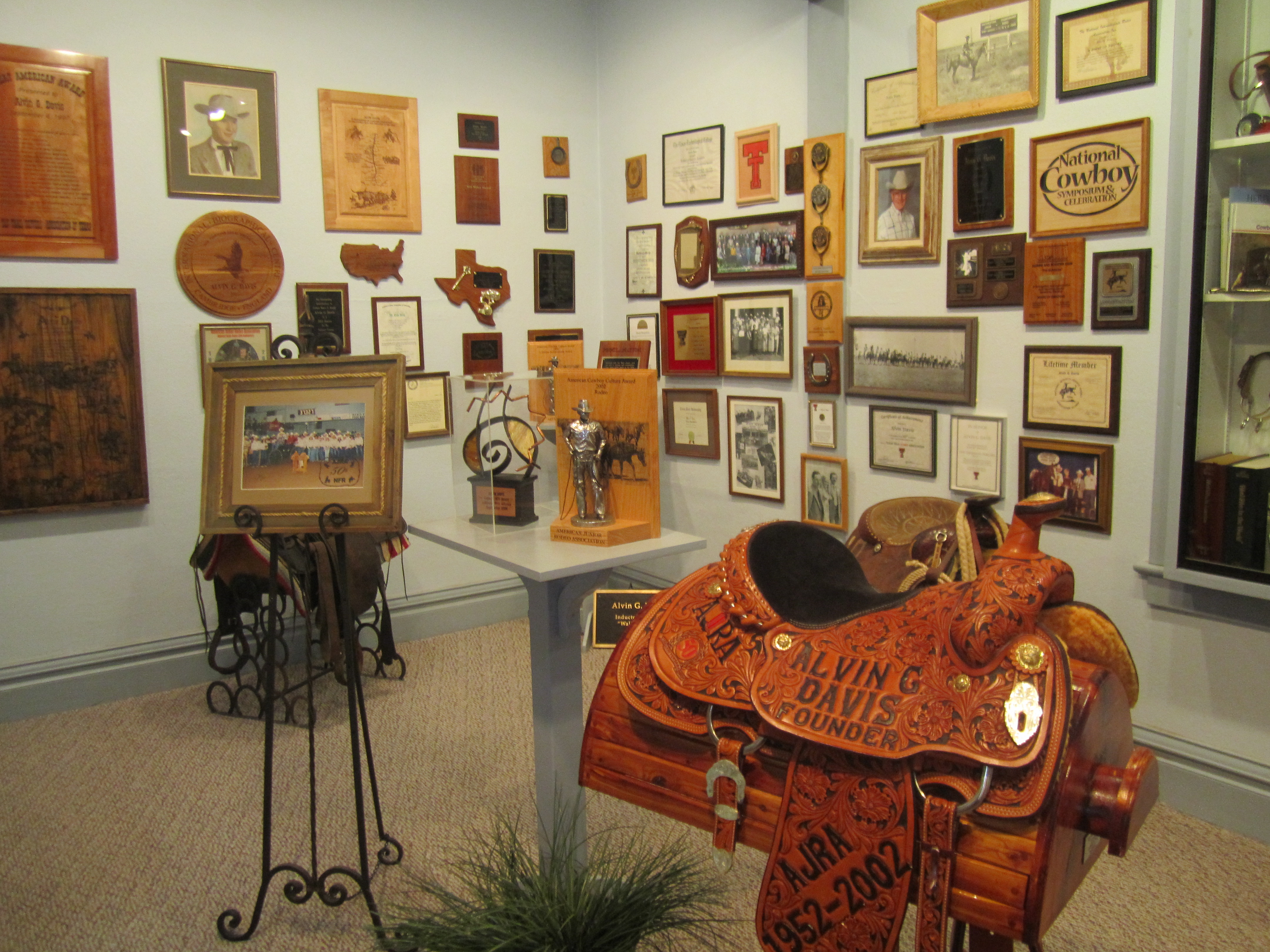
Garza County Historical Museum in Post

Includes the cities of El Paso, Fort Stockton, Midland, Odessa and San Angelo

Counties included are Andrews, Bailey, Borden, Brewster, Brown, Callahan, Cochran, Coke, Coleman, Comanche, Concho, Crane, Crockett, Crosby, Culberson, Dawson, Dickens, Eastland, Ector, El Paso, Fisher, Floyd, Gaines, Garza, Glasscock, Hale, Haskell, Hockley, Howard, Hudspeth, Irion, Jeff Davis, Jones, Kent, Kimble, King, Knox, Lamb, Loving, Lubbock, Lynn, Martin, Mason, McCulloch, Menard, Midland, Mitchell, Motley, Nolan, Pecos, Presidio, Reagan, Reeves, Runnels, Schleicher, Scurry, Shackelford, Stephens, Sterling, Stonewall, Sutton, Taylor, Terrell, Terry, Throckmorton, Tom Green, Upton, Ward, Winkler and Yoakum.

== See also ==
- Historic landmarks in Texas
- List of historical societies in Texas
- Museums list
- List of nature centers in Texas
- Registered Historic Places in Texas
