= Castner Range National Monument =

U.S. national monument in Texas

- IUCN category V (protected landscape/seascape)
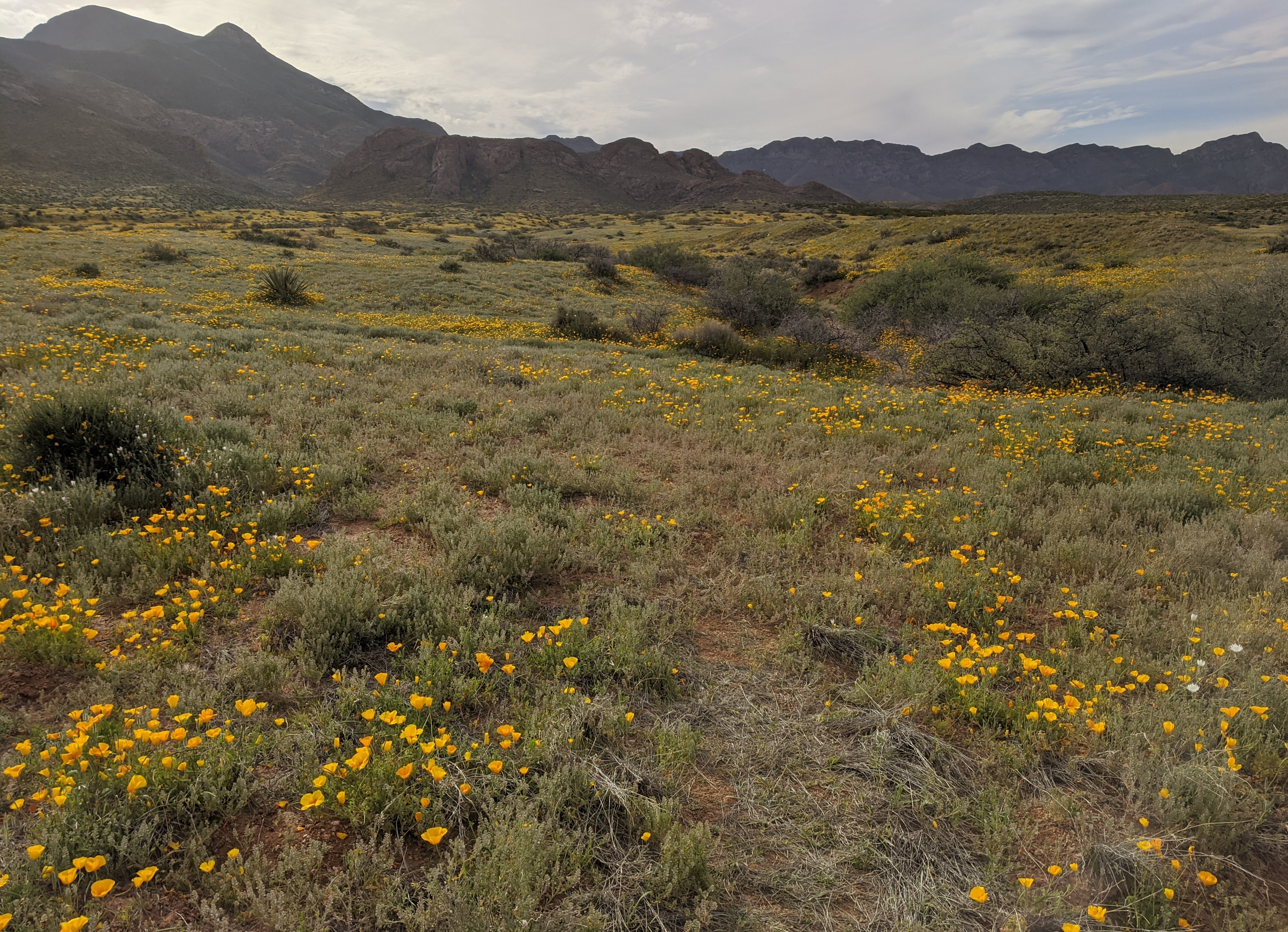
- Castner Range as seen from the El Paso Museum of Archaeology

- Location within Texas Location within the United States
- Interactive map of Castner Range National Monument
- Location: El Paso County, Texas, United States
- Nearest city: El Paso, Texas
- Coordinates: 31°54′N 106°28′W
- Established: March 21, 2023
- Governing body: United States Army

Castner Range National Monument is a national monument in El Paso County, Texas, United States that covers 6,672 acres (27 km^{2}) of the Franklin Mountains. It was established by President Joe Biden on March 21, 2023. The monument, a former weapons testing range, is part of Fort Bliss and is managed by the U.S. Army as the only land conservation national monument within the Department of Defense. The monument includes the eastern slopes of North Franklin Mountain, the highest peak in the area. It is adjacent to Franklin Mountains State Park and Northeast El Paso and near the Organ Mountains–Desert Peaks National Monument in New Mexico. As remediation is ongoing, the site is closed to the public.

== History ==
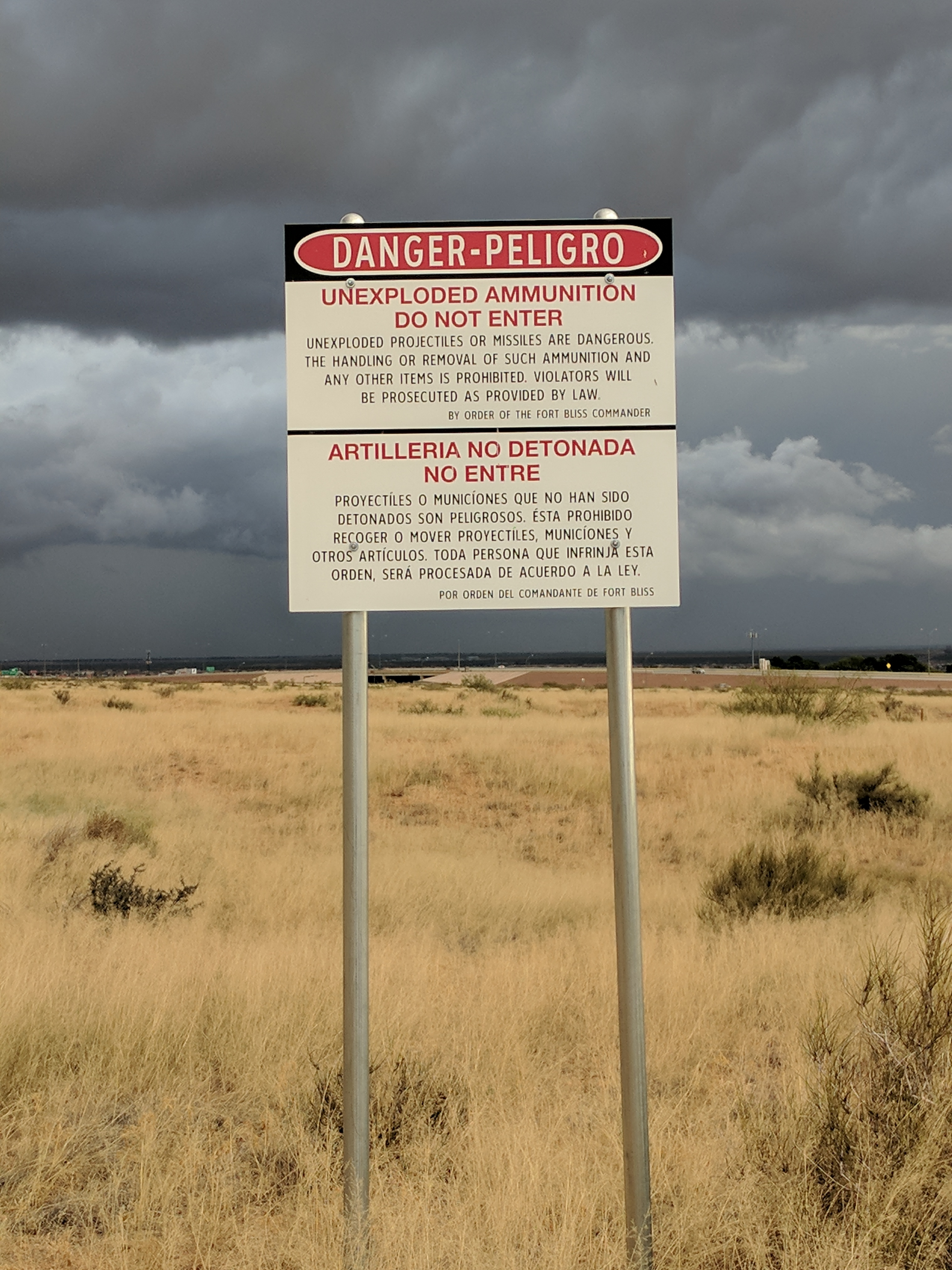
Sign warning of unexploded ammunition at Castner Range National Monument

This area includes 41 archaeological sites that show evidence of human presence dating to 6,000 BC. These include three sites on the National Register of Historic Places: Fusselman Canyon Rock Art District, the Northgate Site, and the Castner Range Archeological District. Artifacts found include rock art, pottery, shelters, burial sites, and bedrock mortars dating from 250 to 1500 AD. The Apache, Puebloans, Comanche, Hopi, and Kiowa Indian peoples have historical connections to the area.

The Castner Range, named in honor of Gen. Joseph Castner, was a weapons test site for the Army beginning in 1926 until its closure in 1966. During World War II, a new air defense missile range became the world's largest. The Anti-Mechanized Target Firing Range provided soldiers experience using anti-tank weapons. After the war, the Army's 1st Guided Missile Brigade trained at the site with new guided missiles, and during the Vietnam War the Army conducted close combat exercises there.

A portion of the range has been transferred for both public and private development, though further development has been blocked by conservation activism.

=== National monument ===
Advocacy for the protection of the mountains had been ongoing for several decades. In 1979 the Texas legislature passed a law allowing Texas Parks and Wildlife Department to accept the land to be incorporated into the newly created Franklin Mountains State Park, but the live munitions at the site prevented its transfer; later efforts to do so were continued to be stymied by remaining unexploded ordnance, as well as a limited parks budget. The 2018 National Defense Authorization Act included a provision that restricted the construction of new roads or buildings.

In 2015, Congressman Beto O'Rourke introduced a bill that would create the Castner Range National Monument. The bill was later reintroduced by Representative Veronica Escobar. The El Paso City Council and El Paso County Commissioners Court both unanimously supported the designation. Secretary of the Interior Deb Haaland visited the Range with Escobar in March 2022 and committed to promote access to nature.

President Biden announced the establishment of the monument at the White House Conservation in Action Summit on March 21, 2023, along with Avi Kwa Ame National Monument as part of the administration's 30 by 30 conservation goals.

The site is still undergoing remediation of live munitions and ordnance pursuant to the Comprehensive Environmental Response, Compensation, and Liability (Superfund) Act and therefore is not accessible to the public. Only a small portion of the area has been fully surveyed with estimates suggesting more than 4,800 undiscovered munitions remain. After phases of cleanup, the monument will be developed with trails for hiking or biking. The El Paso Museum of Archeology and National Border Patrol Museum are on Woodrow Bean Transmountain Drive which runs through the monument, and their 17-acre city-owned property (6.9 ha) with a short nature trail is the only non-vehicular access to the area, though not within the federal boundaries.

== Ecology and geology ==
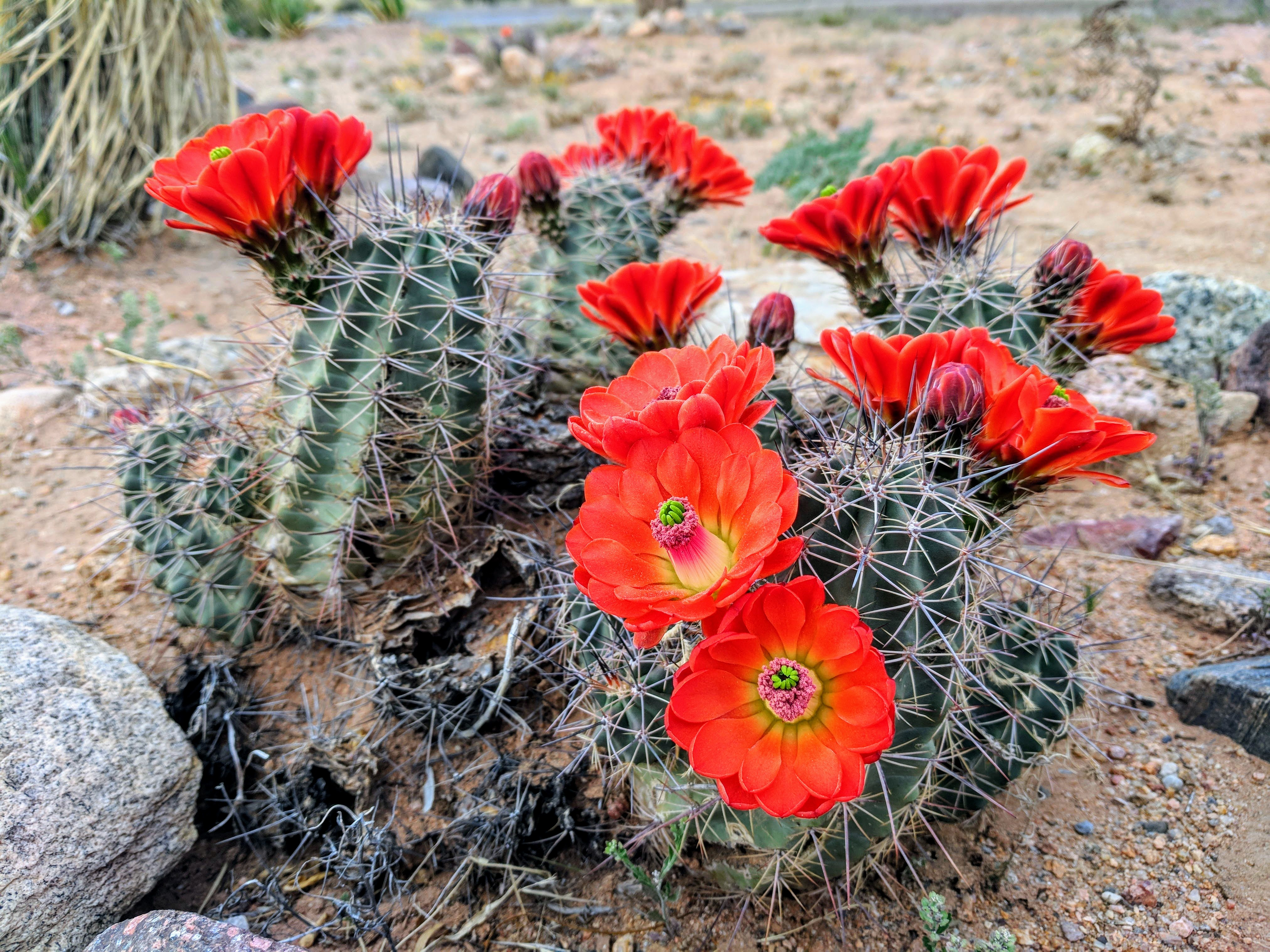
Claret cup cactus in bloom at the El Paso Museum of Archaeology

The Castner Range is part of the Chihuahuan Desert. The Mexican gold poppy blooms across the site in the spring.

Animals that live in the Franklin Mountains include the mountain plover, Texas horned lizard, western burrowing owl, and Franklin Mountain talus snail.

Native plants include the Alamo beard tongue, Sneed's pincushion cactus, and night-blooming cereus.

The Franklin Mountains have an unconformity between older Red Bluff granite and new Bliss Formation sandstone. A formation of Castner Marble in the foothills has fossilized algae from the Precambrian period. The Castner Range has the Franklin Mountains' only undeveloped alluvial fans extending from their canyons.

== See also ==
- List of national monuments of the United States
- Fort Ord National Monument, another conservation area requiring remediation of unexploded ordnance
