= National Border Patrol Museum =

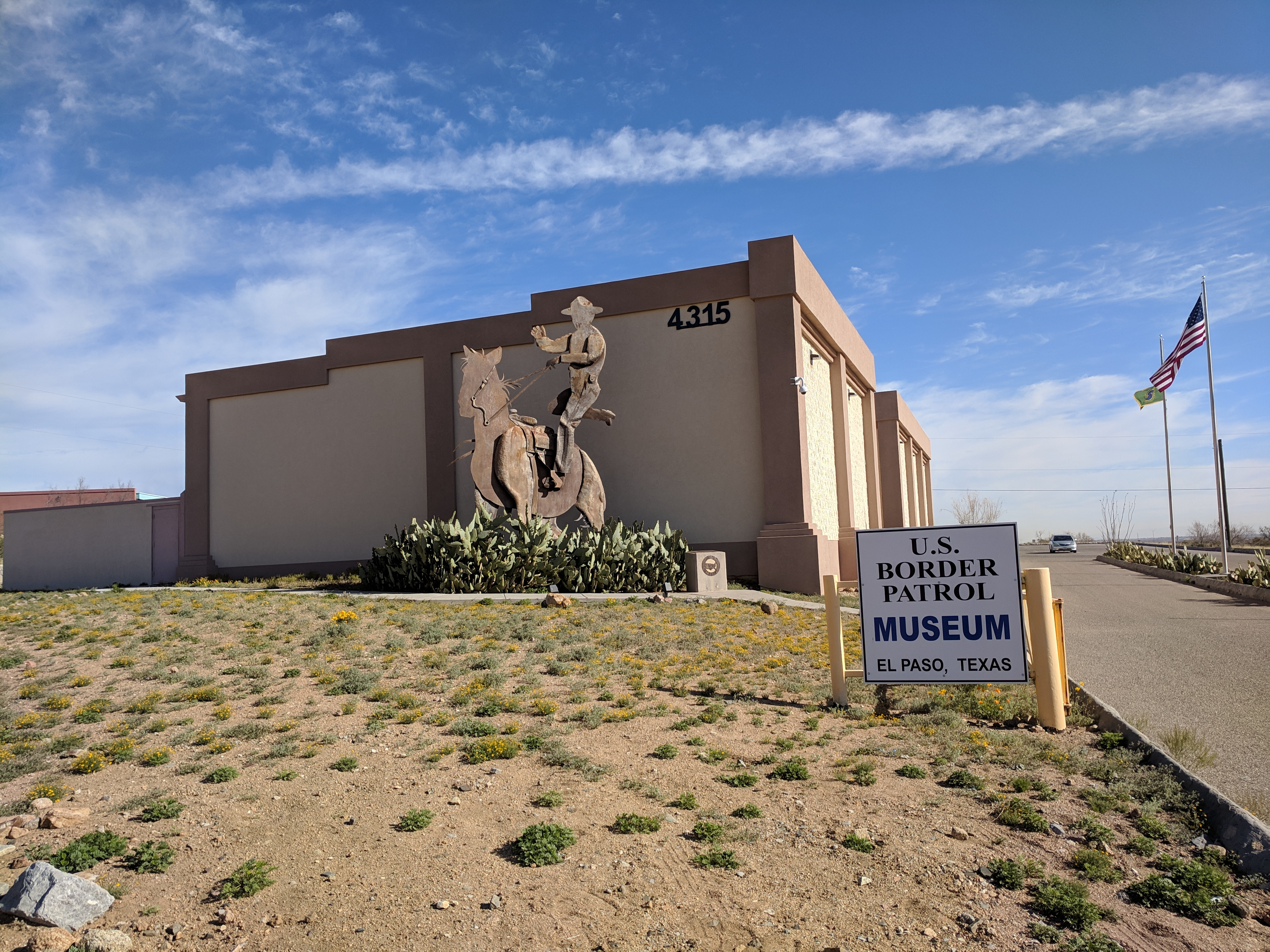

- Location within Texas
- Established: 1980; 46 years ago
- Location: 4315 Woodrow Bean Transmountain Drive; El Paso, Texas, U.S.
- Coordinates: 31.898804°N 106.440842°W
- Type: 501(c)(3) nonprofit organization
- Director: Samantha Winer
- Chairpersons: Michael L. Underdown, Board of Trustees; Robert Boatright, Board of Governors
- Owners: Border Patrol Museum and Memorial Library Foundation
- Website: borderpatrolmuseum.com

The National Border Patrol Museum is a museum dedicated to educating the public about the history of the U.S. Border Patrol.

== Description ==
It is the only museum with the U.S. Border Patrol as its sole focus; its artifacts cover the agency's entire history. Among the exhibits are weapons and vehicles used by the agency, including helicopters. There is a Border Patrol dog exhibit, an art exhibit, and a display of officer badges. also depicted are various methods individuals have used to cross the border between Mexico and the United States.

The museum employs six people and has fifteen volunteers. its revenue comes from charitable contributions, membership payments, inventory sales, and interest income.

The museum is adjacent to the El Paso Museum of Archaeology at the base of the Franklin Mountains, surrounded by the Castner Range National Monument.

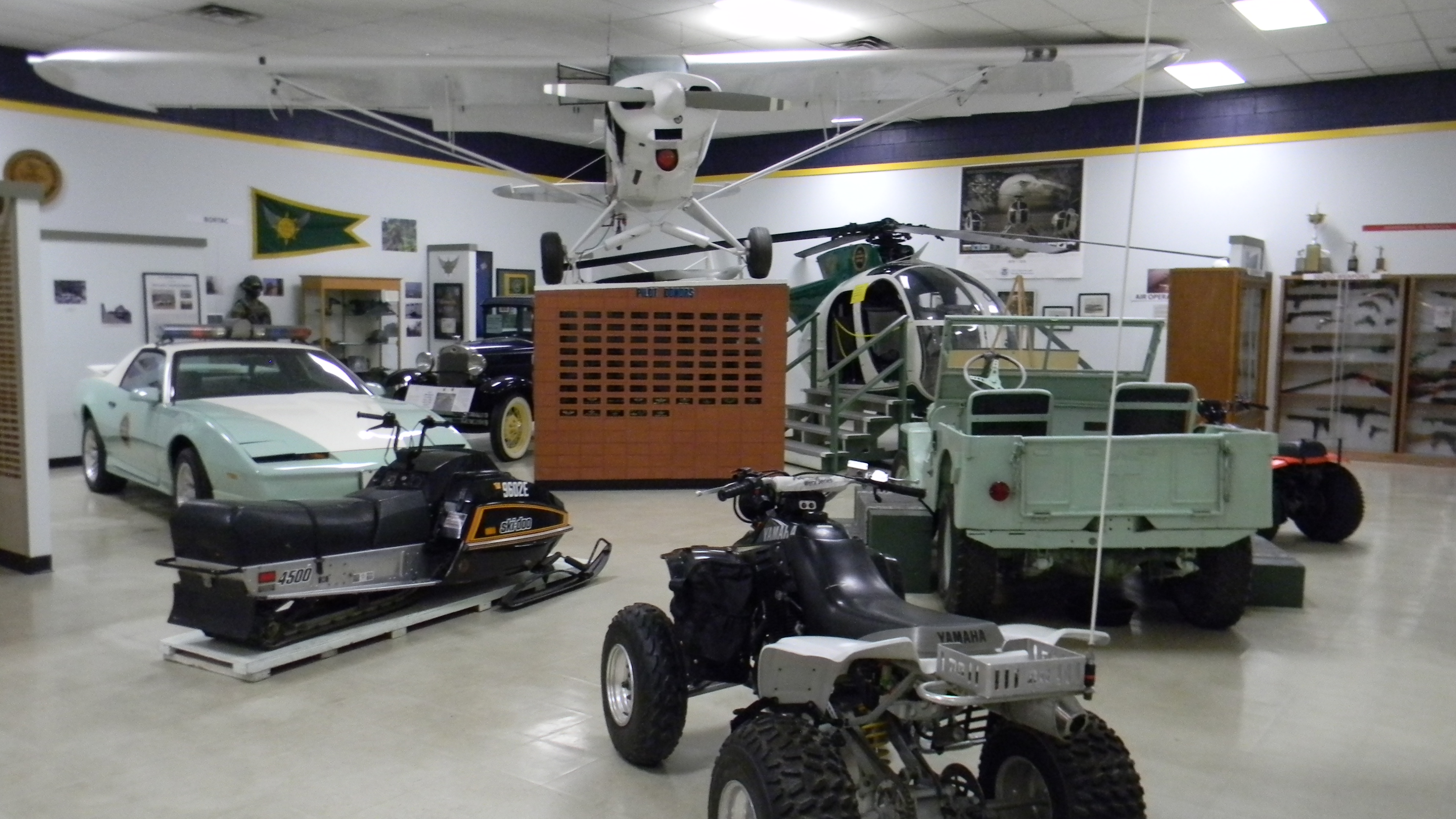

== History ==
The museum was established by a 1979 vote of the Fraternal Order of Retired Border Patrol Officers. The state of Texas issued its certificate of incorporation in 1980, and the Internal Revenue Service recognized it as a tax-exempt 501(c)(3) nonprofit organization. Its original location from 1985 to 1992 was the Cortez Building in El Paso. From 1992 to 1994, museum artifacts were in storage awaiting construction of a new building. The current 10,000 square feet (930 m^{2}) space opened its doors in 1994, and it is located on 2 acres (0.81 ha; 0.0031 sq mi) of land in the Castner Range National Monument.

In 2019, protesters wheatpasted photos of individuals harmed by the Border Patrol over exhibitions honoring the fallen officers of the Border Patrol.

== See also ==
- List of museums in West Texas
