= List of museums in West Texas =

This article was split from List of museums in Texas

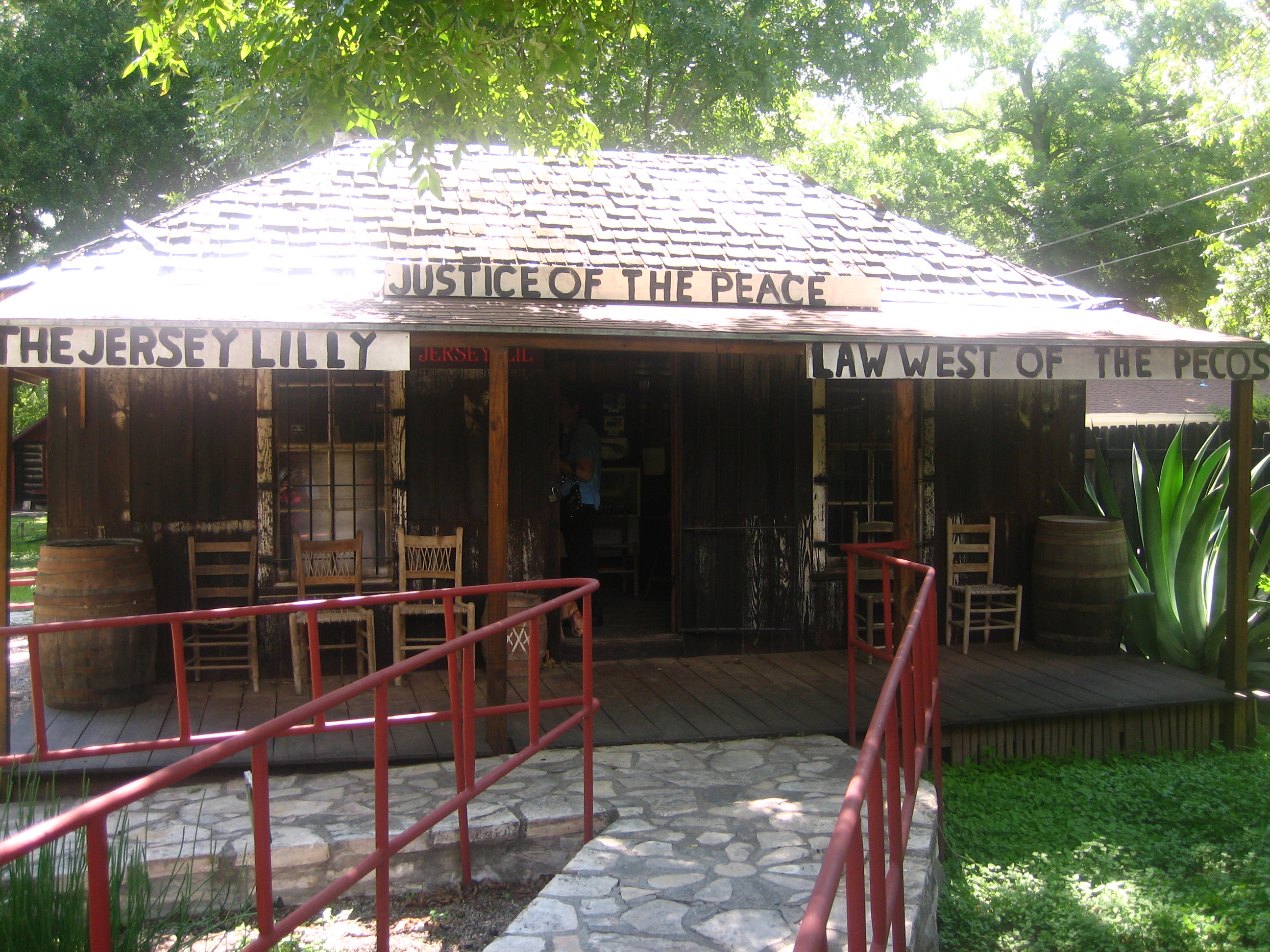
Replica of Judge Roy Bean office

The list of museums in West Texas encompasses museums defined for this context as institutions (including nonprofit organizations, government entities, and private businesses) that collect and care for objects of cultural, artistic, scientific, or historical interest and make their collections or related exhibits available for public viewing. Included are nonprofit art galleries and exhibit spaces. Museums that exist only in cyberspace (i.e., virtual museums) are not included.

== West Texas ==
West Texas is a vernacular term applied to a region in the southwestern quadrant of the United States that primarily encompasses the arid and semiarid lands in the western portion of the state of Texas.

The counties included are Andrews, Bailey, Borden, Brewster, Brown, Callahan, Cochran, Coke, Coleman, Concho, Crane, Crockett, Crosby, Culberson, Dawson, Dickens, Eastland, Ector, El Paso, Fisher, Floyd, Gaines, Garza, Glasscock, Hale, Haskell, Hockley, Howard, Hudspeth, Irion, Jeff Davis, Jones, Kent, Kimble, King, Knox, Lamb, Loving, Lubbock, Lynn, Martin, Mason, McCulloch, Menard, Midland, Mitchell, Motley, Nolan, Pecos, Presidio, Reagan, Reeves, Runnels, Schleicher, Scurry, Shackelford, Stephens, Sterling, Stonewall, Sutton, Taylor, Terrell, Terry, Throckmorton, Tom Green, Upton, Ward, Winkler, and Yoakum.

== Museums in West Texas, listed by county ==
=== Andrews - Brown ===
List of museums in Andrews - Brown counties, Texas
Museum name	Image	City	County	Notes	Refs
Muleshoe Heritage Center	Muleshoe Heritage Center	Muleshoe	Bailey	Ranch house, the ranch cookhouse and bunkhouse and a log cabin	
Borden County Museum	Borden County Museum in Gail	Gail	Borden	Local history	
Barton Warnock Visitor Center		Brewster	Brewster	Big Bend National Park	
Big Bend National Park Visitor Centers		Brewster	Brewster	Big Bend National Park	
Hallie Stillwell Hall of Fame Museum		Marathon	Brewster	Life of Texas woman rancher Hallie Stillwell, member of the Texas Women's Hall of Fame	
Museum of the Big Bend		Alpine	Brewster	Part of Sul Ross State University, history and cultural heritage of the Big Bend area	
Blanket Historical Museum		Blanket	Brown	Artifacts, memorabilia, family history research center	
Brown County Museum of History		Brownwood	Brown	Recorded Texas Historic Landmark, National Register of Historic Places	
Martin & Frances Lehnis Railroad Museum and Visitor Center		Brownwood	Brown	Railroad	

=== Callahan - Dickens ===
List of museums in Callahan - Dickens counties, Texas
Museum name	Image	City	County	Notes	Refs
Baird Texas T & P Depot Museum		Baird	Callahan		
Callahan County Pioneer Museum		Baird	Callahan	Located in the basement of the Callahan County courthouse	
Robert E. Howard Museum	Robert E. Howard Museum Front Gate	Cross Plains	Callahan	Home of and museum about Robert E. Howard, author of Conan the Barbarian, NRHP	
Woody's Classic Cars and Baseball Museum		Cross Plains	Callahan		
Texas Last Frontier Museum		Morton	Cochran	Housed in the 1957 Masonic Temple	
Whiteface Museum		Whiteface	Cochran	Housed in the 1926 Whiteface Hotel, featurers local history	
Fort Chadbourne		Bronte	Coke	Restored and ruins of the mid 19th-century frontier fort that was also a stage stop on the Butterfield Overland Mail, visitor center with artifacts	
Earnest and Dorothy Barrow Foundation Museum		Eola	Concho	Local history	
Don Freeman Memorial Museum	Don Freeman Memorial Museum in Eden	Eden	Concho	Local history	
Museum of the Desert Southwest	Museum of the Desert Southwest	Crane	Crane	Local history exhibits	
Crockett County Museum	Crockett County Museum	Ozona	Crockett	American West period displays, local and regional history	
Fort Lancaster	Fort Lancaster	Sheffield	Crockett	Recorded Texas Historic Landmark, National Register of Historic Places, Texas State Antiquities Landmark	
Crosby County Pioneer Museum		Crosbyton	Crosby	Local history	
Mt. Blanco Fossil Museum		Crosbyton	Crosby	creationism	
Ralls Historical Museum		Ralls	Crosby	Recorded Texas Historic Landmark	
Clark Hotel Museum		Van Horn	Culberson	AKA Culbertson County Museum, Recorded Texas Historic Landmark, National Register of Historic Places	
Frijole Ranch Museum		Salt Flat	Culberson	National Register of Historic Places	
Dal Paso Museum		Lamesa	Dawson	Local history exhibits	
Spur-Dickens County Museum		Spur, Texas	Dickens	Local history	

=== Eastland - Ector ===
List of museums in Eastland and Ector counties, Texas
Museum name	Image	City	County	Notes	Refs
Austin McCloud Appellate Court Museum		Eastland	Eastland	Named for area chief justice	
Conrad Hilton Center and Museum		Cisco	Eastland	Recorded Texas Historic Landmark, National Register of Historic Places. Located in the Mobley Hotel, the first hotel bought by Conrad Hilton	
Eastland County Museum		Eastland	Eastland	Local history	
Lela Latch Lloyd Museum		Cisco	Eastland	Located in the 1915 city hall, historical artifacts	
Ellen Noël Art Museum	Ellen Noel Art Museum	Odessa	Ector	Eclectic American artcollection from 1860 to the present	
Odessa Meteor Crater	Odessa Meteor Crater Museum	Odessa	Ector	Impact crater and museum	
Parker House Ranching Museum	Parker Ranch House Museum	Odessa	Ector	Mid 20th-century period ranching family house	
Presidential Museum and Leadership Library	Presidential Museum and Leadership Library	Odessa	Ector	History of the American Presidency, including presidents, vice presidents, First Ladies, candidates, campaigns	
White-Pool House	Organ at White-Pool House	Odessa	Ector	National Register of Historic Places Listings, state antiquities landmark. Built by Indiana immigrant Charles White who helped establish the first county government	

=== El Paso County ===
List of museums in El Paso County, Texas
Museum name	Image	City	County	Notes	Refs
1st Armored Division and Fort Bliss Museum		El Paso	El Paso		
Casasola Museum/Museo Casasola		El Paso	El Paso	History of the US-México relationship	
Centennial Museum and Chihuahuan Desert Gardens	Chihuahuan desert garden	El Paso	El Paso	Part of the University of Texas at El Paso, regional cultural and natural history	
Chamizal National Memorial	Chamizal visitor center	El Paso	El Paso	Includes a history museum and three art galleries	
El Paso County Historical Society Museum		El Paso	El Paso		
El Paso Holocaust Museum and Study Center		El Paso	El Paso	Holocaust	
El Paso Museum of Archaeology	El Paso Museum of Archaeology	El Paso	El Paso	Prehistory and culture of the El Paso area and the Southwest	
El Paso Museum of Art	Giovanni di Paolo St. John the Evangelist, the Assumption of the Virgin and St. Ansaus	El Paso	El Paso	Art	
El Paso Museum of History	El Paso Museum of History	El Paso	El Paso	History and culture	
Fort Bliss and Old Ironsides Museum		Fort Bliss	El Paso	Military history from 1849 forward	
International Museum of Art		El Paso	El Paso	Located in the Turney home	
Hueco Tanks State Park and Historic Site		El Paso	El Paso		
Lynx Exhibits		El Paso	El Paso	Privately owned traveling exhibitions	
Magoffin Home State Historic Site	Magoffin Homestead	El Paso	El Paso	Recorded Texas Historic Landmark, National Register of Historic Places	
National Border Patrol Museum		El Paso	El Paso	Law enforcement	
Noncommissioned Officer Heritage And Education Center		Fort Bliss	El Paso	US Army non-commissioned officer 1775 to present	
Old El Paso County Jail Museum		El Paso	El Paso		
Old Fort Bliss Replica Cultural Center		Fort Bliss	El Paso	Military	
Portales Museum and Visitors Information Center		El Paso	El Paso	Recorded Texas Historic Landmark	
Railroad and Transportation Museum of El Paso		El Paso	El Paso	How transportation enhanced the development of business and industry in the region	
Stanlee and Gerald Rubin Center for the Visual Arts		El Paso	El Paso	Part of the University of Texas at El Paso	
TecH2O Center		El Paso	El Paso	Water management in the Chihuahuan Desert	
UTEP Heritage House		El Paso	El Paso	Historical repository of University of Texas at El Paso	
Veterans Memorial Museum & Memorial Walk		San Elizario	El Paso	The Los Portales Museum and Visitors Center	
Ysleta del Sur Pueblo Cultural Center Museum		El Paso	El Paso	Native American inter-active experience	

=== Floyd - Knox ===
List of museums in Floyd - Knox counties, Texas
Museum name	Image	City	County	Notes	Refs
Floyd County Museum		Floydada	Floyd	Artifacts from the 1540 Coronado Expedition	
Gaines County Museum		Seminole	Gaines	Local history	
Seagraves-Loop Museum and Art Center		Seagraves	Gaines	Recorded Texas Historic Landmark	
Garza County Historical Museum	Alvin G. Davis Rodeo Room, Garza Museum	Post	Garza	Recorded Texas Historic Landmark, National Register of Historic Places. Ranch, cowboy, Indian, and pioneer artifacts. Formerly a medical facility	
OS Ranch Museum	Easter exhibit at OS Museum	Post	Garza	Artwork of Texas, the American West, and Asia, in a house built for C. W. Post who later founded Post cereals	
Jimmy Dean and Llano Estacado Museum		Plainview	Hale	On the campus of Wayland Baptist University	
Malouf Abraham Family Art Center		Plainview	Hale	Wayland Baptist University	
Hale County Farm and Ranch Museum		Post	Hale	Antique farm machinery, windmills, a depot and caboose	
Hangar 25 Air Museum		Big Spring	Howard	Historic aircraft from World War II and the Big Spring Army Air Forces Bombardier School, history of Webb Air Force Base	
Heritage Museum of Big Spring	RCA exhibit at Heritage Museum	Big Spring	Howard	Area artifacts and memorabilia	
Potton House		Big Spring	Howard	National Register of Historic Places	
Hudspeth County Railroad Depot Museum		Sierra Blanca	Hudspeth	Railroad and local history displays, operated by the Hudspeth County Historical Society	
Fort Davis National Historic Site	Fort Davis National Historic Site	Fort Davis	Jeff Davis	National Register of Historic Places	
Overland Trail Museum		Fort Davis	Jeff Davis	Early life in the old West, operated by the Fort Davis Historical Society	
Anson-Jones Museum		Anson	Jones	Local history	
Cowboy Country Museum		Stamford	Jones	Ranching heritage	
Wichita – Brazos Museum and Cultural Center		Benjamin	Knox	Barbed-wire collection and settlement memorabilia	

=== Lamb - Lynn ===
List of museums in Lamb - Lynn counties, Texas
Museum name	Image	City	County	Notes	Refs
Littlefield Lands Duggan House Museum	Littlefield Lands-Duggan House Museum	Littlefield	Lamb	Local history	
Sand Crawl Museum		Olton	Lamb	Local history	
American Wind Power Center	Windmills at American Wind Power Center in Lubbock	Lubbock	Lubbock	American-style windmills	
Buddy Holly Center	Buddy Holly Center in Lubbock	Lubbock	Lubbock	Visual arts exhibits, history and legacy of musician Buddy Holly	
FiberMax Center for Discovery		Lubbock	Lubbock	Non-profit, American agriculture	
Lubbock Lake Landmark		Lubbock	Lubbock	Archeological site. Recorded Texas Historic Landmark, National Register of Historic Places	
Museum of Texas Tech University	Museum of Texas Tech University	Lubbock	Lubbock	Natural history, cultural history, art	
National College Baseball Hall of Fame		Lubbock	Lubbock	History of college baseball	
National Ranching Heritage Center	Windmill at National Ranching Heritage Center	Lubbock	Lubbock	Ranching history and art, park with 38 ranch structures and steer statues	
Science Spectrum		Lubbock	Lubbock	Hands-on science and technology interactive exhibits, aquarium	
Silent Wings Museum	Silent Wings Museum Tile Mosaic	Lubbock	Lubbock	World War II weaponry and transport,	
Slaton Museum	Slaton Museum	Slaton	Lubbock	Local history	
Texas Air Museum		Slaton	Lubbock	Restored historic aircraft, military jets, transport vehicles	
Louise Hopkins Underwood Center for the Arts		Lubbock	Lubbock	Visual and performing arts, includes four galleries	
O'Donnell Heritage Museum	Dan Blocker Room at O'Donnell, TX, Heritage Museum	O'Donnell	Lynn	Local history, including actor Dan Blocker memorabilia	

=== Martin - Nolan ===
List of museums in Martin - Nolan counties, Texas
Museum name	Image	City	County	Notes	Refs
Martin County Historical Museum		Stanton	Martin	Exhibits include farms, ranches, schools and local businesses	
Heart of Texas Country Music Museum	Heart of Texas Country Music Museum	Brady	McCullough	Recorded Texas Historic Landmark, history and memorabilia of country music artists	
McCulloch County Courthouse	McCulloch County Courthouse	Brady	McCullough	State antiquities landmark	
Heart of Texas Historical Museum	Heart of Texas Historical Museum	Brady	McCullough	Recorded Texas Historic Landmark	
Fort McKavett State Historic Site	Fort McKavett State Historic Site	Menard	Menard	Recorded Texas Historic Landmark	
Heart of West Texas Museum		Colorado City	Mitchell	Recorded Texas Historic Landmark	
Brown-Dorsey Medallion Home		Midland	Midland	Late 19th-century period Victorian home, open by appointment with the Midland County Historical Society	
George W. Bush Childhood Home	George W. Bush Childhood Home	Midland	Midland	Recorded Texas Historic Landmark, National Register of Historic Places	
Haley Memorial Library & History Center		Midland	Midland	Changing exhibits of Western art and history from its collections	
McCormick Gallery at Midland College		Midland	Midland	Art	
Midland Army Air Field Museum		Midland	Midland	World War II aviation culture and history	
Midland County History Museum		Midland	Midland	Local history	
Midland Downtown Lions Club Fire Museum		Midland	Midland	Firefighting uniforms, equipment, vehicles	
Museum of the Southwest		Midland	Midland	National Register of Historic Places	
Permian Basin Petroleum Museum	Permian Basin Petroleum Museum	Midland	Midland	Petroleum exploration, equipment, industry, geology, art by Tom Lovell, Chaparral cars	
Scarborough-Lineberry House		Midland	Midland	Early 20th-century house, owned by the City	
Motley County Historical Museum	Diorama at Motley County, TX Historical Museum	Matador	Motley	Local history located in a former hospital	
National WASP WWII Museum		Sweetwater	Nolan	History of the Women Airforce Service Pilots, World War II American female aviators	
Pioneer Museum	R A Ragland House Pioneer Museum	Sweetwater	Nolan	Local history	

=== Pecos - Runnels ===
List of museums in Pecos - Runnels counties, Texas
Museum name	Image	City	County	Note	Refs
Alley Oop Park Museum		Iraan	Pecos	Birthplace of Alley Oop comic strip	
Annie Riggs Memorial Museum	Annie Riggs Memorial Museum	Fort Stockton	Pecos	Recorded Texas Historic Landmark, National Register of Historic Place	
Historic Fort Stockton		Fort Stockton	Pecos	Recorded Texas Historic Landmark, National Register of Historic Places	
Old Pecos County Jail		Fort Stockton	Pecos	Prison	
West of the Pecos Museum		Pecos	Reeves	Recorded Texas Historic Landmark, multiple displays of the Old West	
Chinati Foundation		Marfa	Presidio	Contemporary art and sculpture	
Fort Leaton State Historic Site	Fort Leaton State Historic Site	Presidio	Presidio	National Register of Historic Places, archaeological and natural history	
Giant 1956 film Museum at the Hotel Paisano		Marfa	Presidio	Memorabilia of the 1956 film Giant that was filmed in town	
Marfa and Presidio County Museum		Marfa	Presidio	Recorded Texas Historic Landmark	
Hickman Museum		Big Lake	Reagan	Local history	
Z.I. Hale Museum / Rock Hotel Heritage Center		Winters	Runnels	Local history	

=== Schleicher - Sutton ===
List of museums in Schleicher - Sutton counties
Museum name	Image	City	County	Notes	Refs
Schleicher County Historical Museum		Eldorado	Schleicher	Local history	
Old Jail Art Center	Old Jail Art Center	Albany	Shackelford	Art, National Register of Historic Places	
Breckenridge Aviation Museum		Breckenridge	Stephens	Aviation	
Breckenridge Fine Arts Center		Breckenridge	Stephens	Art	
Flying A's Classic Car Club Museum		Albany	Shackelford	Classic automobiles and memorabilia	
Fort Griffin State Historic Site	Fort Griffin State Historic Site	Albany	Shackelford	Fort ruins, visitor center displays about the mid 19th-century cavalry fort	
Scurry County Museum		Snyder	Scurry	County history, also art exhibits	
Swenson Memorial Museum	Swenson Memorial Museum	Breckenridge	Stephens	Recorded Texas Historic Landmark	
Miers Home Museum		Sonora	Sutton	Late 19th-century house, operated by the Sutton County Historical Society	
Old Sonora Ice House Ranch Museum		Sonora	Sutton	Housed in a former ice house, operated by the Sutton County Historical Society, exhibits includes pioneer, ranching, lawmen and outlaws, area history, transportation, model train layout	

=== Taylor - Terry ===
List of museums in Taylor - Terry counties, Texas
Museum name	Image	City	County	Notes	Refs
12th Armored Division Memorial Museum	12th Armored Division Memorial Museum	Abilene	Taylor	History of the 12th Armored Division in World War II	
Center for Contemporary Arts		Abilene	Taylor	Four galleries	
Big Country Athletic Hall of Fame Museum		Abilene	Taylor		
Fort Phantom Hill	Fort Phantom Hill Entrance	Abilene	Taylor		
Amy Graves Ryan Fine Arts Gallery		Abilene	Taylor	Part of McMurry University	
Merkel Area Historical Museum		Merkel	Taylor		
Buffalo Gap Historic Village	Buffalo Gap Historic Village	Buffalo Gap	Taylor	Historic Western village	
Cockerell Galleries		Abilene	Taylor	Art, operated by Abilene Christian University	
Dyess Heritage Museum, Memorial Park and Linear Air Park		Abilene	Taylor	Located at Dyess Air Force Base, includes outdoor display of historic aircraft, museum about the base's history	
Frontier Texas!		Abilene	Taylor	American West interactive simulations	
The Grace Museum	Grace Museum, Abilene, TX	Abilene	Taylor	Art, local history, and children's museum	
Ira M. Taylor Memorial Gallery		Abilene	Taylor	Part of Hardin–Simmons University	
National Center for Children's Illustrated Literature		Abilene	Taylor	Exhibitions of art from children's books	
Taylor County History Center		Buffalo Gap	Taylor	Historic village	
Terrell County Memorial Museum		Sanderson	Terrell	"Cactus Capitol of Texas"	
Terry County Heritage Museum		Brownfield	Terry	Recorded Texas Historic Landmark	
Meadow Museum		Meadow	Terry	Local history, with special display on Meadow native Sonny Curtis	

=== Tom Green - Yoakim ===
List of museums in Tom Green - Yoakim counties, Texas
Museum name	Image	City	County	Notes	Refs
Angelo State University Art Gallery		San Angelo	Tom Green	Carr Education-Fine Arts Building	
E. H. Danner Museum of Telephony	Danner Museum Fort Concho	San Angelo	Tom Green	Recorded Texas Historic Landmark, National Register of Historic Place Technology, located at Fort Concho	
Fort Concho	Fort Concho visitors center	San Angelo	Tom Green	National Historic Landmark	
Robert Wood Johnson Museum of Frontier Medicine		San Angelo	Tom Green	North Ward of Post Hospital	
Miss Hattie's Bordello	Miss Hatties Bordello Museum Entrance	San Angelo	Tom Green	Tours of the Victorian period	
Railway Museum of San Angelo	San Angelo Railroad depot	San Angelo	Tom Green	Located in a 1909 Orient-Santa Fe Depot	
San Angelo Museum of Fine Arts	San Angelo Museum of Fine Arts	San Angelo	Tom Green	Texas artists, Mexican and Mexican-American art	
Adrian House		McCamey	Upton		
Denver City Heritage Museum		Denver City	Yoakum	Local history and memorabilia	
Medallion Home Museum		Kermit	Winkler	Carpenter Gothic house built in 1907 by W. H. Seastrunk	
Mendoza Trail Museum		McCamey	Upton	Recorded Texas Historic Landmark	
Ward County Museum Complex		Monahans	Ward	1920s jail, Holman House, and other collections	
Rankin Museum		Rankin	Upton	Recorded Texas Historic Landmark, 1920s period Yates Hotel, local history displays	
Rattlesnake Bomber Base Museum		Monahans	Ward County	Pyote Air Force Base	
Roy Orbison Museum		Wink	Winkler	Life and career of musician Roy Orbison	
Tsa Mo Ga Memorial Museum		Plains	Yoakum	Operated by the Texas Federation of Women's Club, open by appointment	
Winkler County Historical Museum		Wink	Winkler	Local history	

== Defunct museums ==
- El Paso Explorium, El Paso, closed in 2015
- El Paso Firefighters Museum

== See also ==
- List of museums in Texas
- List of museums in East Texas
- List of museums in the Texas Gulf Coast
- List of museums in North Texas
- List of museums in the Texas Panhandle
- List of museums in South Texas
- List of museums in Central Texas

== Resources ==
- Texas Association of Museums
- Historic House Museums in Texas
