= San Antonio Sporting District =

Former red-light district

Coordinates: 29.4247956°N 98.5014711°W

The Sporting District The District
- Red-light district in San Antonio, Texas, U.S.
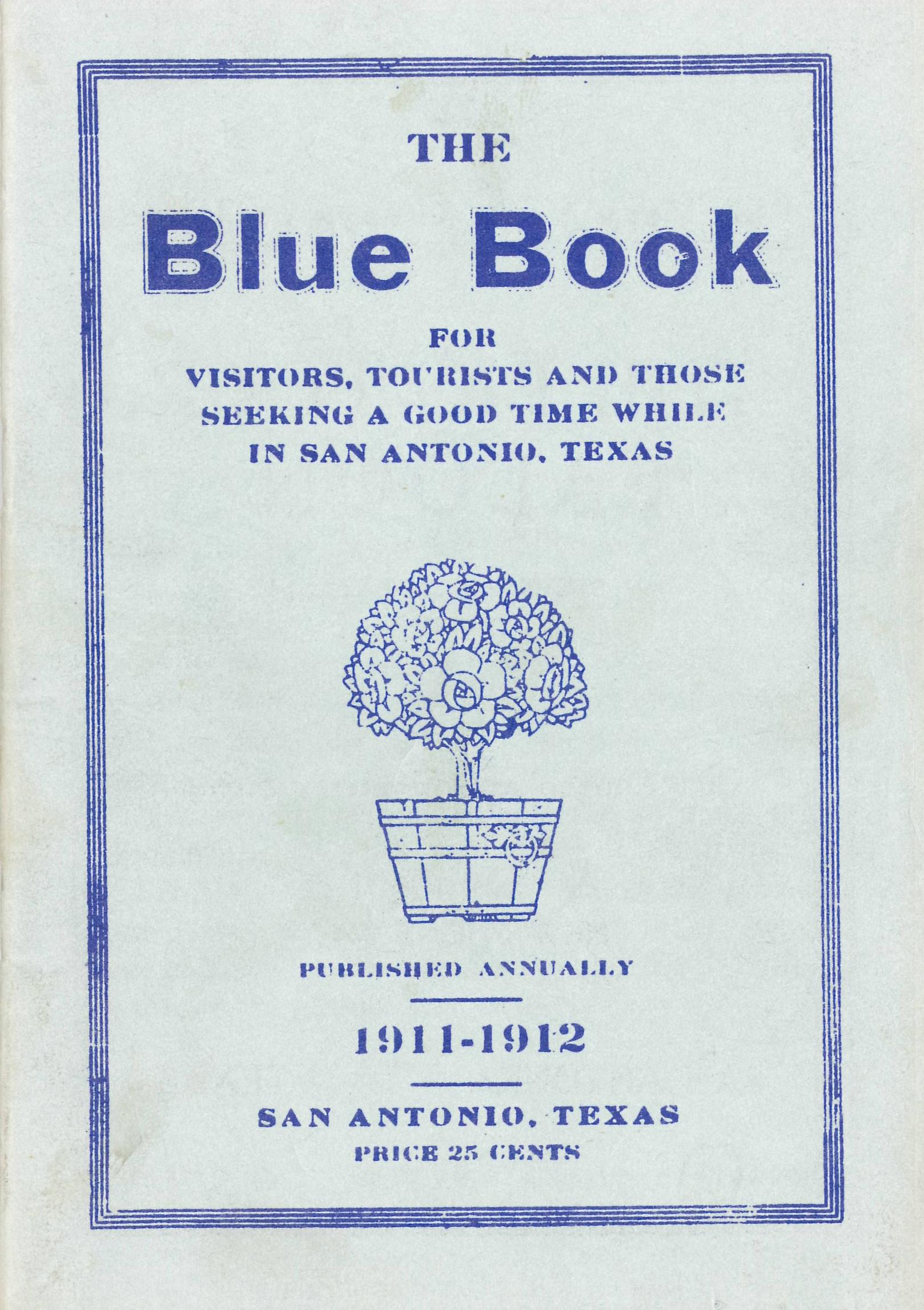
- The 1911–1912 Blue Book, a tourist guide to San Antonio's Sporting District
- Interactive map of The Sporting District
- Established: 1889
- Shut down: 1941

The Sporting District was a red-light district in the U.S. city of San Antonio, Texas in the late 19th and early 20th centuries. It was established by the city council to manage prostitution in the city. For a time it was one of the nation's largest vice districts with venues ranging from brothels to gambling halls. The area was officially shut down in 1941 resulting from the mobilization for World War II.

The term sporting was a common 19th-century euphemism for gambling and/or prostitution. Many communities around the U.S. used this term; brothels were often referred to as sporting houses.

== Boundaries ==
The District contained approximately 10 blocks of the city. Its boundary was described as follows in a tourist guide:

... south on South Santa Rosa Street for three blocks, beginning at Dolorosa Street, thence from the 100 block to the end of the 500 block on Matamoras Street, thence from the 200 block to the 500 block on South Concho Street, and lastly the 100 block on Monterey Street. This is the boundary within which the women are compelled to live according to law.

— The Blue Book for Visitors and Tourists and those Seeking a Good Time while in San Antonio, Texas

== History ==
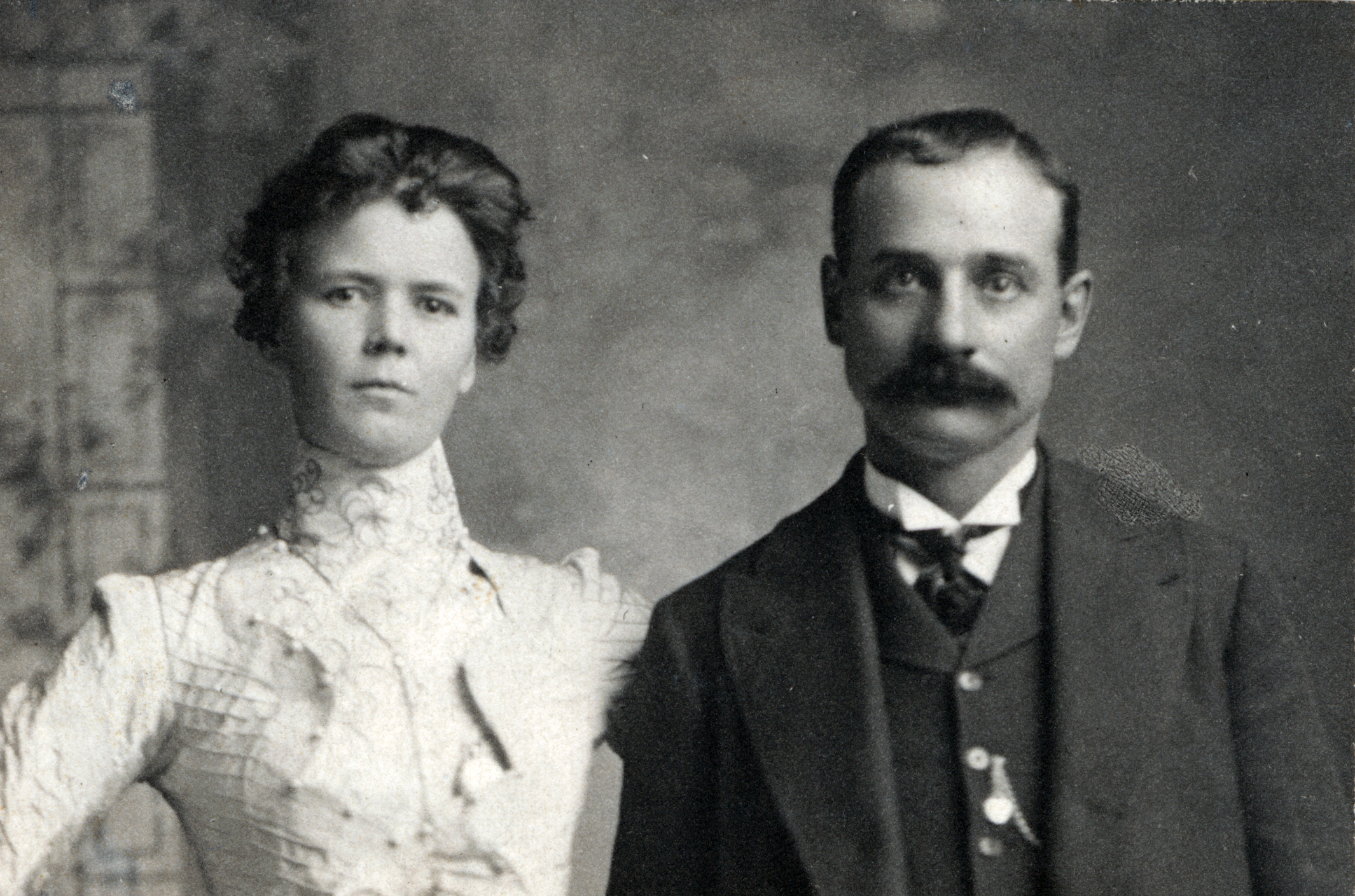
Della Moore, one of Fannie Porter's prostitutes, and outlaw Kid Curry

During the earlier years of the state, San Antonio was Texas' largest city. One of the city's most important business leaders was Jack Harris, who established the Vaudeville Theater and Saloon in 1872, in what would later become the Sporting District. The saloon, which was the city's first business to utilize the fledgeling Electric Company in 1882, quickly became the most popular entertainment venue in the city, offering liquor, live theater, and gambling. Soon other entertainment entrepreneurs, including prostitutes, appeared nearby. The Theater's location, the corner of Soledad and Commerce, became known as "Fatal Corner", owing to the violent crowd that the saloon attracted.

The Sporting District was formally established in 1889 by the San Antonio city council to contain and regulate prostitution. The area became home to brothels, dance halls, saloons, gambling parlors, and other illegal, or at least vice-oriented, businesses. City officials did not officially condone the activities but rather unofficially regulated them. The area also included many legitimate businesses including hotels and restaurants.

By the early 20th century, the District had become so large that, not only was it the largest red-light district in Texas, but it was one of the largest in the nation (third in the nation by some accounts). Brothels were required to pay $500 annually in licensing fees. In 1911 businesses in the area provided the city with approximately $50,000 ($1.73 million in today's dollars) annually in licensing fees. The most successful brothels boasted amenities such as ballrooms and orchestras. Because of the area's size a "Blue Book" was published as a tourist guide for visitors. The 1911–1912 edition listed 106 vice entertainment venues as well as many other businesses. In contrast to the relatively raucous red-light districts in other parts of the country, San Antonio's was known for being relatively subdued and civilized. Despite its fame and economic significance however, very little was recorded about the District because neither city officials nor journalists were typically willing to acknowledge knowing about the illegal activities.

An unusual facet of San Antonio's red-light district was the lack of racial segregation in the District. Despite the general segregation that permeated society in Texas, establishments in the Sporting District generally catered to black men just as much as white men.

Between the world wars, particularly during the Depression, the District deteriorated as higher-class prostitutes abandoned the area in favor of working as call girls in hotels. Violent crime and theft in the area grew. With the arrival of World War II, the District gained the disapproval of the local army leadership, particularly Dwight D. Eisenhower, who was the Third Army's chief of staff at Fort Sam Houston from August to December 1941.

The District was finally shut down in 1941 by San Antonio Police Commissioner P.L. Anderson, with the strong approval of Major General Richard Donovan. In July 1941, President Franklin D. Roosevelt had signed into law a federal ban on prostitution near naval and army bases. Despite the closure, San Antonio continued to be a major center of prostitution until well after the war.

== Major venues ==
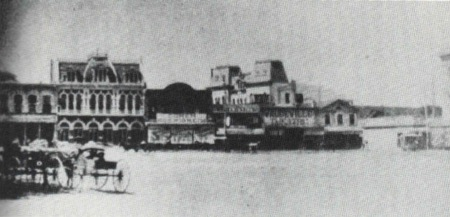
The Jack Harris Vaudeville Saloon and Theater, circa 1880

The Sporting District contained numerous entertainment venues. The Vaudeville Theater and Saloon was one of the first and most prominent. Another famous venue was Fannie Porter's Sporting House, which was actually located a block outside the borders of the district as defined by the city. Apart from being a well-established brothel, the home became a hideout for the gang of famed outlaw Butch Cassidy.

Other well-known venues included the Mansion, the Beauty Saloon, the White Elephant Saloon, and the Buckhorn Saloon.

== See also ==
- Barbary Coast, San Francisco
- Chicken Ranch (Texas)
- Fannie Porter
- Free State of Galveston
- Gambling in the United States
- History of vice in Texas
- Sporting District (Omaha, Nebraska)
- Storyville
- Vaudeville Theater ambush
