= Miss Hattie's Bordello =

Museum in San Angelo, Texas

Coordinates: 31.46044°N 100.4348°W

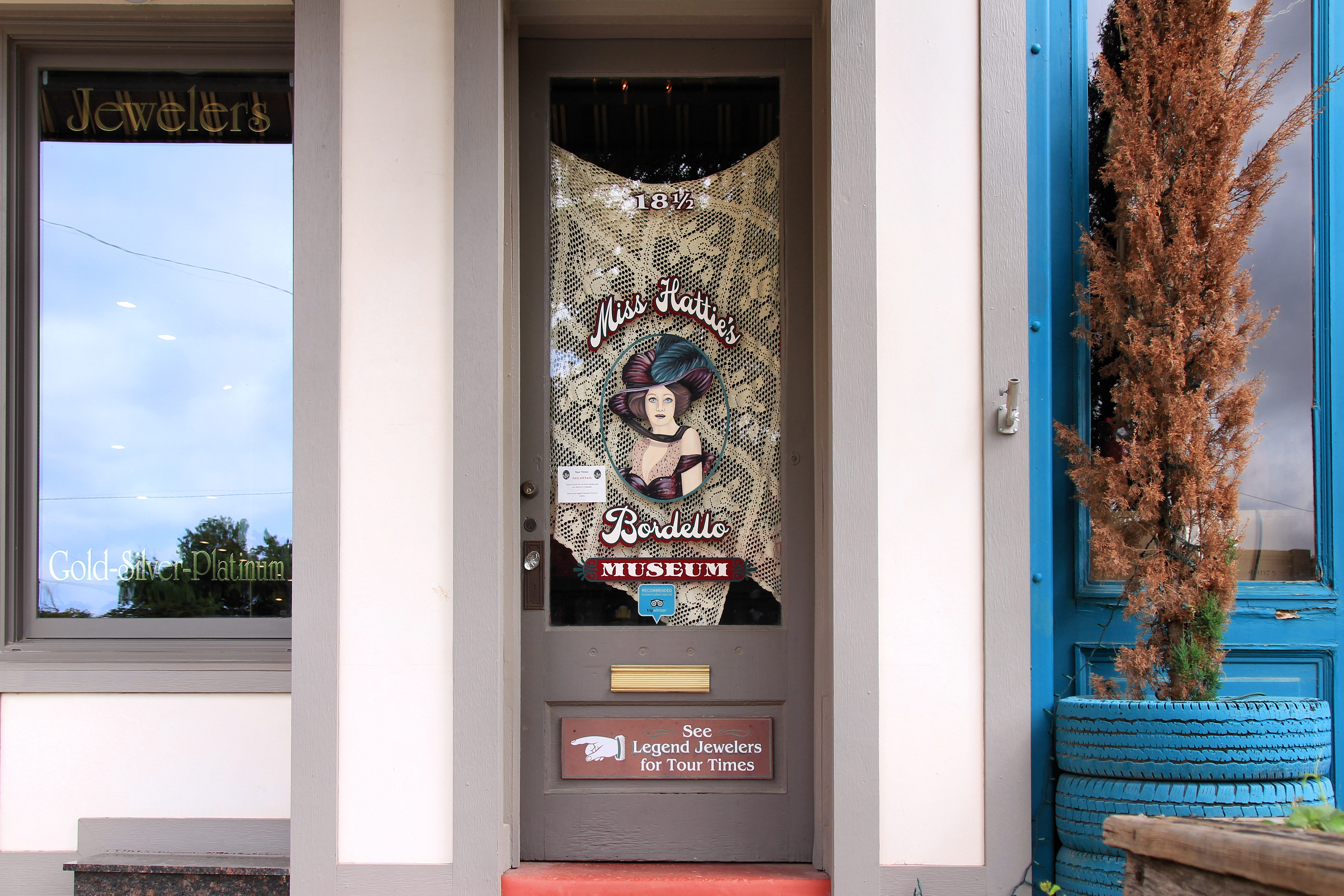
Miss Hattie's Bordello Museum Entrance

Miss Hattie's Bordello is a tourist trap and interpretive museum located in downtown San Angelo, Texas. It purports to be the building where "Miss Hattie" operated a brothel from 1902 to 1952.

== History ==
In 1870, Bartholomew J. DeWitt established San Angelo across the Concho River from Fort Concho. The town was soon one of general good stores, saloons, and brothels, and earned a poor reputation. The fort and its garrisons of African American soldiers were often at odds—sometimes violently—with the town's citizenry. DeWitt had borrowed money from a San Antonio-based investor, Marcus Koenigheim to found San Angelo. When DeWitt could not repay Koenigheim, the latter man sued the former and settled for the remaining property DeWitt had not managed to sell. The venture was not profitable to the point of Koenigheim being unable to rid himself of it by sale. He attempted to raise the property value in the town by giving land to churches.

From the 1890s to the early 20th century, San Angelo passed ordinances to limit prostitution in the city.

In 1977, Evelyn Hill and Juania Higuera purchased 18.5 E. Concho. Two years later, Hill remodeled the upper story of the building into the present museum. Museum established, Hill created the story of Miss Hattie's bordello, alleging that it operated from 1902 to 1952. According to Miss Hattie's Bordello Museum, the brothel was established by a Mrs. Hatton while her husband ran a saloon on the ground floor. A Hatton, E. A. Hatton, did build and operate a business at 18.5 E. Concho, but he and his wife left San Angelo within two years and did not operate a brothel in the building. By 1912, there were four separate businesses on the first floor while the second floor was vacant. A bordello is believed to have occupied the second floor of 18.5 E. Concho from 1936 to 1949.

== See also ==
- Chicken Ranch (Texas)
- History of vice in Texas
