= Vaudeville Theater ambush =

1884 criminal incident in San Antonio, Texas

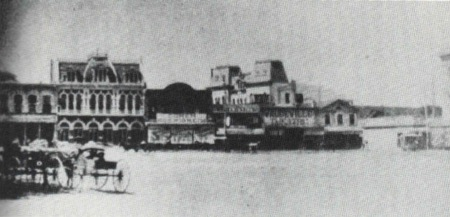
- Jack Harris Vaudeville Theater
- Date: March 11, 1884
- Location: San Antonio, Texas, United States
- Participants: Ben Thompson and King Fisher vs. Joe Foster and Jacob Coy
- Outcome: Ben Thompson and King Fisher killed outright; Joe Foster wounded and died; Jacob Coy crippled for life.
- Deaths: 3

The Vaudeville Theater ambush was the ambush and murder on March 11, 1884, by Joe Foster and Jacob Coy of former lawmen Ben Thompson and King Fisher. It took place at the Jack Harris Vaudeville Saloon and Theater in San Antonio, Texas. The ambush was in revenge for Ben Thompson's shooting of Jack Harris two years earlier.

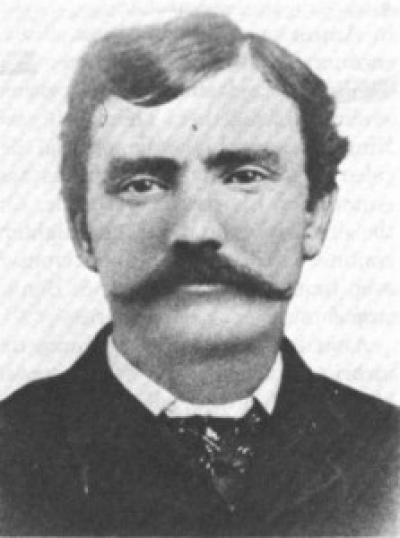
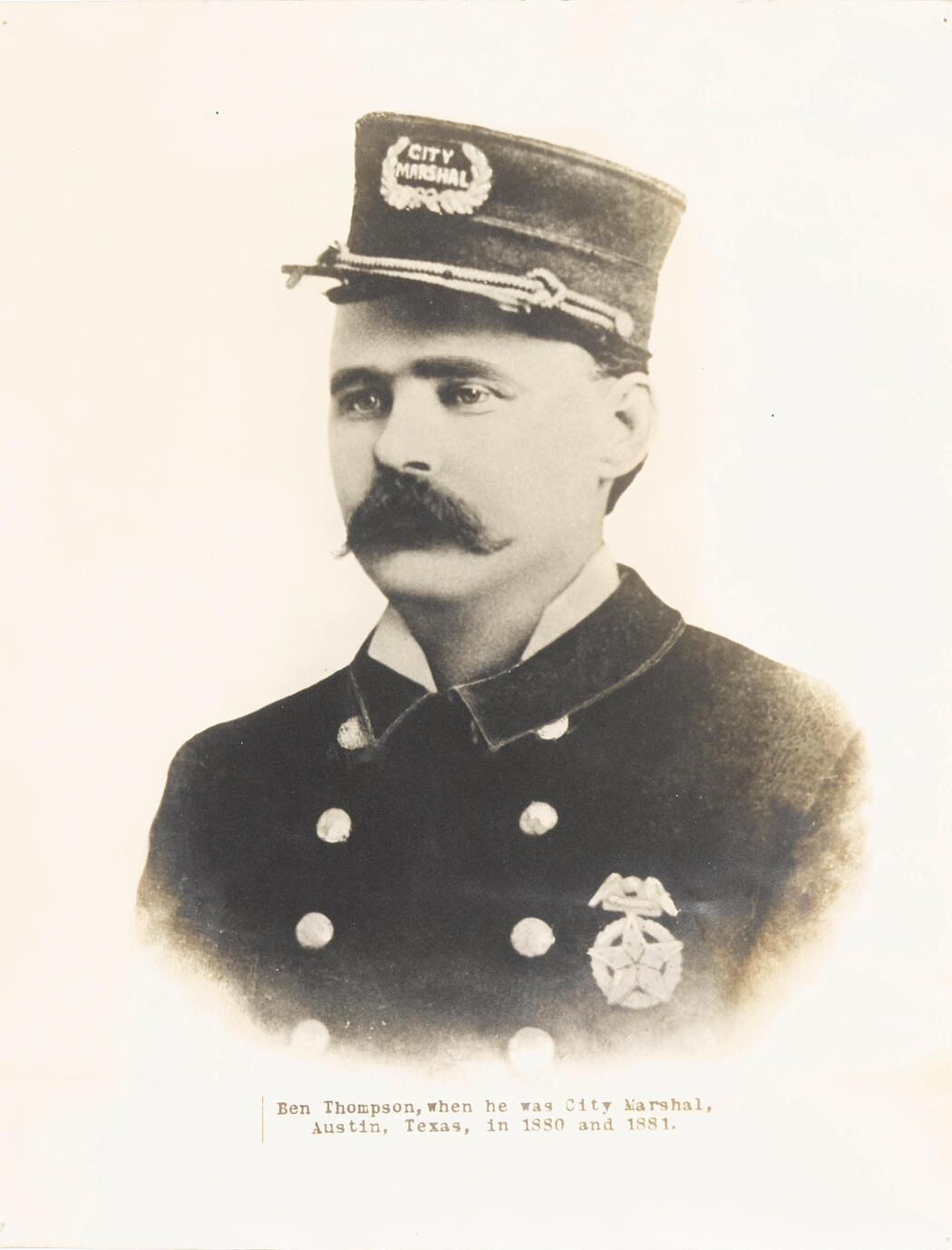
Fisher (left) and Thompson (right)

== Background ==
King Fisher and Ben Thompson were both noted gunmen of the Old West. Thompson had killed several men by 1884, including the 1882 death of popular theater owner Jack Harris in San Antonio. That shooting had been ruled self defense. Thompson had been appointed Chief of Police for the city of Austin, Texas, a job in which he had been extremely successful, and for which he was extremely popular in Austin. Thompson had only recently left that job, resigning after being cleared on the Harris shooting. King Fisher, a noted gunman in his own right with several killings to his credit also, was a good friend to Thompson, and by 1884 Fisher had settled into a more peaceful life with his family near Leakey, Texas, where he had become a successful rancher. Fisher had recently left the office of sheriff for Uvalde County, Texas, and on March 11, 1884, was in San Antonio on business.

Theater owner Jack Harris had been the leader of San Antonio's "sporting crowd". Originally from Ireland, Harris emigrated to Connecticut, then moved from there to Texas. He had previously worked for the San Antonio Police Department, and had served during the Civil War in the Confederate Army. After the Civil War, Harris may have served Emperor Maximilian during the Franco-Mexican War, but although it has been claimed, that was never confirmed. In 1868 Harris rejoined the police force, and bought a small saloon with a partner, selling his portion in 1872. With his profits he opened his own saloon, first calling it the Jack Harris Bar and Billiard Room, but then changing the name to the Vaudeville Variety Theater. It quickly became the most popular place in San Antonio and helped anchor what would become known as the Sporting District, the city's red-light district.

Harris knew gunman Ben Thompson from their service in the army. In 1880, Thompson spent some time at the Vaudeville, gambling heavily alongside Harris' partner, Joe Foster, and with Thompson losing. Thompson left in what was referred to as a "bad mood", and although it was reported he made threats, that has never been substantiated. Thompson returned to Austin, where in addition to being Chief of Police, he owned the Iron Front Saloon. Harris and Foster sent word to Thompson that he was no longer welcome in their establishment. Had Harris simply told Thompson that, rather than vocally expressing that Thompson was not welcome in his business in public, the matter would have likely stopped there. However, upon receiving word that Harris was telling many people that he told Thompson he wasn't welcome and he wasn't to return, Thompson simply returned on July 11, 1882. Vaudeville Variety Theater manager Billy Simms met Thompson on the street, and tried to persuade him to avoid the Vaudeville, but was unsuccessful. Thompson entered, and approached the bartender, and told him to pass word to both Foster and Harris that he intended to "close this damn whorehouse". Although it can be taken different ways, he likely meant that he intended to stay all night there, rather than meaning it literally.

Thompson had a drink with jeweler Leon Rouvant, then departed. Meanwhile, Billy Simms went upstairs and put on his guns and warned Harris, who then went and obtained a shotgun, after which he placed himself behind a screen in view of the front door, where he waited for Thompson for at least ten minutes. This would be the second mistake Harris would make in the matter. Thompson had gone outside, visiting with people on the street that he knew. Thompson returned, not actually entering but rather standing just outside the doorway, and saw Harris with the shotgun, but at first said nothing. After a few minutes, with Harris still watching Thompson, the latter finally said, "What are you going to do with that shotgun, you damned son of a bitch?" To which Harris replied, "You kiss my ass, you son of a bitch!" Within seconds, two shots rang out. At least one witness would later state that after the verbal exchange, it was one or two minutes later that the shots were fired, but in fact it was only a matter of a couple of seconds at the most. According to some witnesses, Thompson had seen Harris, but did not initially enter the saloon. Instead, he waited, watched, allowed two ladies to enter by holding the doors for them, then passed the before mentioned verbal exchange, after which the two shots were fired almost immediately.

Harris staggered, having not discharged his shotgun, made it upstairs, then collapsed. A doctor was summoned, to which Harris is alleged to have said, "He took advantage of me and shot me from the dark." However, this in fact was not exactly true. Although Harris never fired, he was armed openly, and the area was lighted, Thompson was in fact standing just outside the doorway, which was darkened, but Harris' stance of producing and brandishing the shotgun placed Harris at a distinct disadvantage, as it was an easy case for self-defense on the part of Thompson. Further, although Thompson was standing in a more darkened area than Harris, there was nothing to suggest it was a planned point from which to fire, it simply was, in fact, where he happened to be standing. Thompson returned to his hotel room at the Menger Hotel, where he remained the rest of the night without being approached by police. The following morning he surrendered himself to Bexar County, Texas Sheriff Thomas P. McCall and San Antonio Police Chief Shariden.

A written battle of words began between two newspapers, the San Antonio Light and the Austin Statesman, one screaming for justice against Thompson, the other defending him. Newspapers from across the state editorialized and followed suit, some pro-Thompson, others con. Many citizens in San Antonio felt the town was better off without Harris, while others denounced Thompson as a murderer. An indictment was handed down on September 6, 1882, and although a change of venue was considered, by that time sentiment was leaning in Thompson's favor, so the case was tried in San Antonio. In the subsequent trial that followed, Thompson was acquitted on January 30, 1883. This caused ill will from many of the citizens of San Antonio, especially those who were close friends to Harris. Friends to Thompson cheered outside the courtroom when the verdict was announced, and upon his return to Austin he was met by a large crowd of supporters.

== Ambush ==
On March 11, 1884, while in San Antonio on business, Fisher came into contact with his old friend Ben Thompson, also visiting town on business. Thompson was still very unpopular in San Antonio after the death of Harris. A feud over that killing had been brewing since between Thompson and friends of Harris, to include Joe Foster. King Fisher would, ironically, become a victim in a situation in which he played no part whatsoever, short of being present on that day.

Fisher and Thompson attended a play on March 11 at the Turner Hall Opera House, and later, at around 10:30pm, they went to the Vaudeville Variety Theater. A local lawman named Jacob Coy sat with them. Thompson wanted to see Joe Foster, the theater owner and friend of Harris's who was now partnered with Billy Simms, and who was one of the main people fueling the ongoing feud. Thompson had already spoken to Billy Simms, with whom he'd had a cordial and almost friendly conversation.

Despite the feud and the general dislike for Thompson felt by many in San Antonio, both he and Fisher were feared men. Their reputations as gunmen, and their having proven their skills in that trade in many documented events made anyone wishing to face them have second thoughts. It is likely that this was what led to Thompson's enemies deciding on an ambush rather than an armed face-to-face confrontation.

Fisher and Thompson were directed upstairs to meet with Foster. Coy and Simms soon joined them in the theater box. Foster refused to speak with Thompson. Fisher allegedly noticed that something was not right. Simms and Coy stepped aside, and as they did Fisher and Thompson leapt to their feet just as a volley of gunfire erupted from another theater box, with a hail of bullets hitting both Thompson and Fisher. Thompson fell onto his side, and either Coy or Foster ran up to him and shot him in the head with a pistol. Thompson returned fire with two shots, dying almost immediately afterward. Fisher was shot thirteen times, and did fire one round in retaliation, possibly wounding Coy, but that is not confirmed, as Coy may have been shot by one of the attackers. Coy was left crippled for life, and never recovered completely.

Foster, in attempting to draw his own pistol at the first of the fight, shot himself in the leg. Foster was carried down the street for medical attention, and his leg was amputated, but he died of blood loss during the operation. The exact description of the events of that night are contradictory, as it was totally dependent on anti-Thompson witnesses, or the attackers themselves. At first, the attackers attempted to claim that Thompson and Foster had argued, and that Thompson had drawn his gun on Foster prompting Foster to draw, which resulted in an open gun battle. That, however, was disproved over time. What is certain is that the two gunmen were ambushed with no prior knowledge of the attack, which put aside any self-defense claims by the attackers.

There was a public outcry for a grand jury indictment of those involved, not only from Austin and other parts of Texas, but from many inside San Antonio, who felt the ambush was cowardly. However, no action was ever taken. The San Antonio Police and the prosecutor showed little interest in the case, and eventually it simply went away. Fisher was buried on his ranch. His body was later moved to the Pioneer Cemetery in Uvalde, Texas. Thompson's body was returned to Austin, and his funeral was one of the largest in Austin's history at that time. Thompson was buried at the Oakwood Cemetery in Austin.

== See also ==
- History of vice in Texas
- San Antonio Sporting District
