= Lottie Deno =

American gambler (1844–1934)

- Born: Carlotta J. Thompkins; April 21, 1844; Warsaw, Kentucky, U.S.A.
- Died: February 9, 1934 (aged 89); Deming, New Mexico, U.S.A.
- Other names: Charlotte Tompkins, Charlotte Thurmond, Mystic Maud, Angel of San Antonio
- Occupation(s): Gambler, later Sunday-school teacher
- Years active: ca. 1860–ca. 1880
- Spouse: Frank Thurmond

Carlotta J. Thompkins, also known as Lottie Deno (April 21, 1844 – February 9, 1934), was a famous gambler in Texas and New Mexico during the nineteenth century known for her poker skills as well as her courage.

She was born in Kentucky and traveled a great deal in her early adulthood before coming to Texas. Much of her earlier life and even her real name at birth are a matter of debate among historians, but her fame as a poker player in the Southwest is not. According to author Johnny Hughes, "In the late 1800s Texas' most famous poker player was Lottie Deno (a shortened form of 'dinero' - Spanish for money)."

== Early life ==
Carlotta J. Thompkins (her presumed real name) was born on April 21, 1844, in Warsaw, Kentucky. Her family was reportedly quite wealthy and her father, a racehorse breeder and prominent gambler, is said to have traveled extensively with Lottie, teaching her the secrets of winning at cards at some of the finest casinos. After her father's death in the Civil War, Lottie's mother sent her to Detroit to find a husband. She was accompanied by Mary Poindexter, her loyal slave and nanny. After running out of money in Detroit, Thompkins fell into a life of gambling, traveling the Mississippi River. Poindexter, reportedly seven feet tall and formidable, acted as Thompkins' protector during their travels.

== Gambling days in Texas ==
Lottie arrived in San Antonio in 1865. She became a house gambler at the University Club working for the Thurmond family from Georgia. It was during this time that she met and fell in love with Frank Thurmond, a fellow gambler.

After being accused of murder, Frank fled San Antonio and Lottie followed. The pair traveled for many years throughout the frontier areas of Texas, including Fort Concho, Jacksboro, San Angelo, Denison, Fort Worth, and Fort Griffin. Their travels occurred during a local economic boom on the Texas frontier, as demand for bison hides spiked in the mid and late 1870s. Cowboys and traders flush with cash during the period became targets for gamblers in frontier communities. It was at Fort Griffin, where Lottie lingered for some time, that her notoriety and legend became most established. Fort Griffin, a frontier outpost west of Fort Worth near the Texas Panhandle, was known for its saloons and the rough element it attracted. Gaining fame as a gambler, Lottie became associated with various Old West personalities, including Doc Holliday.

During her travels, she gained numerous nicknames. In San Antonio she was known as the "Angel of San Antonio." At Fort Concho she became known as "Mystic Maud." At Fort Griffin she was called "Queen of the Pasteboards" and "Lottie Deno." It was this last moniker by which she became best known. Her escapades during this period became part of the folklore of the American Wild West.

== Later life ==
Lottie and Frank moved to Kingston, New Mexico, in 1877, where they ran a gambling room in the Victorio Hotel. Lottie later became the owner of the Broadway Restaurant in Silver City.

In 1880, Lottie and Frank were married in Silver City. In 1882 they moved to Deming, New Mexico, where they settled permanently and gave up their gambling life. They became upstanding citizens in the community, with Frank eventually becoming vice president of Deming National Bank and Lottie helping to found St. Luke's Episcopal Church.

Lottie died on February 9, 1934, and was buried in Deming as Charlotte Thurmond.

== Legacy ==
Miss Kitty Russell, a character from the long-running American radio and television show Gunsmoke, starring James Arness, is based on Lottie Deno.

Lisa Gaye played Deno in the episode "Lottie's Legacy" of the syndicated anthology series Death Valley Days, hosted by Robert Taylor. In the dramatization, Lottie falls in love with the Reverend Peter Green (John Clarke), who does not know the details of her past.

== See also ==
- History of vice in Texas
