= History of vice in Texas =

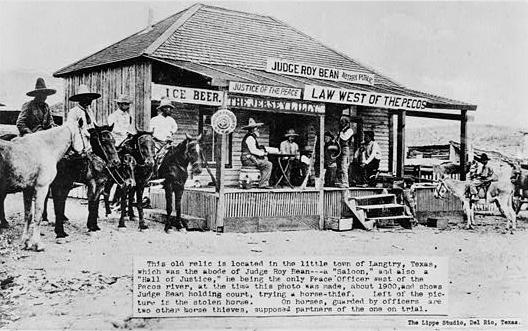
A saloon and courthouse operated by the legendary Judge Roy Bean in west Texas during the late 19th century

The history of vice in the U.S. state of Texas has been an important part of the state's past and has greatly influenced its development. Vice activities, such as gambling and prostitution, have historically been a significant facet of both the state's culture and its economy.

Law enforcement organizations have traditionally defined vice as including prostitution, gambling, alcohol and narcotics, and pornography. These activities, though always controversial, represented major influences in the state with some enterprises at times holding legendary status. The legal status of the individual activities has fluctuated substantially over time. Additionally during some periods individual communities and public officials have been accepting of many of these activities, even when they were illegal, because of corruption, because the activities were seen as inevitable, or often because the activities were economically important.

Though these vices have existed throughout the state's history, their prevalence has varied greatly over time. Over the course of the 19th century alcohol and narcotics became heavily abused to the point that by the turn of the century alcohol abuse was listed as a significant cause of premature deaths. Gambling and prostitution came to thrive in the frontier towns, first as small enterprises but gradually becoming more organized with gambling halls and bordellos appearing in major cities. Red-light districts appeared throughout the state with San Antonio's Sporting District becoming one of the largest in the nation. The vice activities in these districts were often illegal, but city and state officials were willing to allow them provided they remained contained in their designated areas. These districts at times became havens for criminal outlaws from various parts of the lower Midwest and the Southwest.

By the beginning of the twentieth century, the Progressive Movement was rising and efforts to repress vice were growing throughout the state. First gambling and then alcohol and narcotics became increasingly repressed by state and national authorities, especially during the Prohibition era of the 1920s. Nevertheless, these activities continued and for a time even grew, enabled by the public's disdain for the new ordinances. The El Paso/Juarez region became a major tourist center because these businesses were either legal or more tolerated in Mexico than in Texas.

As in the rest of the nation, organized crime grew rapidly in Texas during the Prohibition period. But by the end of World War II most of the vice districts were officially shut down. A notable exception was the island of Galveston, the whole of which remained an open center of gambling, liquor, and prostitution until the 1950s. During the 1940s and 1950s, however, many of the major gaming figures in Texas opted to move their gambling operations to Las Vegas where gambling had recently become legal. Their investments led to many of the most important venues in Las Vegas including the Hotel Last Frontier and the Sands.

== Early Texas and the Republic of Texas ==
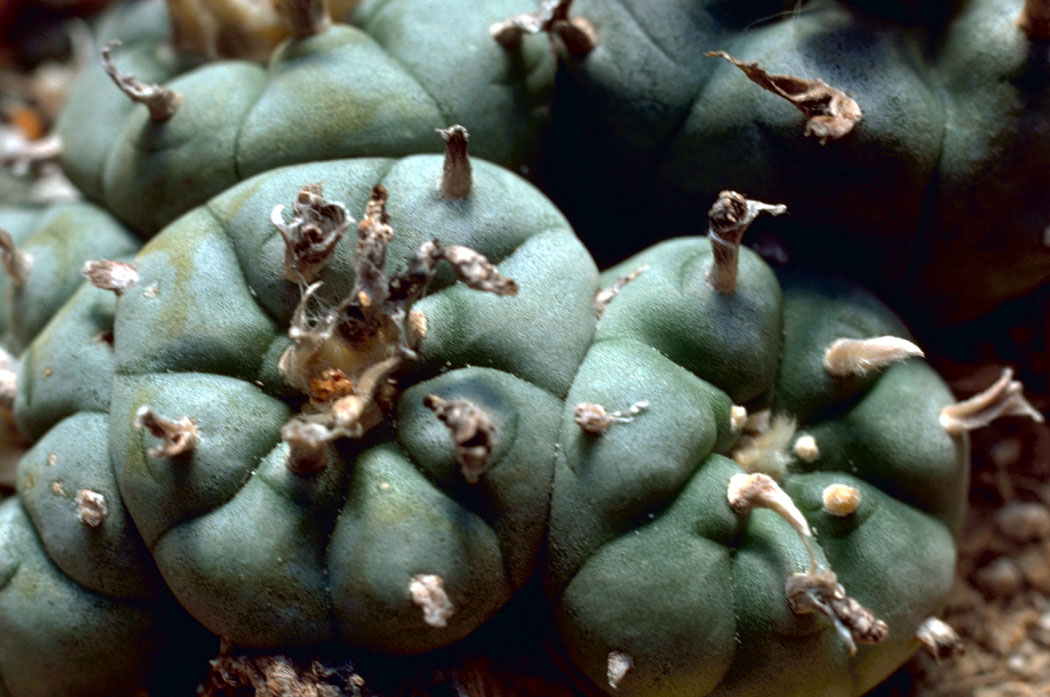
The peyote plant, used by Native American tribes in Texas for its hallucinogenic properties

Before the arrival of the European settlers in Texas, the plant peyote (peyotl in Nahuatl) had become a popular hallucinogenic among tribes in the Rio Grande Valley as well as parts of West Texas and Chihuahua. Tribes in the area included the Carrizo Coahuiltecan and later the Lipan and Mescalero Apache, and even the Karankawa and the Caddo tribes. The plant came to be used for both recreational and ritual usage. Its hallucinogenic effects were regarded with suspicion among the Spaniards and the drug was never widely used outside the Native American communities.

Gambling was a popular pastime in many parts of early Mexico including its northern territory of Texas. In some communities it was such an accepted norm that even children were known to participate with the adults.

As early as 1817 records show the presence of prostitution in the Spanish region which would become Texas. Prostitution at this time clearly met with official disapproval though it still took place.

As settlers from the United States moved into the Mexican Texas, new settlements typically had saloons and gambling halls before churches were ever established. The pre-Civil War era was a period of especially liberal alcohol consumption in Texas. The city of Houston was well known at this time as a center of vice with businesses that sold liquor representing one of the largest business sectors. Nearby Fort Bend County for a time registered more liquor licenses than all other businesses combined.

Opium had become a popular drug worldwide and was regarded by many as having medicinal qualities. Many people at all levels of Texas society are reported to have been addicts including Texas General Sam Houston and Mexican President Antonio Lopez de Santa Anna, the leaders of the opposing forces in the Texas Revolution.

== State of Texas in the 19th century ==
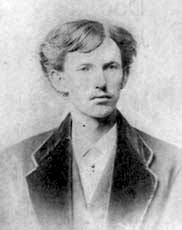
"Doc" Holliday, a famous gunfighter and gambler during the post-Civil War period

Even after Texas was admitted to the Union in the mid-19th century it remained in various ways a frontier territory throughout the 19th century and even the early 20th century. Though population centers became established early they were small. There was a steady stream of newcomers into the state with men generally outnumbering women, thus creating a demand for prostitutes. Many immigrants to the state were criminals and others fleeing the law from other parts of the U.S. Texas in fact was known as a haven for criminals because of its lax laws and even more lax enforcement. The phrase "Gone to Texas" took on a notorious connotation in that it was commonly associated with fugitives. This was so common, in fact, that in many communities it was considered impolite to ask for too many details of someone's past. The state held fast to an ideal of freedom which created a climate for the development of vice. In fairness, the U.S. as a whole during the 19th century was much more tolerant of vices like gambling, alcohol, and drugs than it is today, but the environment in many parts of Texas was even more tolerant. One notable exception of this was the forbidding of a state lottery in the state constitution.

Following the American Civil War, during the Reconstruction era, lawlessness took hold in many frontier outposts, especially along the Mexican border. Smuggling operations as well as saloons and gambling houses became increasingly common. New settlements began to dot the western frontier of the state with gambling a popular form of recreation at the saloons for the numerous cowboys and buffalo hunters who passed through. Professional gamblers, such as "Doc" Holliday and "Lottie Deno" (Charlotte Thompkins), traveled circuits through these settlements preying on the unsuspecting. Unregulated gambling on the frontier reached its peak in the 1870s before communities began to establish more formal ordinances and more strictly enforce them. The 1870s in particular were an economic boom period on the Texas frontier because of a spike in demand for bison hides. Towns and outposts from El Paso and San Antonio to Fort Griffin, Fort Worth, and Denison saw periodic arrivals of cowboys and traders flush with cash and frequently looking for entertainment including any form of vice a community might offer. For its part El Paso, which by this time was a relatively large community, was still predominantly a way station for commerce between the interior of Mexico and New Mexico. Its largest business sectors revolved around gaming, drinking, and prostitution; indeed town meetings were held at the saloon of the town's mayor Ben Dowell. Further east, the small frontier outpost of Fort Griffin became one of the most notorious centers of vice and lawlessness.

Re-enactment of the 1887 White Elephant Saloon shootout between Luke Short and Jim Courtright

Galveston and Houston earned early reputations for making drinking, and other vices, glamorous. Very early on, imported alcoholic beverages of every variety could be found in shops and hotels within these cities. In the 1840s German scientist and author Ferdinand von Roemer remarked on one of Houston's taverns:

Upon passing through large folding doors, one stepped into a spacious room in which stood long rows of crystal bottles on a beautifully decorated bar. These were filled with divers kinds of firewater. Here also stood an experienced barkeeper in white-shirt sleeves, alert to serve to the patrons the various plain as well as mixed drinks.

— Ferdinand von Roemer

Marijuana was commonly sold in drugstores and other shops in these cities though this was largely seen as a recreational drug for the lower classes. The drug was also common in El Paso and other border communities.

By the end of the 19th century many of the state's cities had their own thriving vice districts (as did many cities across the U.S.). Galveston had the Postoffice Street district. San Antonio had the "Sporting District." Fort Worth had "Hell's Half Acre". San Antonio's was by far the largest. Though prostitution was, strictly speaking, illegal in most of the cities, it was not only tolerated but accepted. Bordellos were commonly licensed, and the businesses and prostitutes were "taxed" by way of regular fines that were imposed upon them. The red-light districts became accepted tourist attractions. In San Antonio, following the practice in other parts of the U.S., an annual guide was published for the city's Sporting District ranking the brothels according to quality and cost. Arguably the most famous brothel in Texas was Fannie Porter's in San Antonio.

Though for women prostitution was often the highest paying opportunity, few prostitutes were ever able to raise themselves out of poverty, and they were always faced with the threat of violence and disease. As there were few relief agencies or respectable jobs for widows or abandoned women, there was always a steady supply of women in the trade.

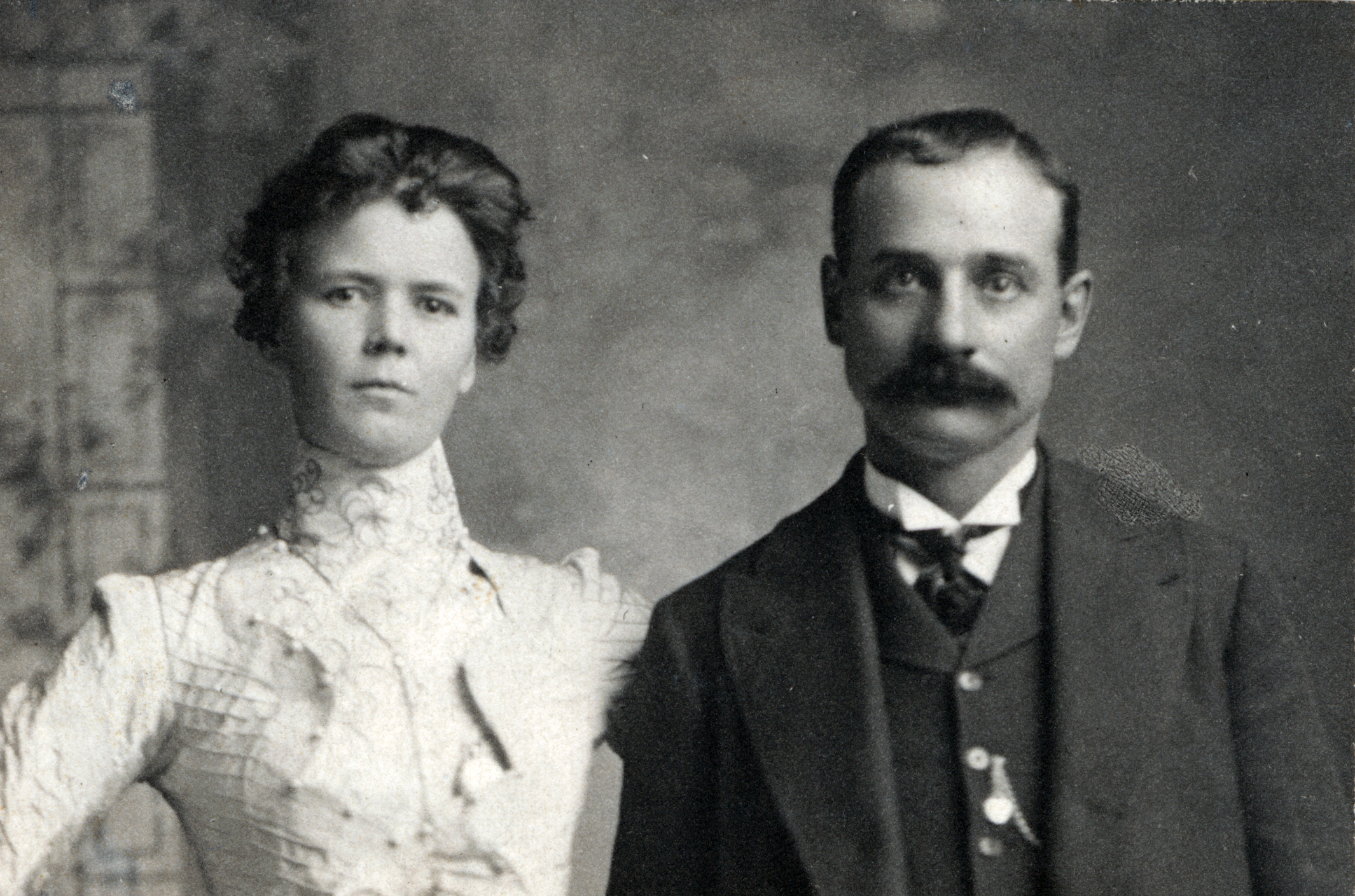
Della Moore, a prostitute at Fannie Porter's bordello

Even apart from traditional vice, corrupt practices were common in Texas during this period, often enabling vice activities to thrive, especially in the frontier areas. Among the more famous examples was Judge Roy Bean, an entrepreneur who established a saloon on the west Texas frontier. Bean soon established himself as the "judge" for the region around Pecos County though the legitimacy of his tenure varied greatly over time. Among his court cases was a ruling regarding a murder charge in which Bean concluded that "homicide was the killing of a human being; however, he could find no law against killing a Chinaman".

Public drunkenness was increasingly reported on as serious issue. Texans overall were notorious as heavy drinkers. Reports at the end of the 19th century indicate a public perception that drinking was a major cause of early deaths in the state. The temperance movement began to gain a foothold as a result. Local laws were established to restrict or outlaw alcoholic beverages inadvertently creating thriving markets for illegal liquor. During this earlier period illegal liquor primarily took the form of moonshine, starting a tradition that would carry on for generations.

== Progressive era and Prohibition ==
Former vice districts
City	District
Austin	"Guy Town"
Amarillo	"The Bowery"
Beaumont	"The Reservation"
Corpus Christi	"The Flats"
Dallas	"Frogtown"
El Paso	"Utah Street"
Fort Worth	"Hell's Half Acre"
Galveston	"Postoffice Street"
Houston	"Happy Hollow"
San Angelo	"Concho"
San Antonio	"Sporting District"
Waco	"Two Street"

Over the course of the 19th century, a Progressive Movement gained strength in Protestant areas of Europe and in much of North America. This movement favored the elimination of vice and perceived immorality in society, often through legislative means. Texas enacted "local option" laws that allowed counties and towns to ban alcohol within their borders. Some communities began to individually outlaw alcohol consumption.

In tandem with the Progressive Movement was a movement toward opposing big business and its perceived corrupting influence. With the passing of the federal Sherman Antitrust Act in 1890 and subsequent local pressure, the powerful, privately owned Louisiana Lottery, which had heavily influenced gaming in the Gulf states including Texas, was brought down in 1895. For its part Texas enacted its own antitrust legislation in 1889 that was actually stronger than the Sherman Act; indeed it was one of the most stringent in the nation.

The Progressive Era in the U.S. reached its height in the early 20th century. Attitudes in much of Texas turned decidedly against narcotics, alcohol, gambling, and other vices. In 1903 Texas outlawed virtually all forms of gambling, including parimutuel wagering. A notable consequence of this was the closing of the Texas State Fair and Rodeo, which had been centered around horse racing, for nearly two decades. Nevertheless, gambling continued illegally in many areas around the state.

North Texas and the Panhandle became the center of alcohol prohibitionist sentiment with most of North Texas outside of Dallas and Fort Worth becoming dry by 1903. Central and East Texas also held strong anti-alcohol contingents while the German and Mexican population in South Texas was largely anti-prohibition. Still by 1920 most legal saloons in the state had been shut down and alcohol prohibition had come to dominate in Texas politics. In 1909 federal law severely restricted use of opium. In 1919 Texas became the second state in the U.S. (after California) to outlaw marijuana.

Handling of prostitution was still mixed. City leaders continued to believe that it was impossible to eradicate prostitution altogether and the notion of creating red-light districts to contain it persisted. In 1906 Dallas city commissioners created the "Frogtown" district northwest of downtown officially making prostitution legal, in contradiction to state law. The Texas Supreme Court, however, struck down the ordinance in 1911.

The federal Mann Act of 1910 and other legislation was enacted to bring an end to prostitution. The red-light districts in Dallas, Austin, and Amarillo were closed in 1914. The districts in Houston and El Paso were closed in 1917 under pressure from the U.S. Secretary of War Newton D. Baker because of World War I. The districts in most other communities were closed as well. The closure of the openly operating brothels and saloons also led to the closure of most openly operating (but illegal) gambling venues since gambling and prostitution were often tied indirectly, if not directly. In spite of these closures, casinos and brothels continued to exist and often thrive as (barely) hidden enterprises.

Two notable exceptions to this trend of closures were San Antonio and Galveston whose vice districts, though put under pressure during World War I, were never closed (during this period). Though most cities had always made at least a pretense of trying to suppress vice within their jurisdiction, in these two towns prostitution, gambling, and drinking continued openly, even during the Progressive Era, and generally with the acceptance of city leaders. Commenting on the Church's attitudes toward vice, the Roman Catholic bishop of Galveston was once quoted as saying

We segregate mental and physical diseases. Let us do the same for moral sickness, for soul sickness. ... As long as man has free will some of us will fall into impurity.

— Christopher E. Byrne, Bishop of Galveston (1918–1950)

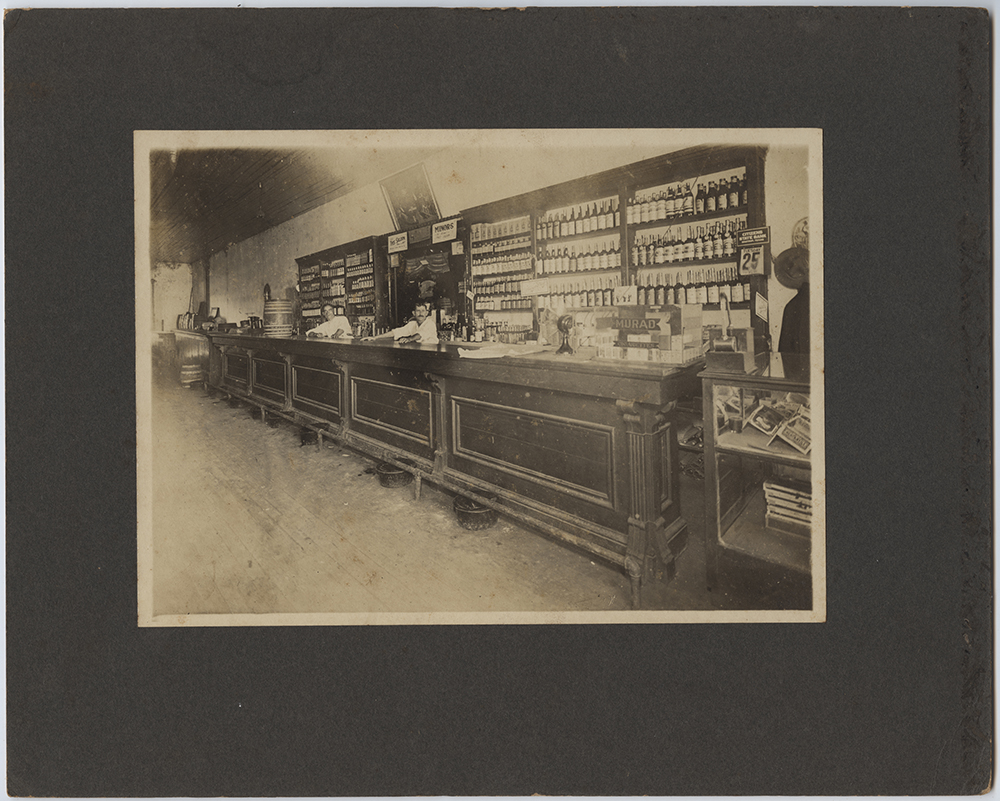
Saloon in Bastrop, Texas, ca. 1910

The crowning achievement of the Progressive era was the passing of the Eighteenth Amendment to the United States Constitution and the Volstead Act, which together outlawed the sale of liquor. Even before this most communities in Texas and across the U.S. had reached a point where most vice activities, including gambling and liquor, were firmly outlawed. Prohibition of liquor, though publicly embraced by community leaders, was privately widely unpopular in the state. Moonshining, the illegal production of liquor, had become increasingly common in the late 19th century. Moonshiners, notorious gamblers, and other outlaws had come to be seen by many as folk heroes. The passage of Prohibition nationwide had the immediate effect of creating a lucrative opportunity for organized crime and other individuals to supply the now illegal beverages. Among the greatest beneficiaries were the organized crime syndicates in Galveston, which became the primary importers and suppliers for Houston, Dallas, Denver, St. Louis and Omaha, as well as numerous other communities in Texas and the Midwest. This development became the genesis of a thriving tourist industry on the island run by organized crime figures Sam and Rosario Maceo. The entire island of Galveston became essentially one large vice district (though prostitution was still confined to Postoffice Street).

San Antonio's Sporting District continued to operate and thrive during this era, though public officials increasingly found themselves under scrutiny. The El Paso region also became an important beneficiary of the Progressive era albeit somewhat indirectly. The twin cities of El Paso (USA) and Juarez (Mexico) were originally a single town and, even after being split by national boundaries, continued to function as essentially a single community. Rather than attempt to fight the efforts to suppress vice in the U.S. many operators of vice simply established their businesses in Juarez where laws were more lenient and law enforcement was quite lax. This situation, particularly with the army post of Fort Bliss in the area, created a lucrative tourist trade that benefited both sides of the border.

In Houston and Dallas, even though there were no established districts for it in the later years of the Progressive era, gambling venues continued to operate openly.

A 1936 US Government report recorded that Joseph Civello of the Dallas mafia and Frank Ianni "have for many years been known as important illegal narcotic dealers in the Southwest but had always managed to escape punishment". In 1937, the Texas Department of Public Safety added a narcotics section because of increasing public concerns over drug abuse. In the same year Civello was sentenced to two concurrent 15-year prison terms on narcotics charges. He and his brothers Sam and Leon were caught with heroin valued at $300,000 at wholesale price. Civello served six years in Fort Leavenworth before being released in 1944. He received an early parole on the recommendation of Dallas Sheriff Bill Decker. Upon his released he continue trafficking in narcotics, Frank Coppola transported narcotics to Civello in Dallas. This was done by a trucking company owned by John Ormento of the Lucchese crime family.

== World War II and the post-war boom ==
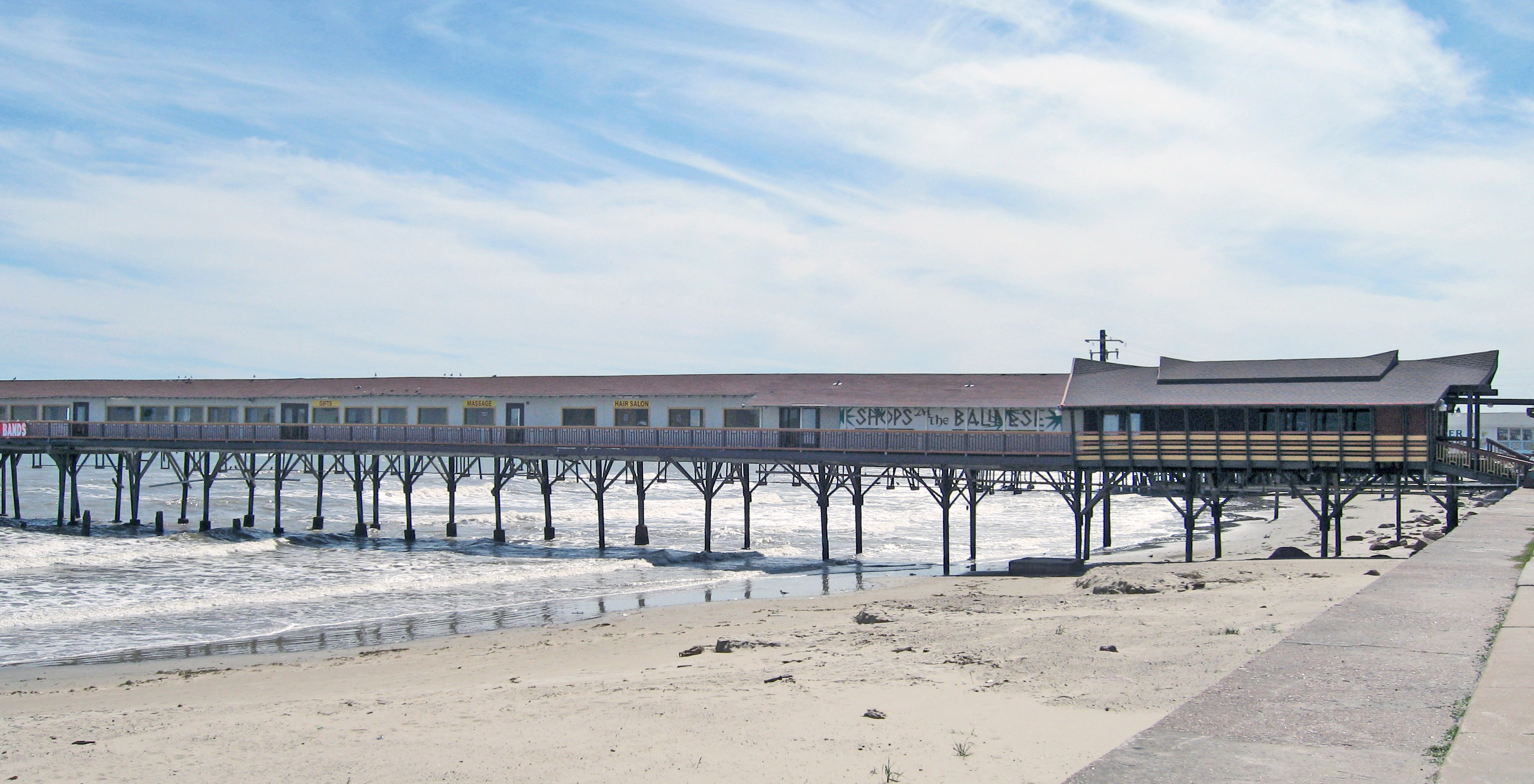
The Balinese Room, a former club and casino, once at the forefront of Galveston's nightlife

With the onset of World War II, pressure to eliminate vice, particularly in communities containing military bases, intensified. San Antonio's "Sporting District," once one of the largest red-light districts in the nation, was closed in 1941. Most remaining "open" vice districts in Texas' major cities were closed during this same period.

San Antonio, Houston, and Dallas continued to be significant vice dens though their activities were not conducted as openly as in the past. The most successful exception to the trend toward closing down vice in Texas was Galveston. Vice-based tourism continued to operate successfully on the island into the 1950s. Federal authorities scored some victories against the Galveston's vice during the late 1930s (notably the closing of the famed Hollywood Dinner Club), but gambling and prostitution continued openly with the support of the community.

Houston also had some major open gambling venues as late as the 1950s. One of the most important facilitators of these gambling rackets was "Fat Jack" Halfen, an organized crime boss with connections to the Chicago and Dallas mafia who paid off city and county officials. Notorious gambler Jakie Freedman created one of Houston's most famous casinos, the "Domain Privee", an exclusive club inside Freedman's mansion. Freedman ran bookmaking and other gambling enterprises in the city, eventually being referred to as the "prince of Houston gambling" by author George Fuermann. He became so wealthy that his decision not to withdraw his money from Houston's First National Bank, one of the state's oldest financial institutions, is credited with saving the bank from collapse during the Depression.

Dallas-area crime boss Benny Binion ran a famous casino known as the Top O' Hill Terrace in Arlington, as well as a horsetrack. These venues, in addition to other smaller ones in Arlington, attracted celebrities from around the nation. In the 1940s the Chicago Outfit attempted to make in-roads into the Dallas gambling scene which meant they had to push out Binion and win over the local police who propped him up. Paul Roland Jones was dispatched to Dallas to try and strike a deal with the local police but he was caught in a sting. After the jailing of Jones, the Outfit sent more men to continue their efforts. However they were met as they stepped off the plane by County Sheriff Bill Decker and Captain J. W. Fritz who deported them.

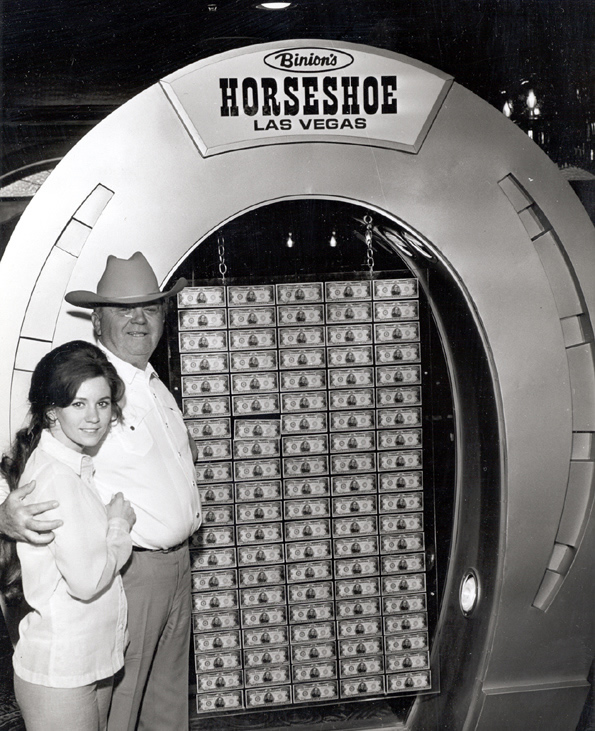
Benny Binion, WW II-era mob boss of Dallas, in Las Vegas (c. 1969)

Though during the early 20th century gambling had been mostly illegal throughout the nation, Nevada legalized gambling in 1931. Initially this development sparked minimal national attention but during the 1940s the city of Las Vegas had begun to attract interest from gaming figures around the country. As tolerance of illegal gambling and other vice in Texas gradually waned and crackdowns on vice by state and local officials increased, many gaming leaders in the state began to move their operations to the Nevada desert becoming instrumental in the city's development. In 1942, Dallas theater magnate R. E. Griffith opened the Hotel Last Frontier, the second major casino to be built in Las Vegas and the most luxurious until the 1950s. Galveston's Sam Maceo became a major investor and facilitator for Moe Dalitz's Desert Inn, which opened in 1950. Houston's Jakie Freedman opened the Sands Hotel and Casino in 1952 at a cost of $5.5 million ($66.7 million in today's terms). Benny Binion was a partner in the Las Vegas Club and opened the Binion's Horseshoe casino. Galveston's American National Insurance Company helped to finance much of the development Las Vegas and was even investigated for its connections to organized crime.

By the 1950s, Galveston, the last great gambling center in Texas, was crumbling under pressure from state authorities. The Maceo brothers had exited the gambling business in Galveston, and the Fertittas, who had taken over, could not maintain the influence over the island that the Maceos had. Non-vice crime on the island grew and Galveston became a haven for criminals from other parts of the country. State and county officials launched large-scale operations to shut down open gambling and prostitution throughout the state. During the 1950s, problems with prostitution and other vice were reported on much more heavily than in the past reflecting new attitudes of intolerance toward the practice. By the end of the decade the era of these open vice dens in Texas was mostly over. Galveston was among the most affected cities by this as its economy had been heavily dependent on the tourism generated by open vice. Its economy became stagnant for many years afterward.

Though prostitution still existed in Texas, by 1960 the practice had declined to levels far below the peak between the World Wars. Rather than attempting to fully eradicate prostitution, public officials focused efforts on eliminating street prostitution and other more visible forms of the practice, as well as severing ties to organized crime.

== Recent times ==
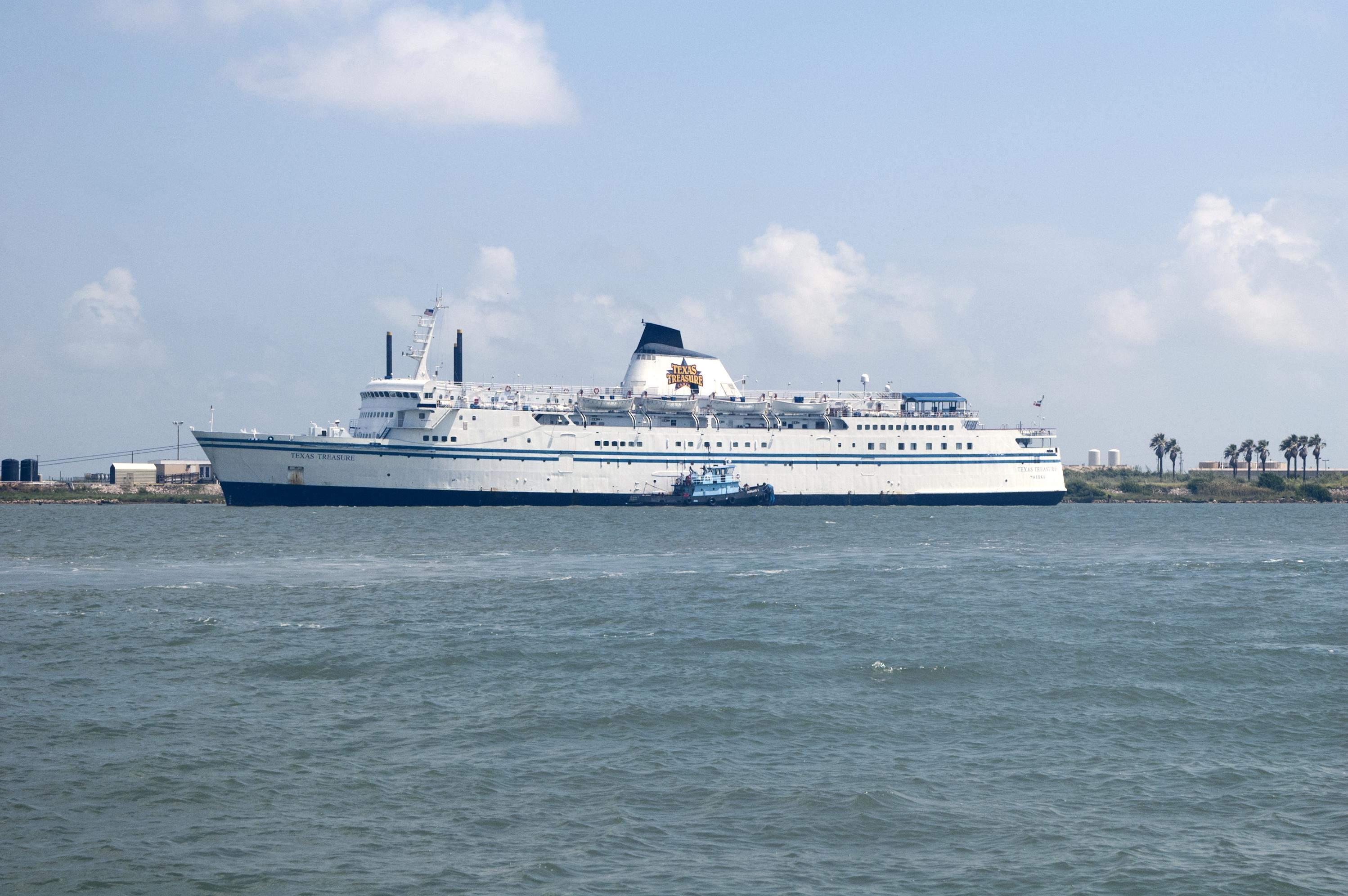
The Texas Treasure casino ship, seen in Port Aransas in 2007

By the mid-20th century, most major vice activities were being actively targeted by law enforcement in the state. Though alcohol sale and consumption was legalized, in many areas it was still substantially restricted and, even today, some counties in the state remain dry or retain significant restrictions. Most other activities went underground and have remained largely hidden. In 1969, major legislation was enacted directed at alcohol and narcotics. The Implied Consent law was passed requiring that drivers agree to breath tests when arrested for suspicion of driving while intoxicated. Statutes against narcotics were strengthened giving police and prosecutors more ability to target offenders.

Prostitution, which once was largely a cottage industry run by madams, has increasingly become run by pimps and figures who engage in white slavery and other abusive practices. Regulation of prostitution for health standards and for protection of the workers has become virtually non-existent.

Narcotics have become an increasingly serious issue nationwide with Texas becoming an important port of entry resulting from its proximity to Mexico. Illegal drugs shipped through the state supply a large portion of the nation stretching from the Midwest to the Southeast. In the 1980s the seriousness of the problem led to the Texas National Guard adding drug law enforcement to its duties to supplement the U.S. Drug Enforcement Administration and the Texas Department of Public Safety.

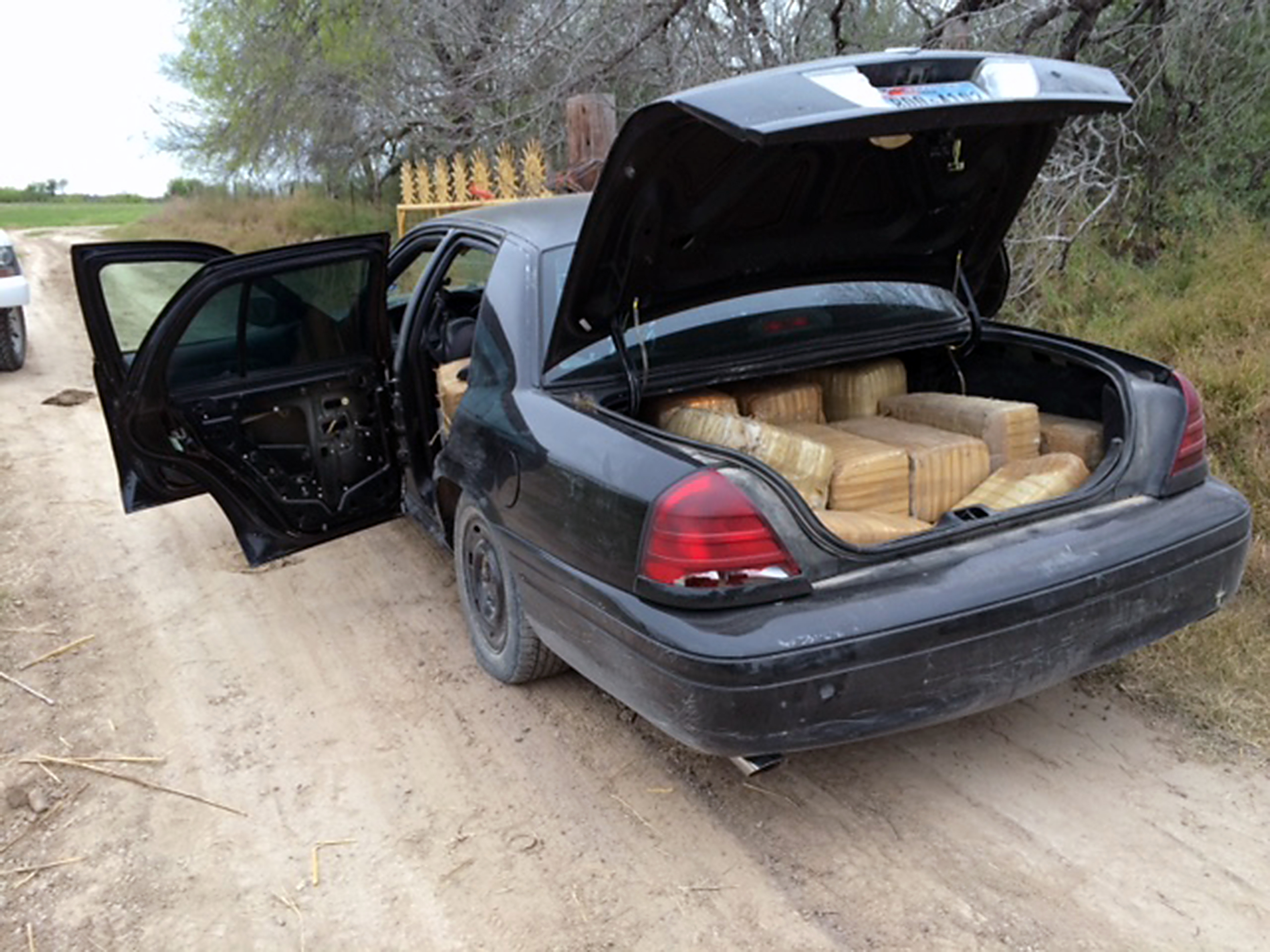
2015 Border Patrol seizure of cannabis in the Rio Grande Valley

Two of the biggest narcotics enterprises affecting Texas are the Sinaloa and Juárez Cartels, though the Juárez Cartel has weakened since the late 1990s. As of 2008 DEA authorities regularly seize shipments of drug proceeds en route to Mexico that can amount to millions of dollars at a time. Apart from the direct problems associated with narcotics, drug-related violence throughout the state has become an increasingly serious issue.

The later 20th century saw a relaxing of national sentiments against gambling. In 1987, Texas voters in a referendum chose to allow parimutuel wagering within the state. In 1991, voters approved a constitutional amendment authorizing a state lottery, which began operation in 1992. The Texas Lottery rapidly became one of the largest in the nation; it joined the Mega Millions consortium in 2003 and Powerball in 2010. In 1987, the U.S. Supreme Court recognized the right of Native American tribes to establish gambling parlors within their jurisdiction. In 1993, the Tigua tribe opened a casino in El Paso, despite the objections of the governor's office. It became the subject of major court battles before being shut down. In 1996, the Kickapoo tribe opened a casino in Eagle Pass near the Mexico border. Until recently it was the only casino legally recognized by the state though others are today open as well. Changes to state laws in the late 1980s made it possible for gambling cruise ships to come to Texas ports. They are today a regular facet of tourism in Texas.

In contrast to some other parts of the country, society in Texas has shunned most memories of the vice dens and vice leaders of the early twentieth century. While nineteenth century figures such as Roy Bean and Doc Holliday are celebrated icons of the Old West, later business leaders such as the Maceos and Benny Binion are mostly unknown by the general public, in contrast to, for example, Chicago's Al Capone and New York's Carlo Gambino.

== Notable historical vice destinations ==
=== Hell's Half Acre (Fort Worth) ===
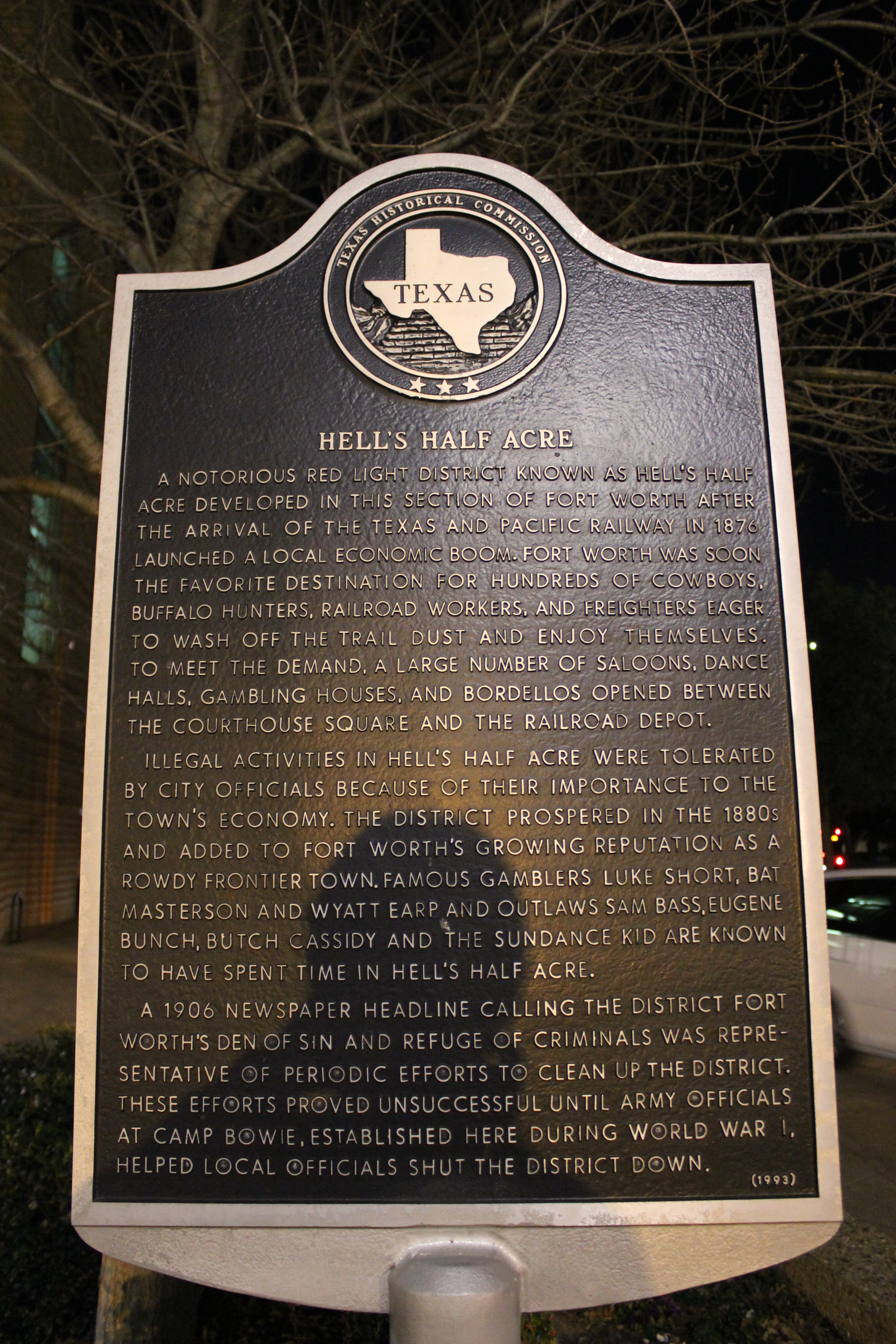
Texas historical marker

Though Hell's Half Acre became a popular euphemism for red-light districts throughout Texas, the most well-known district to use this name was the one in Fort Worth. The area developed in the 1870s as a rest stop on the cattle trails from Texas through Kansas. It quickly became populated with saloons, brothels, and other vice dens offering gambling, liquor, and prostitutes.

The Acre soon became known for its violence and lawlessness, and was sometimes referred to as the town's "Bloody Third Ward." It became a hide-out for thieves and violent criminals such as Sam Bass. This led to crackdowns by law enforcement though they rarely interfered with the gambling and other vice operations in the area. The commercially successful area grew reaching its height in the late 19th century when it covered 2.5 acres (0.010 km^{2}) of the city. The Acre was an important source of income for the town, and despite outside pressures against the illegal activities, Fort Worth officials were reluctant to take action.

The major complaints against the area within the community were primarily against the dance halls and brothels, which reformers saw as the most immoral, as well as the general violence. The saloons and gambling halls were generally less of a concern. In 1889, following serious bouts of violence in the city, officials shut down many of the activities that were deemed as most directly contributing to the violence. By the start of the 20th century, the Acre's popularity as a destination for out-of-town visitors had diminished dramatically. The Progressive movement of the early 20th century put increasing pressure on the area until it was shut down in 1917.

=== Crystal and Iron Front Saloons ===
Two bars, the Crystal Saloon and Iron Front Saloon, were located at the corner of Congress Avenue and Pecan Street in Austin. The two saloons, along with others nearby, were a center for the local night life scene and ran gambling businesses. Above the Iron Front was a popular gambling hall run by Austin's city marshall.

In 1910, the saloons were torn down as part of civic efforts at improving the community.

=== Sporting District (San Antonio) ===
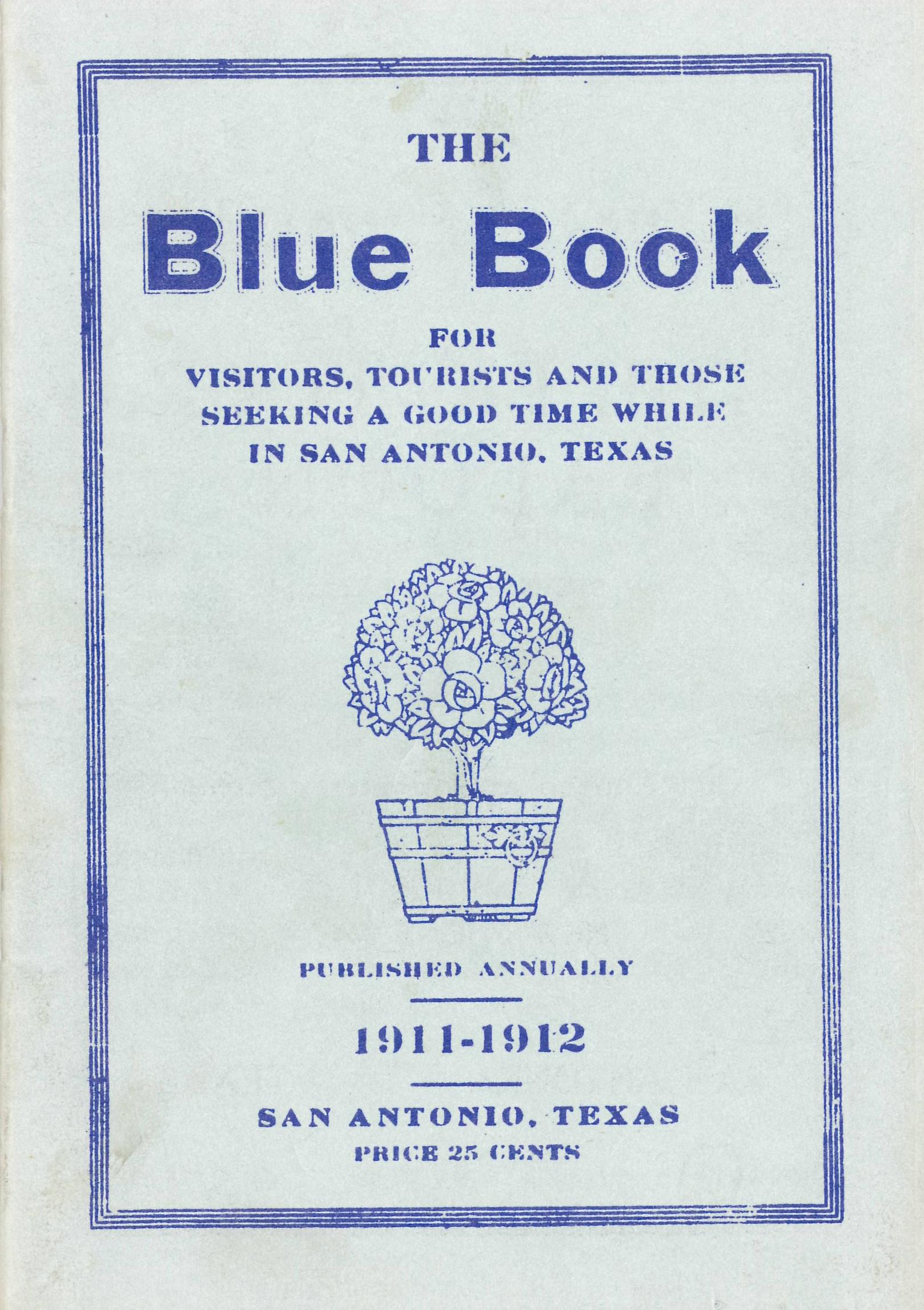
The 1911–1912 Blue Book, a tourist guide to San Antonio's Sporting District

The San Antonio red-light district known as the "Sporting District" was established in 1889 by the city council to contain and regulate prostitution. The area became home to brothels, dance halls, saloons, gambling parlors, and other illegal, or at least vice-oriented, businesses. City officials did not officially condone the activities but rather unofficially regulated them. The area also included many legitimate businesses including hotels and restaurants.

By the early 20th century, the District had become so large that, not only was it the largest red-light district in Texas, but it was one of the largest in the nation. Indeed, by some accounts it was the nation's third largest but also the most civilized. Businesses in the area provided the city with $50,000 ($1.73 million in today's terms) annually in licensing fees. The most successful brothels boasted amenities such as ballrooms and orchestras. Due to the area's size, a "Blue Book" was published as a tourist guide for visitors. The 1911-1912 edition listed 106 vice entertainment venues as well as many other businesses.

An unusual facet of San Antonio's red-light district compared to other cities was the lack of segregation in this area. Despite the general segregation that permeated society in Texas around the start of the 20th century, establishments in the Sporting District generally catered to black men just as much as "white" men.

The District was finally shut down in 1941 by Dwight D. Eisenhower, who commanded Fort Sam Houston.

=== Chicken Ranch ===
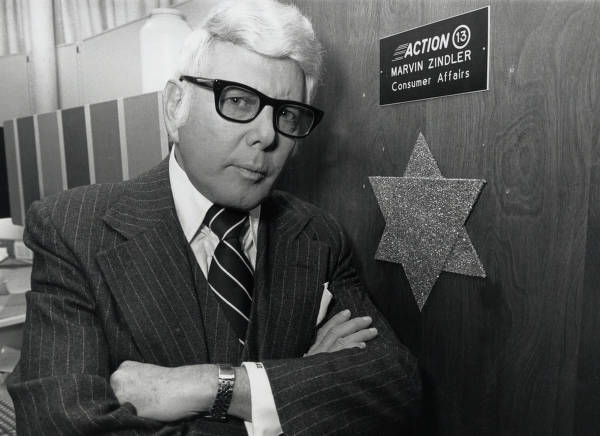
Houston journalist Marvin Zindler whose reporting led to the closure of the Chicken Ranch

In 1905, Jessie Williams, known as "Miss Jessie," bought a small house in La Grange and opened a brothel. Williams maintained a good relationship with local law enforcement and ensured that her house was respectable by excluding drunkards and admitting politicians and lawmen. After receiving word of an imminent crusade against the red-light district, Williams sold her house and purchased 10 acres (40,000 m^{2}) just outside the city limits of La Grange. Business developed steadily particularly during World War I, and the nondescript house was gradually expanded as business grew.

During the Great Depression, Williams was forced to lower the prices she charged to the point that she implemented the "poultry standard," charging one chicken for each sexual act. The number of chickens at the brothel exploded, and soon the nickname "Chicken Ranch" was born. Williams supplemented her income by selling surplus chickens and eggs. As the Depression ended, the brothel returned to a cash basis and prospered, with lines of men at the door each weekend. In the 1950s Williams turned over the operation to a young prostitute named Edna Milton.

The Chicken Ranch, which had operated for decades with the knowledge of state and local authorities, was finally closed in 1973 by these same authorities after a scandalous report by Houston reporter Marvin Zindler. The Ranch's notoriety following the scandal made it one of the most famous brothels in U.S. history. Its fame later became the inspiration for the 1973 ZZ Top song, "La Grange", the 1978 Broadway musical The Best Little Whorehouse in Texas, and its 1982 film adaptation.

=== Free State of Galveston ===
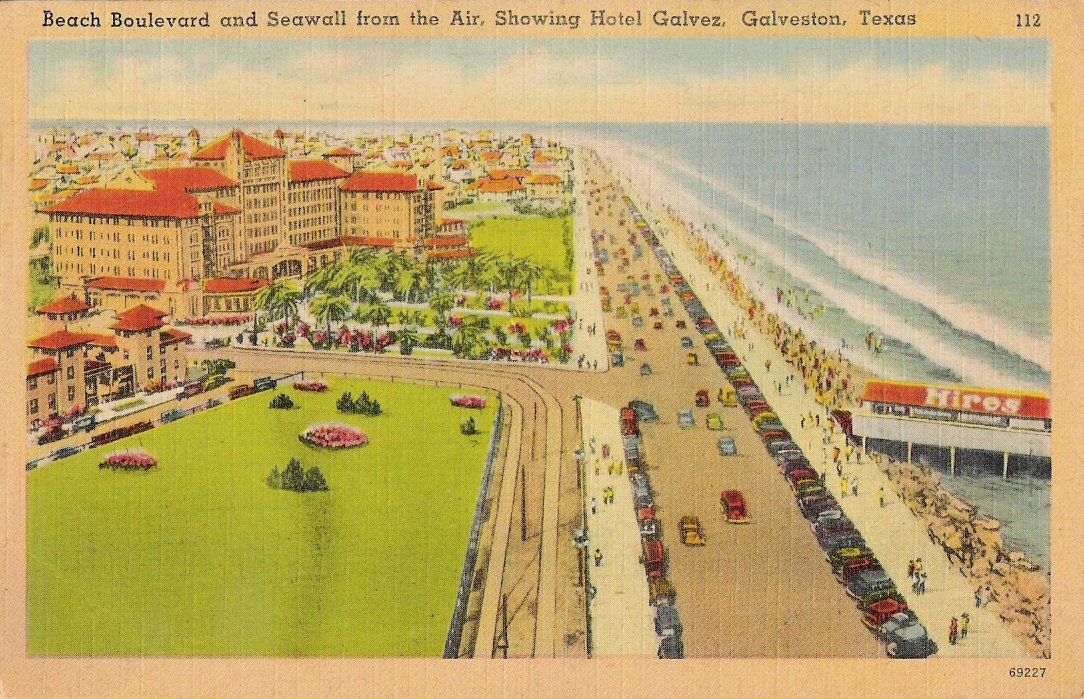
Postcard view of Beach Boulevard and the Hotel Galvez, early 1940s

During the 19th century Galveston had become one of the largest shipping centers, but the Galveston Hurricane of 1900 destroyed much of the city and made outside investors leery of continuing to put money into the island. Attempting to diversify away from shipping, business leaders tried various means of reviving tourism and establishing new enterprises such as insurance. As with most larger communities in Texas, gambling and prostitution were common. By early 1900s local criminal gangs ran gambling and other illegal enterprises. With the advent of Prohibition in 1920, Galveston quickly became one of the major U.S. ports of entry for illegal liquor supplying cities in Texas and the Midwest. Revenue generated by the liquor trade helped finance expansion of gambling in the city.

During the mid-1920s, two brothers, Sam and Rosario Maceo, managed to take control of the island's underworld. The brothers quickly made the island a nationally known tourist destination with gambling, liquor, and prostitution as the island's core attractions. Though prostitution was mostly confined to Postoffice Street, gambling and liquor were ubiquitous throughout the island. Galveston featured some of the nation's most elegant clubs (which had casinos as their main attractions) and hosted major entertainment figures from around the nation. Lax attitudes among the citizens, city officials, and even county officials led to the island being referred to humorously as the "Free State of Galveston".

Even as vice and red-light districts were shut down in most Texas cities from the 1910s to the 1940s, Galveston's vice-based tourism continued to thrive. As Las Vegas began to develop in the late 1940s, the Maceos moved to re-establish their empire in the new desert gaming center. Galveston began to decline without their influence and finally state and county authorities shut down gambling and prostitution on the island in 1957. Tourism crashed, taking the rest of the island's economy with it and the city entered a long period of stagnation.

== Notable individuals ==
There were numerous individuals instrumental in the legends that surround Texas' history of vice.

- Roy Bean - Saloon owner and justice of the peace in west Texas who became famous for his corruption and controversial rulings.
- Benny Binion - Dallas crime boss of the 1940s who ran the Top O' Hill Terrace in Arlington and went on to open Binion's Horseshoe Casino in Las Vegas.
- Lottie Deno (Carlotta J. Thompkins) - Poker player in 19th-century San Antonio and Fort Worth, arguably the most famous player of the era.
- Ben Dowell - First mayor of El Paso who opened his namesake saloon in the 19th century becoming the most famous in West Texas and New Mexico.
- Jakie Freedman - Owner of the Domain Privee, the famed Houston casino of post-WWII era. He went on to open the Sands Hotel and Casino in Las Vegas.
- "Fat Jack" Halfen - Houston crime boss of the mid-20th century that organized most gambling rackets in the city.
- Jack Harris - San Antonio businessman who established the Vaudeville Theater and Saloon in the 19th century. This business came to anchor the city's Sporting District.
- Sam and Rosario Maceo - Heads of the organization that established the island of Galveston as a gaming center that lasted into the 1950s.
- Carlo and Joseph Piranio - Founders of the Dallas crime family that ran bootlegging and gaming in Dallas until the 1970s.
- Fannie Porter - Bordello madam in San Antonio in the late 19th century. Her brothel was the city's most famous and a hide-out for Butch Cassidy's Wild Bunch.
- Ben Thompson - Well-known gambler and co-proprietor of the Austin's Iron Front Saloon who managed the saloon's successful gambling operations. Despite being known for his violent behavior, he was elected for a time as Austin's city marshal.
- Jessie Williams - Bordello madam in La Grange in the early 20th century. Her brothel came to be known as the Chicken Ranch, arguably the most famous in Texas' history.

== See also ==
- Gambling in Texas
- Prohibition in the United States
- Cannabis in Texas
