= Della Moore =

American prostitute and girlfriend of Kid Curry

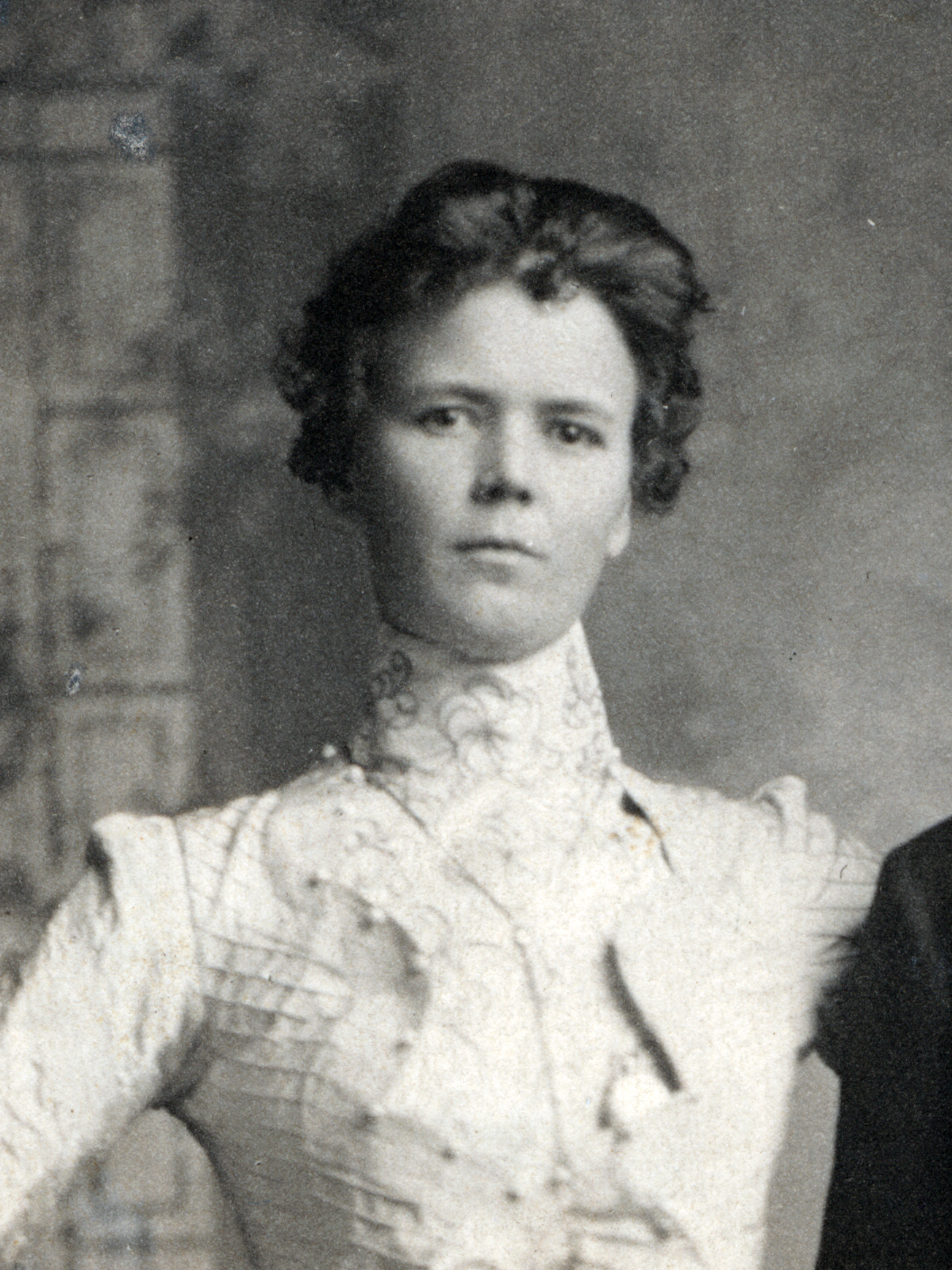
- Della Moore using alias of Annie Rogers
- Born: c. 1880; Near El Paso, Texas
- Died: c. 1926 (aged 45–46)
- Other names: Annie Rogers, Maude Williams

Della Moore (1880–1926?), also known as Annie Rogers or Maude Williams, was a woman working as a prostitute during the closing years of the Old West, best known for being the girlfriend of outlaw Harvey Logan (Kid Curry), who rode with Butch Cassidy's Wild Bunch gang.

== Early life and life with Curry ==
Little is known about Moore's early years. She is believed to have been born around 1880 in Texas near El Paso. She was pretty, with a petite build, and began working in brothels in Mena, Arkansas, Fort Worth and San Antonio around the age of 15. By 1899, she was working in the famous brothel of Madame Fannie Porter, having met and becoming involved with Curry some time around mid-1898. She would help hide Curry after his robberies, and often helped him resupply before he would leave again.

By 1900, Moore had left prostitution and began traveling with Curry, who was between robberies. The two traveled to Tennessee where they met with other members of the gang to include Ben Kilpatrick and Laura Bullion. On October 14, 1901, Moore was arrested in Nashville, Tennessee for passing notes associated with an earlier robbery Curry had committed. She and Curry never saw one another again. She was jailed, but was later acquitted on June 18, 1902.

There is no evidence to suggest that Moore and Curry reunited after her release from jail. Both Kilpatrick and Bullion were arrested in St. Louis, Missouri while she was incarcerated, and Curry killed two Knoxville policemen to avoid capture only one day after their capture. He was later captured, but escaped again. She traveled to Arkansas, where she returned to prostitution, and by the time that Curry was killed in Colorado by a posse in 1904, Moore had returned to Texas, and for a time, she worked again for Fannie Porter in her brothel. It is believed that she later became a teacher, dying around 1926, but that is unconfirmed. She often changed her name, and it is not known what path her life took after her involvement with Curry. It is unknown if they ever married.
