= Chicken Ranch (Texas) =

Former brothel in Texas

Coordinates: 29.91339°N 96.83475°W

The Chicken Ranch was an illegal brothel in the U.S. state of Texas that operated from 1905 until 1973 in Fayette County, about 2.5 miles (4.0 km) east of downtown La Grange.

It inspired the 1973 ZZ Top song "La Grange", and served as the basis for the 1978 Broadway musical The Best Little Whorehouse in Texas and its 1982 movie adaptation.

== Early history ==
The brothel that became the Chicken Ranch opened in La Grange, Texas in 1844. Run by a widow known as Mrs. Swine, the brothel operated in a hotel near the saloon, and featured three young women from New Orleans. The women under Swine's employment used the hotel lobby for entertaining, and rented a room upstairs for conducting business. The brothel was successful for over a decade, but closed during World War I when Swine and one of her prostitutes were forced to leave town as Yankees. After the war, prostitution was endemic in the local saloons, but no official records were kept.

== Miss Jessie Williams ==
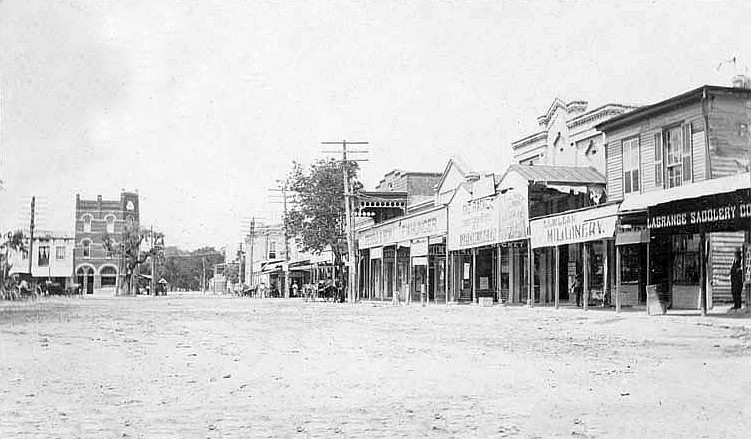
La Grange, Texas, in 1908

In 1905, Jessie Williams, known as Miss Jessie (although born Faye Stewart) bought a small house along the banks of the lower Colorado River and opened a brothel. Williams maintained a good relationship with local law enforcement: by excluding drunkards and admitting politicians and lawmen, she ensured that her house would be tolerated. In 1917, after learning of an imminent crusade against the red-light district, Williams sold her house and purchased ten acres (40,000 m^{2}) outside the city limits of La Grange, two blocks from the Houston–Austin highway. This was the final location of the Chicken Ranch.

In 1917, the Chicken Ranch began advertising. Under the direction of two sisters who worked in the house, the prostitutes sent packages and letters to local men fighting in World War I. The advertising, and an increase in automobile ownership, increased the traffic flow to the brothel, and new rooms were subsequently added to meet the increased demand. The brothel "looked like a typical Texas farmhouse, with whitewashed siding and a few side buildings," which held the chickens. The unlit brothel entrance was discreetly located at the back of the house, which featured 14 rooms. No external signage marked the brothel's presence within the house.

Every evening, the local sheriff Will Loessin would visit the Chicken Ranch to learn the latest gossip and whether any patrons had boasted of crimes. Many local crimes were solved with information gained from these visits. Sheriff Loessin often paced the halls, and, using an iron rod, would eject patrons of the brothel for abuses toward its employed prostitutes.

During the Great Depression, Williams was forced to lower her prices. As the Depression lingered, the number of customers dwindled and Williams had difficulty making ends meet for her employees. She implemented the "poultry standard", and charged one live chicken for each sexual act. The number of chickens at the brothel exploded, and soon the place became known as the Chicken Ranch. Williams supplemented her income by selling surplus chickens and eggs.

In 1946, Jim T. Flournoy took office as sheriff. He immediately had a direct telephone line installed at the Chicken Ranch so that he could continue his predecessor's practice of gathering intel from the brothel, without having to travel there each evening.

== Edna Milton ==
Williams began suffering from arthritis in the 1950s, and in 1952 a young prostitute named Edna Milton came to the ranch and eventually took on many of the day-to-day responsibilities of operating the brothel. After Williams died in 1961, Milton purchased the property, which she officially renamed Edna's Fashionable Ranch Boarding House. Milton maintained many of Williams's rules for the girls. They were prohibited from drinking or getting tattoos and were not allowed to socialize with the residents of La Grange. Before beginning their employment, the prostitutes were fingerprinted and photographed by Flournoy and underwent background checks. After beginning work, they were required to see the doctor in town weekly for a checkup. To encourage support from the townspeople, supplies were bought from local stores on a rotating basis. Milton also contributed to local civic causes, becoming one of La Grange's largest philanthropists.

The Chicken Ranch was highly successful. In the 1950s, it employed 16 prostitutes. On weekends there was often a line of men, mostly students or soldiers from nearby military bases, at the door. Students at Texas A&M University also made an unofficial tradition of sending freshmen to the Chicken Ranch for initiation. The Chicken Ranch was preferred because many of the girls were allegedly students at the University of Texas.

Each prostitute would have between five and 20 customers per day. In the 1950s, they charged $15 for 15 minutes ($180 in today's terms). The employees were required to give 75% of their earnings to Milton, who paid for all of their living and medical expenses. At its peak in the 1960s, it earned more than $500,000 per year ($5.11 million in today's terms), with the prostitutes keeping an additional $300 per week for themselves ($3,100 in today's terms).

Edna Milton Chadwell died in Phoenix, Arizona at age 82 on February 25, 2012.

== Closure ==
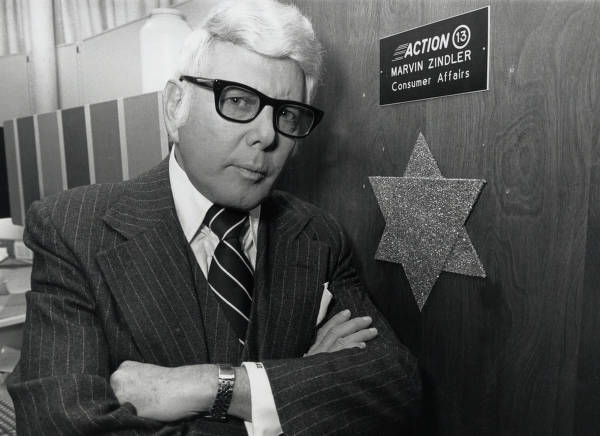
Houston journalist Marvin Zindler whose reporting led to the closure of the Chicken Ranch

In November 1972, the Texas Department of Public Safety (DPS) surveilled the Chicken Ranch for two days, documenting 484 people entering the rural brothel. At the request of a member of the DPS intelligence team, local law enforcement closed the Chicken Ranch for a short time. It reopened, and in July 1973, Houston television reporter Marvin Zindler began an investigation of the Chicken Ranch. Zindler claimed for many years that he began the investigation because of an anonymous tip. Governor Dolph Briscoe closed the operation, only to have it open again after a few months. Zindler then shed more light on the operation, which led to its being permanently closed.

Now, 25 years ago I told a little fib when I said I got into the act because of an anonymous tip. The tip was actually a phone call from the office of the Texas Attorney General John Hill. Hill asked the chief of his organized crime division Tim James to get me involved in closing the Chicken Ranch.

— Marvin Zindler in a 2005 interview

Tim James was in the office when Hill asked Fayette County District Attorney Oliver Kitzman to close the Chicken Ranch. Hill explained the interest the DPS and the Attorney General had in seeing that any organized crime was shut down. According to James, Kitzman responded: "There's nothing that the people in this county want to do about it, Mr. Hill. There's nothing that we're going to do about it. It's not of great concern to the people who've elected me." According to James, Kitzman then stated that he would investigate anyone that Hill sent to his district. The attorney general then suggested that Zindler be called.

James called Zindler in the hopes that the television personality could apply the right kind of pressure to get it shut down. Zindler interviewed Kitzman, who admitted to knowing about the Chicken Ranch, but claimed that he never had tried to close down the brothel because "we have never had any indication by anyone that these places are a problem to law enforcement." Sheriff Jim T. Flournoy, who had been overseeing the La Grange area for 27 years, denied that the Chicken Ranch was involved in organized crime and denied that he had been bribed to keep the place open. Zindler approached Governor Dolph Briscoe about the matter. After a very brief investigation, which found no evidence of a link to organized crime, Briscoe and Hill ordered the Chicken Ranch to be closed permanently.

On August 1, 1973, Flournoy called Milton and told her that she was no longer allowed to operate. A handmade sign on the building blamed Zindler for the closing. Flournoy then went to Austin to meet with the governor, armed with a petition opposing the closure and carrying 3,000 signatures. Governor Briscoe refused to meet with him.

== Legacy ==
For two years after the Chicken Ranch was closed, potential customers continued to arrive. The house was purchased by two Houston lawyers. In 1977, part of the house and the original furniture were moved to Dallas, where it was opened as a restaurant, with Milton as the hostess; the restaurant closed a year later. In 1979, Milton opened a bar on Lemmon Avenue in Dallas also named The Chicken Ranch; the bar operated for a short period and closed a year later.

The Chicken Ranch remained in the public consciousness after its final closure. A 1974 Playboy article on the brothel inspired Larry L. King (the article’s author), Peter Masterson, and Carol Hall to develop the musical The Best Little Whorehouse in Texas. The musical debuted on Broadway in 1978 and was an unexpected success, running until 1982 and winning two Tony Awards. In 1982, the movie based on the musical was released, also becoming an unexpected success.

== See also ==
- History of vice in Texas
- Miss Hattie's Bordello
