= Fannie Porter =

American madam (born 1873)

- Born: February 1873; England
- Died: 1940 (aged 66–67); El Paso, Texas
- Resting place: Natchez City Cemetery
- Occupations: Brothel and boarding house owner
- Known for: Operating the most popular brothel in the Old West

Fannie Porter (February 1873 — 1940) was a well-known madam in 19th-century Texas in the United States. She is best known for her famous San Antonio brothel and her association with several famous outlaws of the day.

== Career as a madam ==
Porter was born in England and traveled to the United States around the age of one with her family. By age 15, she was working as a prostitute in San Antonio, Texas. By the age of 20, she had started her own brothel at the corner of Durango and San Saba streets, better known as the Sporting District.

By 1895, Porter's brothel was one of the more popular in the Old West. Her business drew notorious outlaws of the day as well as with lawmen. She was well respected for her discretion with clients, always refusing to turn in a wanted outlaw to the authorities.

Porter was known to select only the most beautiful women, all ages 18 to 25. She employed anywhere from five to eight girls, all of whom lived and worked inside her brothel. Her "girls" were required to practice good hygiene and maintain an immaculate personal appearance. Porter was known for being extremely defensive of her "girls", insisting that any who mistreated them never return to her brothel.

Butch Cassidy, the Sundance Kid, Kid Curry, and other members of the Wild Bunch gang frequented her business. William Pinkerton, of the Pinkerton National Detective Agency, visited her.

Della Moore, one of Porter's "girls", became the girlfriend of Kid Curry, remaining with him until her arrest for passing money from one of his robberies (she was arrested but acquitted, eventually returning to work for Porter once again).

Lillie Davis, another of her "girls", became involved with outlaw and Wild Bunch member Will "News" Carver. She later claimed she had married Carver in Fort Worth before he died in 1901, but no records to verify the alleged marriage.

The Sundance Kid and his girlfriend, Etta Place, whose true identity and eventual disappearance from history has long been a mystery, first met while she worked for Porter, but this may have never been confirmed. Wild Bunch gang member Laura Bullion is believed to have worked for Porter between 1898 and 1901.

In 1899, Porter's lease was canceled by the owner of the building, Luther Bounds, who was expanding his gambling and saloon business. Porter then devised what is believed to be the first "call service", in Texas for prostitutes by managing a network of runners and delivery boys to carry requests and telegrams for girls back and forth from local saloons, telegraph offices and casinos to her rented room at a boarding house, from where she would assign girls based on her knowledge of the client.

By the early 20th century, the tide had begun to turn against active, openly operating brothels. Porter had been arrested in 1888 and 1891, but the investigation into her affiliation with the Wild Bunch and a canceled lease led her to move her operations to her home in 1901.

Eventually, Porter retired and faded from history. It is not known where she went after her retirement. Most agree that she retired semi-wealthy. Some stories indicate that she married a man of wealth, some indicate she retired into seclusion, and others indicate she returned to England. None of those are confirmed. Later rumors indicated that she lived until 1940, when she was killed in a car accident in El Paso, Texas. However, this also is not certain.

== Gallery ==
Selected employees of Porter
Etta Place with the Sundance Kid

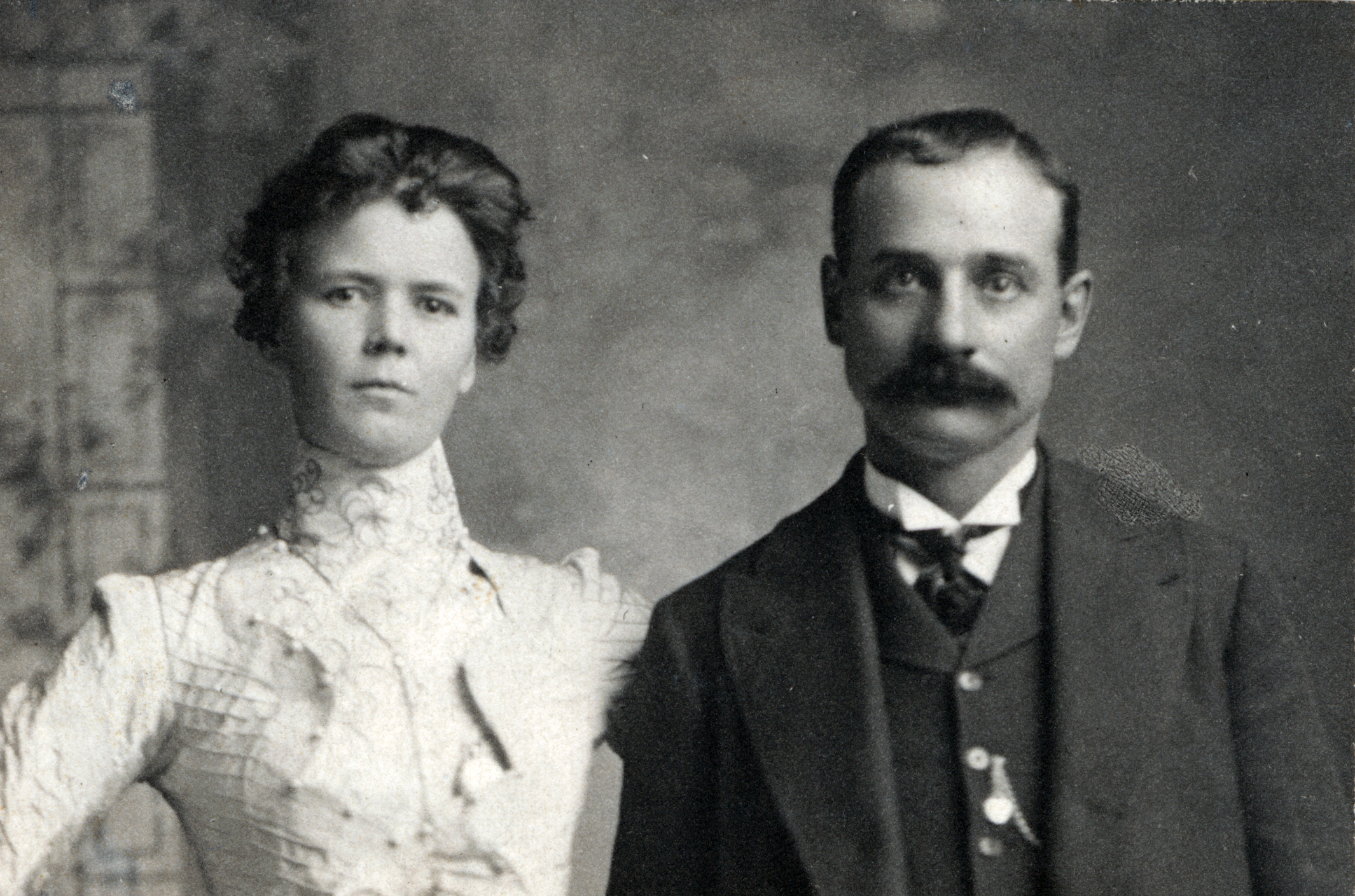
Della Moore (a.k.a. Annie Rogers, Maude Williams) with Logan

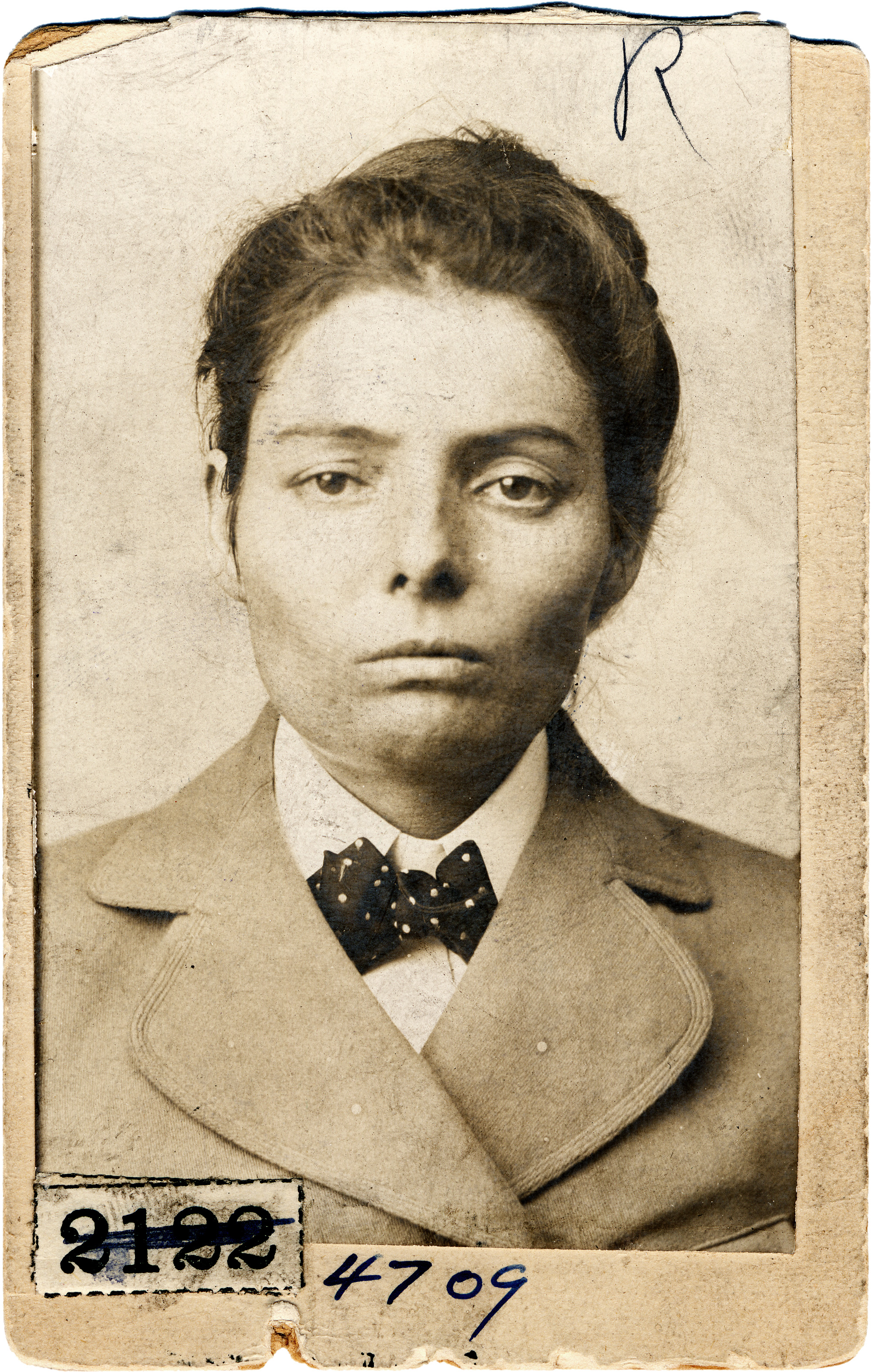
Laura Bullion
