= George Wright =

George Wright may refer to:

== Politics, law and government ==
- George Wright (MP) (died 1557), MP for Bedford and Wallingford
- George Wright (governor) (1779–1842), Canadian politician, lieutenant governor of Prince Edward Island
- George Wright (jurist) (1917–1975), Australian judge
- George Wright (lawyer) (1847–1913), Solicitor General for Ireland
- George Wright (trade unionist), National Secretary of Australian Labor Party
- George F. Wright (1881–1938), American politician, mayor of Honolulu
- George G. Wright (1820–1896), United States senator from Iowa
- George Melendez Wright (1904–1936), American biologist, National Park Service
- George Merrill Wright (1865–?), American businessman and politician
- George Washington Wright (1816–1885), United States congressman from California
- George Wright (Jamaican politician), Jamaican member of parliament

== Sports ==
- George Wright (shortstop) (1847–1937), American baseball player/manager, also active in golf and tennis
- George Wright (footballer, born 1919) (1919–?), English football goalkeeper
- George Wright (footballer, born 1930) (1930–2000), English football player
- George Wright (footballer, born 1969), Scottish football player (Heart of Midlothian FC)
- George Wright (New Zealand footballer), New Zealand international football (soccer) player
- George Wright (American football) (born 1947), NFL player
- George Wright (outfielder) (born 1958), American baseball player
- George Wright (triple jumper) (born 1963), Canadian triple jumper
- George Wright (1900s infielder) (1882–?), pre-Negro leagues baseball player
- George Wright (bowls) (1893–1949), English bowls player
- Bert Wright (footballer) (George Albert Wright, 1920–2000), English soccer player

== Others ==
- George Wright (artist) (1860–1944), British artist noted for his sporting and coaching scenes.
- George Wright (bishop) (1873–1956), Anglican bishop
- George Wright (fugitive) (born 1943), Portuguese criminal, alleged hijacker of Delta Air Lines Flight 841 in 1972
- George Wright (general) (1803–1865), American soldier and Civil War General
- George Wright (organist) (1920–1998), American organist
- George Wright (priest), Anglican priest in Ireland
- George Wright (psychologist) (born 1952), British psychologist
- George Caleb Wright (1889–1973), American architect
- G. Ernest Wright (1909–1974), American biblical scholar and archaeologist
- George Frederick Wright (1838–1921), American geologist and professor
- George Hand Wright (1872–1951), American painter, illustrator and printmaker
- George Henry Wright (1849–1912), Nova Scotian businessperson, social reformer and Titanic victim
- George Newenham Wright (c. 1794–1877), Anglo-Irish author and Anglican clergyman
- G. S. Wright (George Speller Wright, 1845–1935), South Australian banker
