= Denis P. Galvin =

- Born: March 17, 1938 (age 88); Boston, Massachusetts
- Occupations: National Park Service, Deputy Director
- Spouse: Martha Galvin
- Children: 2

Denis P. Galvin is a career government administrator, who served as Deputy Director, and as Acting Director, of the U.S. National Park Service.

== Early life and education ==
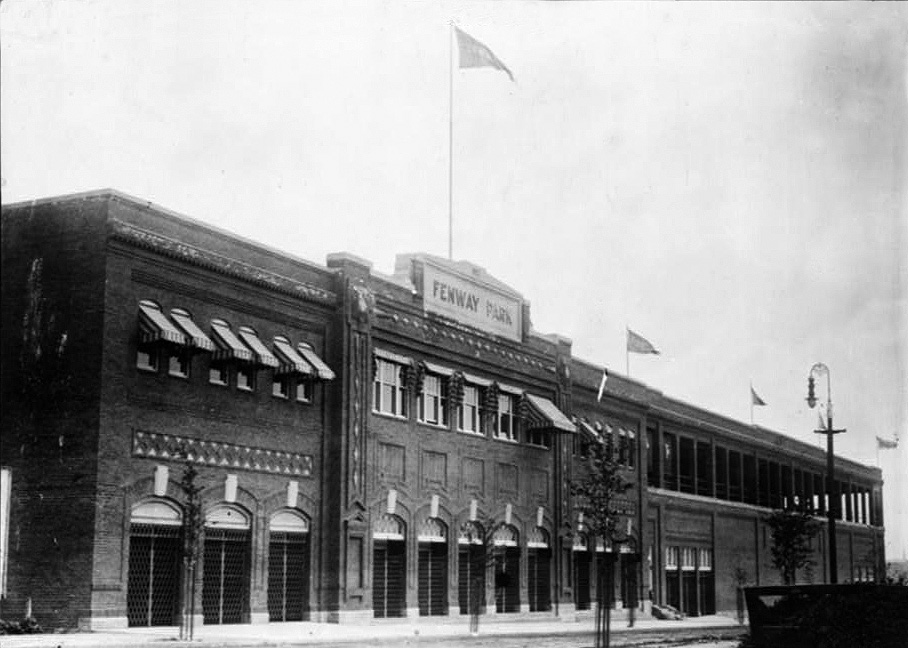
Boston's Historic Fenway Park

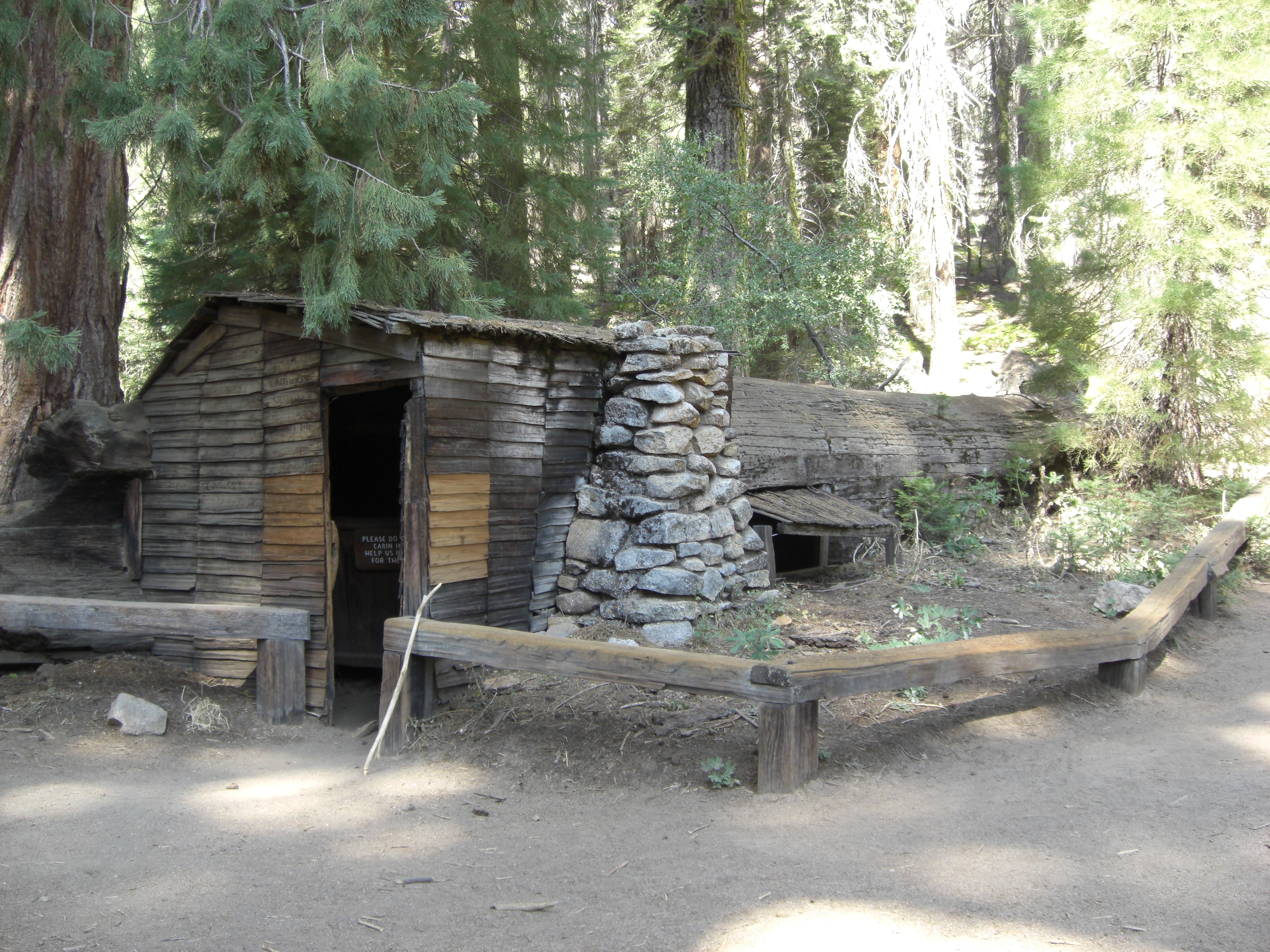
Historic Cabin in Sequoia Nat'l. Park

Galvin is a native of South Boston, where he was born into a blue-collar, Irish immigrant family in 1938. While still in school there, he worked part-time at Fenway Park selling hot dogs, which carried with it the fringe benefit of free admission to Red Sox games. In 1960, he graduated with a degree in engineering from Northeastern University.

After graduation, he served a two-year stint in the Peace Corps in Tanganyika in East Africa. Upon returning to the United States, he took his first position with the National Park Service (NPS) in 1963, as a Civil Engineer at Sequoia National Park in California.

== National Park Service career ==
Seal of United States Department of the Interior

NPS Emblem

Galvin went on to spend the rest of his career with the National Park Service (NPS), in the U.S. Department of the Interior—serving in various national parks and NPS regional offices, training centers, service centers, and the headquarters office in Washington, D.C. Over his 38-year NPS career, he worked as an engineer at Mount Rainier National Park, and in the Service's Southeast Regional Office in Atlanta; as a training specialist at the agency's Horace M. Albright Training Center in Grand Canyon; and as a management assistant at the New York District Office, overseeing park operations for a variety of NPS facilities in the New York City area.

In 1974, he was appointed Associate Regional Director for Operations for the NPS Northeast Regional Office in Boston, and, in 1976, became deputy director for that Region. Subsequently, for seven years beginning in 1978, he headed up the Service's large Denver Service Center, in Denver, Colorado, responsible for overseeing Park Planning, Design, Development and Construction in the National Park System nationwide.

In 1985, Galvin was appointed to the Service's second highest position as Deputy Director, and served in that and several other posts over the rest of his career in the NPS Headquarters office in Washington. He served as deputy director for a combined total of nine years, spanning the Reagan, Clinton, and George W. Bush Administrations.

During most of his tenure as deputy director, he was the highest ranking career government official in the Service. (Note: Until the appointment of Robert Stanton, another career official, as Director in August 1997.) As such, he was called upon to officially represent the Service in more than 200 formal Congressional hearings before the United States Congress on Capitol Hill. In his capacity as the Service's Deputy Director, he was called upon numerous times to serve as Acting Director, on occasion, for extended periods of time.

== Honors and awards ==
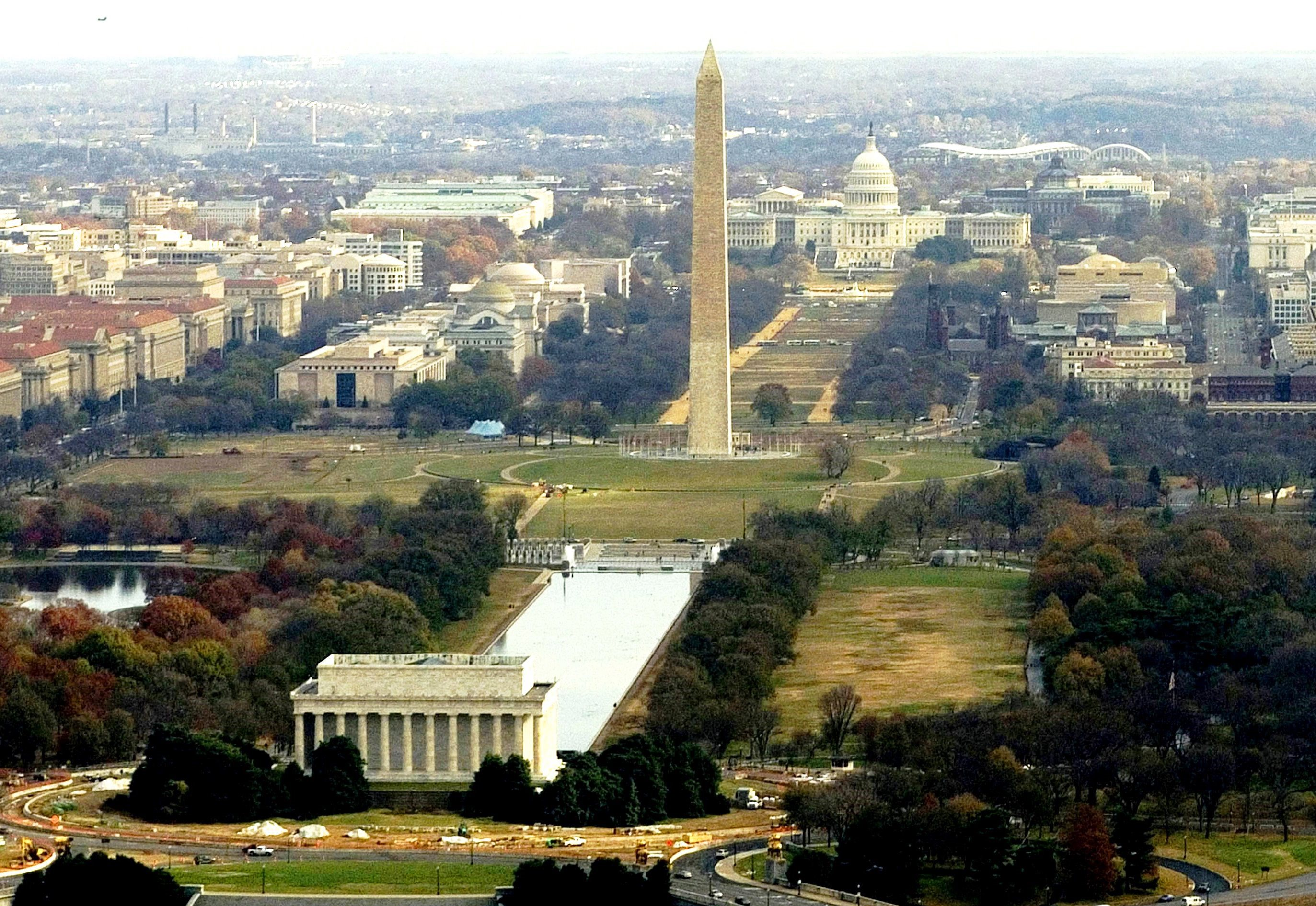
Washington, D.C. where NPS Headquarters is located within the U.S. Dept. of the Interior

In 1991, Galvin was awarded the national Pugsley Medal by the National Park Foundation, an award that honors "champions of parks and conservation."

In 2001, he received the Federal Government's Presidential Rank Award, "for exceptional achievement in the career Senior Executive Service," and in 2011 was elected a Fellow of the National Academy of Public Administration. In 2013, he was given the George Wright Society's George Melendez Wright Award, which cited his "distinguished lifetime record ... on behalf of America's national parks."

In 2024, he received an Honorary Membership from the Association of Landscape Architects (ASLA) for his service.

== Retirement ==
We who have shared National Park Service Careers know it is a struggle to protect resources for present and future generations against the clamor of competing uses and values. But if not us, who?

— Deny Galvin,
"Address to the Association of National Park Rangers",
December 8, 2005

Galvin retired from the National Park Service in 2002. Over his long NPS career, he had come to be widely respected and admired, both within and outside the agency, for his contributions to the America's National Parks. Then-NPS Director William Penn Mott Jr. had said of him in 1985, when announcing Galvin's appointment as Deputy Director: "He is . . . an effective, decisive leader whose work has drawn praise from both park professionals and interested observers outside of government." U.S. Congressman Nick J. Rahall II, upon the occasion of Galvin's retirement in 2002, said: "For many people, both within and outside of the National Park Service, Deny is 'Mr. Park Service'. ... It is heartening to see a civil servant who has exhibited such a love for his work."

Following his retirement, he continued to work in support of parks and conservation, and has on occasion still been asked to testify in Congress. He has also frequently been sought out by the media to comment on Park Service matters.

Writing for The George Wright Forum in 2007, in reference to the 1916 National Park Service Organic Act's mandate to "promote" Parks (and early Director Stephen Mather's view that they needed to be "widely used" if they were to be loved and supported by the American public), Galvin offered an expanded vision for the 21st Century: "There remains a need to promote the parks, not to bring people to them, but to promulgate the values they have come to represent."

In 2008–2009, he served as a member of the National Parks Conservation Association's Second Century Commission for the National Parks, co-chaired by former U.S. Senators Howard Baker and Bennett Johnston. He served as a consultant for the 2009 television documentary film, The National Parks: America's Best Idea.

Galvin is a contributor to the work of the Library of American Landscape History and serves as an adviser to the Coalition of National Park Service retirees; and is on the Board of Directors of the National Parks Conservation Association,
