= Louise Wright (illustrator) =

Fashion artist and illustrator

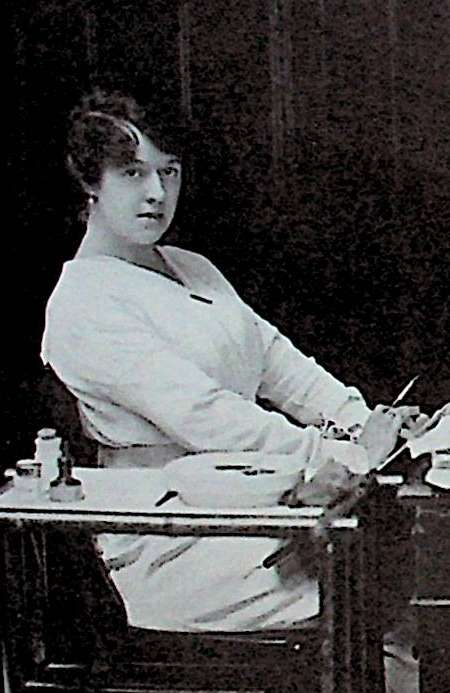
- Louise Wright sitting at her easel in 1917 or 1918
- Born: 5 September 1863; Leeds, Yorkshire, England
- Occupation: Fashion Illustrator
- Known for: Establishing the vogue for fashion catalogues

Signature
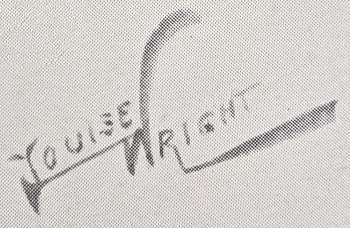

Louise Wright (born 5 September 1863) was a fashion illustrator. Four of her six siblings were also professional artists. They were all born in Leeds, and almost all of them later moved to London.

== Biography ==
Wright was born in Leeds, Yorkshire, England, on 5 September 1863, and baptised in Holbeck Parish, Leeds, on 7 October 1863. She is sometimes confused with the Louise Wright (b. 1875 Philadelphia, USA) who married John W. Wright (1857–1933), the watercolourist and etcher. (Note: Houfe's Dictionary of 19th Century British Book Illustrators and Caricaturists (1996) confuses the Leeds Louise Wright and the Philadelphia Louise Wright. His entry for Louise Wright provides biographical details for the Philadelphia Wright, but then links these to illustrations by the Leeds Wright, and to The Art of the Illustrator portfolio about the Leeds Louise Wright.)

Wright's father was George Edward Wright (24 February 1834 – 11 November 1916), an accountant and Elizabeth Scott (c. 1840 – 31 May 1916), the daughter or Thomas Scott (born c. 1804), variously a railway engineer and a commission agent. George Edward and Elizabeth had married on 22 August 1859 in St' Jude's Church at Hunslet, Leeds, Yorkshire, England.

George Edward Wright and Elizabeth Scott had seven children, five of whom were professional artists:

- George Wright, (30 June 1860 – 11 March 1944) a noted painter of hunting and coaching scenes. (Note: George married Rose Ellen Tribe (14 December 1864 – 13 November 1943) (Note: She gives her date of birth in the 1939 Register as 14 December 1864. However, her baptismal records show that she was baptised on 27 April 1864, and born on 14 December 1863.) of Leeds, the daughter of Edward Tribe, (born c.1817) a publican and Kezia Tribe (born c. 1925), on 30 March 1885 at the parish church of Wrangthorn, Yorkshire. The couple had two daughters: Florence Bensley Wright, born 16 December 1886.; Enid Wright, baptised 1 June 1888.)
- Louise Wright, the subject of this article.
- Mabel Wright, born on 26 May 1867. One of only two siblings who were not professional artists. (Note: She married Bertie Neville Tennant (Note: Tennant was from the Sheffield family of brewers of that name.) (birth registered in the last quarter of 1869 (Note: While his birth was registered in the last quarter of 1869, his age is shown as two on the 1871 census. If he had been born in the last quarter of 1869 he could only have been 18 months old at the time of the census.) – probably in the first quarter of 1927 (Note: The reason for the lack of certainty is that while the age, first name, and initial match, no corroborating probate or newspaper records were found. It appears that Maud had remarried by 1939.)). The couple were married at St Martin-in-the-Fields, London, on 24 January 1891. In 1939 a Mabel Marston, a widow with the same date of birth as Mabel Wright, was living with the three sister's Louise, Ethel, and Constance, at the Best family home at 131 Woodham Lane, Richmond, Surrey. This suggests that Mabel had remarried and been widowed for a second time. In 1939 a Mabel Marston, a widow with the same date of birth as Mabel Wright, was living with the three sister's Louise, Ethel, and Constance, at the Best family home at 131 Woodham Lane, Richmond, Surrey. This suggests that Mabel had remarried and been widowed for a second time.)
- Ethel Wright, born 11 October 1870, was the second of the sibling who was not a professional artist. She was living with her sisteres at 131 Woodham lane in September 1939.
- Constance Wright (5 March 1877 – second quarter of 1973), described as a fashion artist in the 1911 census. (Note: She married insurance broker Cecil Arthur Best (22 September 1881 – 7 July 1959) on 28 October 1911, at St Augustine's, Honor Oak Park. The couple had at least one child, a boy, Anthony Allen Best (15 April 1913 – 24 March 1998), who also became an insurance broker.. Their life was interrupted by the first World War, but Best served at home throughout, winning the Meritorious Service Medal for his service. (Note: Best had already served five years in the reserve from 1903. He enlisted on 17 October 1914, was promoted to Corporal on 1 February 1915, promoted to acting Lance Sergeant on 15 July 1915, and to acting Quartermaster Sergeant on 13 August 1916. He demobilised on 18 March 1919. His initial posting was in the 24th (County of London) Battalion (The Queen's), but was immediately transferred to the 7th (City of London) Battalion, London Regiment and eventually, on 29 April 1916, to the Royal Defence Corps (where his regimental number was 3 - indicating that he was the third person to be enlisted in that Corps). He was usually placed on the Headquarters Staff of the units he served in.))
- Philip Wright, (c. 2 February 1878 (Note: Date of birth calculated from Army Records, as he gave his age as 37 years and 313 days when enlisting on 12 December 1915.) – 11 July 1926), (Note: His probate record gives his date of death as 11 July 1926, while his grave marker gives it as 12 July 1926.) described as a fashion artist in the 1901 and the 1911 census. (Note: Bradshaw said that he concentrated on Fashion after a good deal of experience as a general illustrator) (Note: He married Marion Broughton Barrett on 4 June 1910. The couple had a son, David, born on 12 December 1912 at home at 12 Gaynesford Road, Forest Hill. Philip enlisted on 12 December 1915, and was immediately assigned to the Army Reserve. He was mobilised on 4 December 1916 as a Gunner in the Royal Garrison Artillery. He saw service in Italy with 6 inch siege batteries No. 317 and No. 390, and was demobilised in March 1919. He is buried with his parents at Dulwich Old Cemetery in London.)
- Gilbert Scott Wright, (24 July 1880 – 1958), an artist who worked with his brother George in his early years and also painted sporting and coaching scenes. He served as executor for his brother Philip, and for his parents.

Wright seems never to have married. She was living at 131 Woodham Lane, Addlestone, Surrey at the time of the 1939 Register in the house of her sister and brother-in-law, together with her sisters Ethel and Mabel. It is not clear when she died. The most likely record in the UK Death Index is a Louise Wright whose death was registered in North Surrey in the first quarter of 1944, aged 79. Louise would have been aged 80 at the time, but errors in such dates are not exceptional, especially as Louise's notional year of birth from Census data was 1868.

== Work ==
Wright, like the rest of her family, had no formal training in art, and their abilities developed entirely on their professional needs. As a child, Wright spent most of her playtime designing dresses for her dolls. In 1891 the family was living at 6 Chestnut Ave, Headingley, in Leeds. However, there was little future there for the fashion illustrators in the family (Note: Louise, Constance, and Philip all worked on fashion illustration.) and the family moved to London. In 1901 the Family were living at 33 St. German's Road, Forest Hill, London. By 1911, Wright was living at Kirklees, 99 Honor Oak Park, with her parents, and her siblings Constance and Gilbert Scott.

Wright's first fashion work offered for sale was a series of watercolour designs for display in the windows of women's dress shops. This gained her an appointment as a designer for a costumier and soon after was offered commissions by Alfred Vivian Mansell & Co. (Note: A. Vivian Mansell and Co. were a publishers and printers, chiefly of postcards and posters, but who also produced calendars, and a series of colour prints by leading artists.) for whom she produced her first fashion catalogue. Soon she was so busy that her brother Gilbert Scott Wright had to come to her assistance, and soon the whole family was engaged in fashion drawing.

Wright spent a year as the chief staff artist for Queen for a year.

=== Example of her work ===
The following illustrations are from The Art of the Illustrator. The first stage drawing is very faint as it was done in soft pencil and the ink may have faded over time.

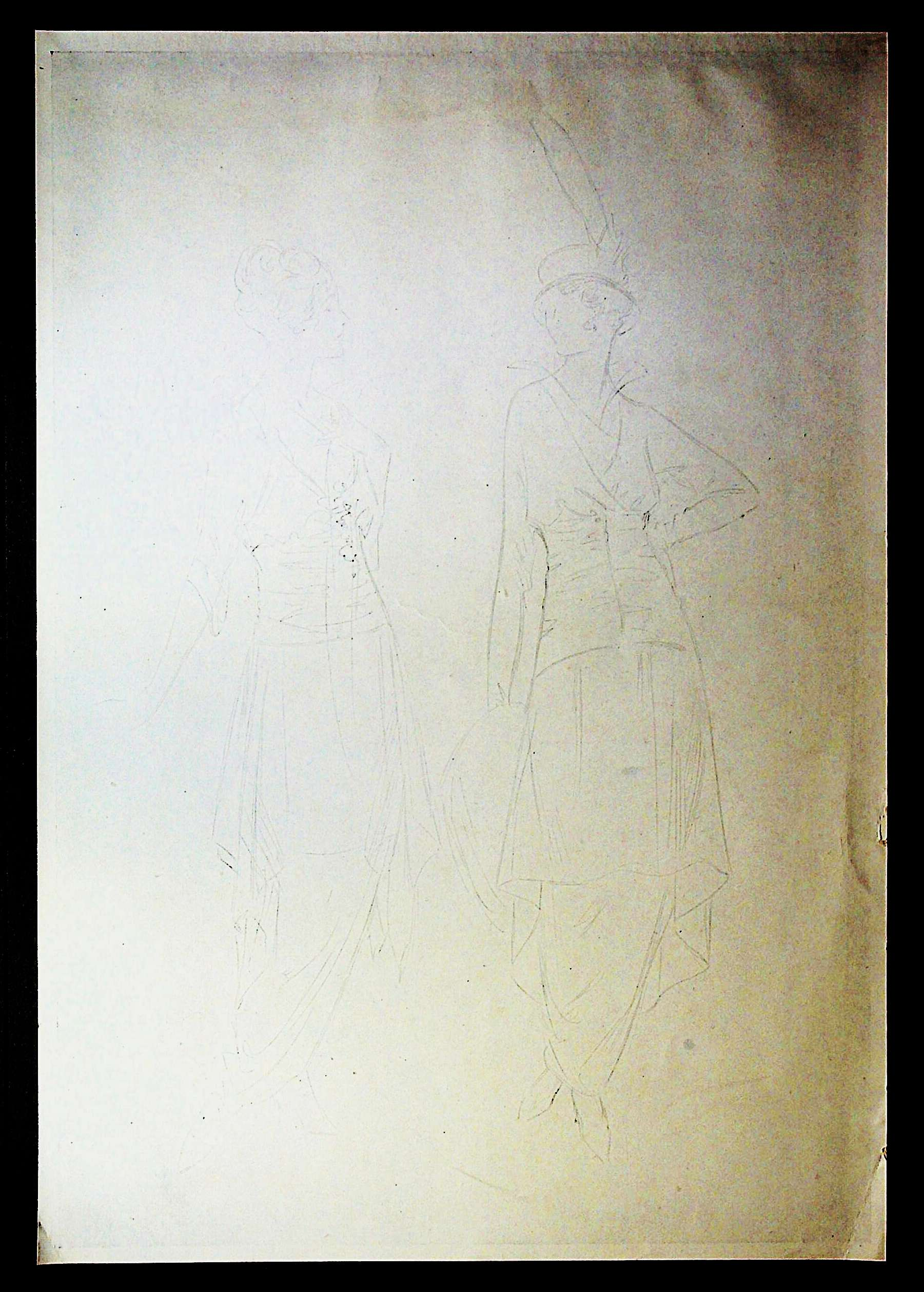
First stage

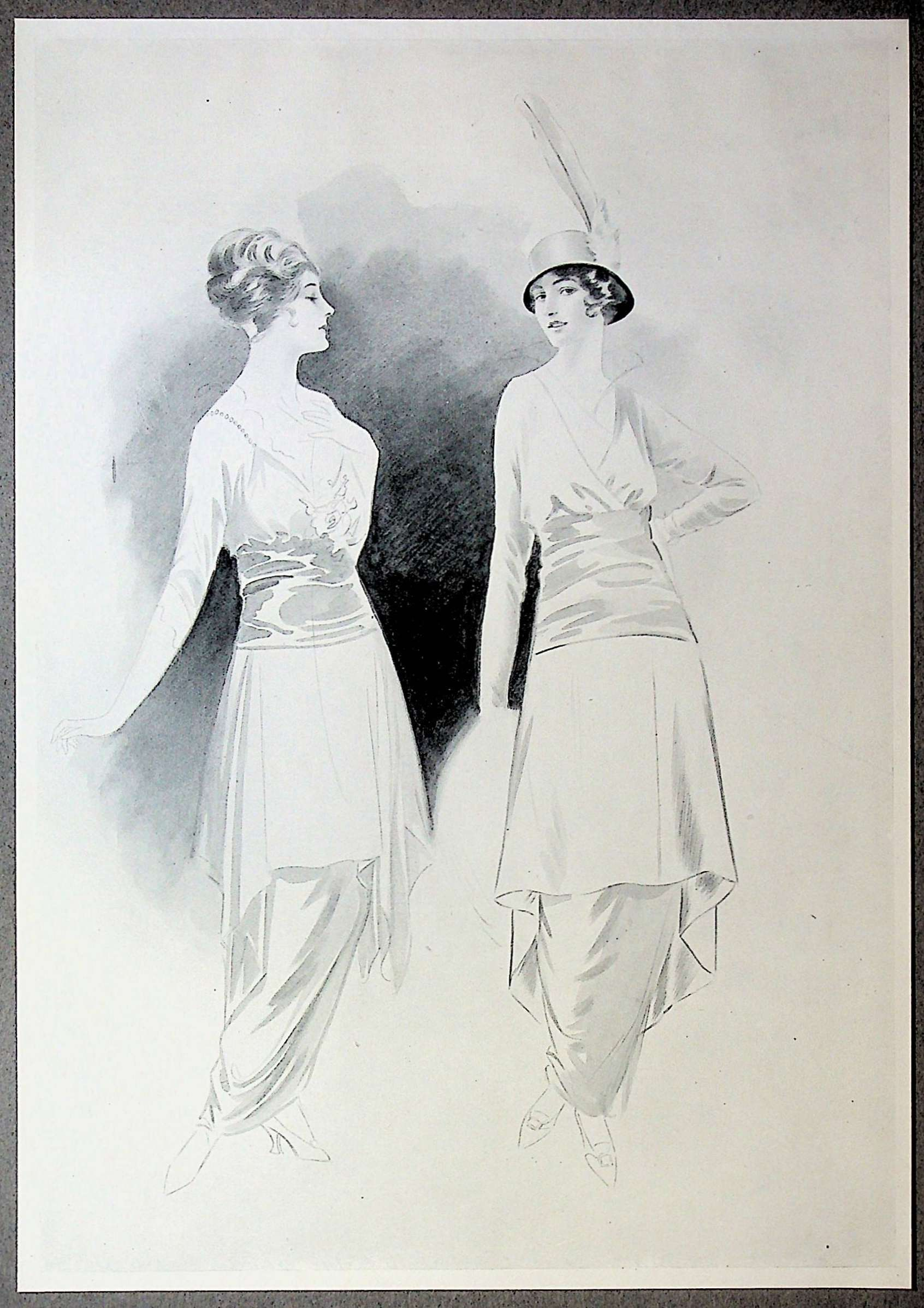
Second stage

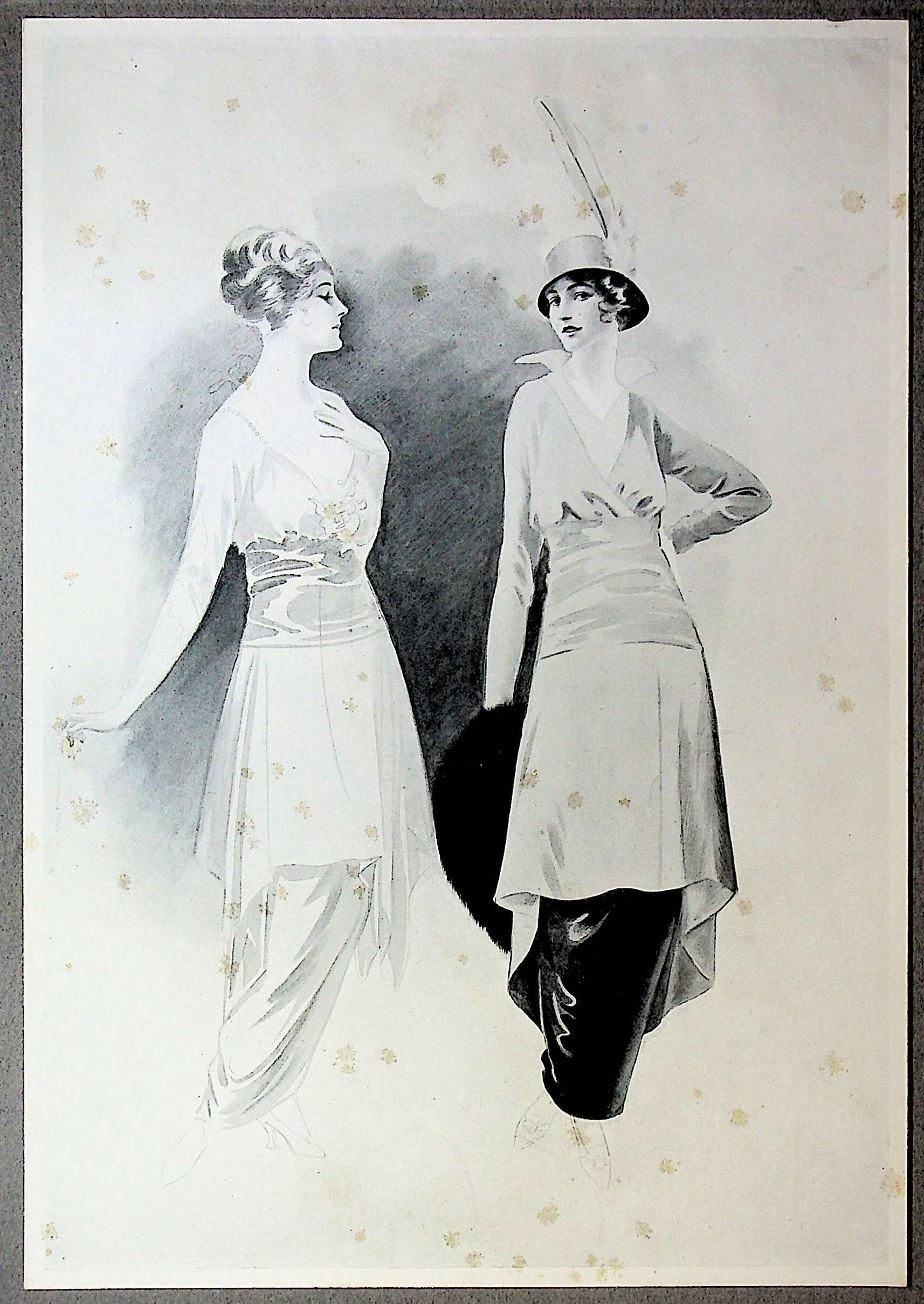
Third stage

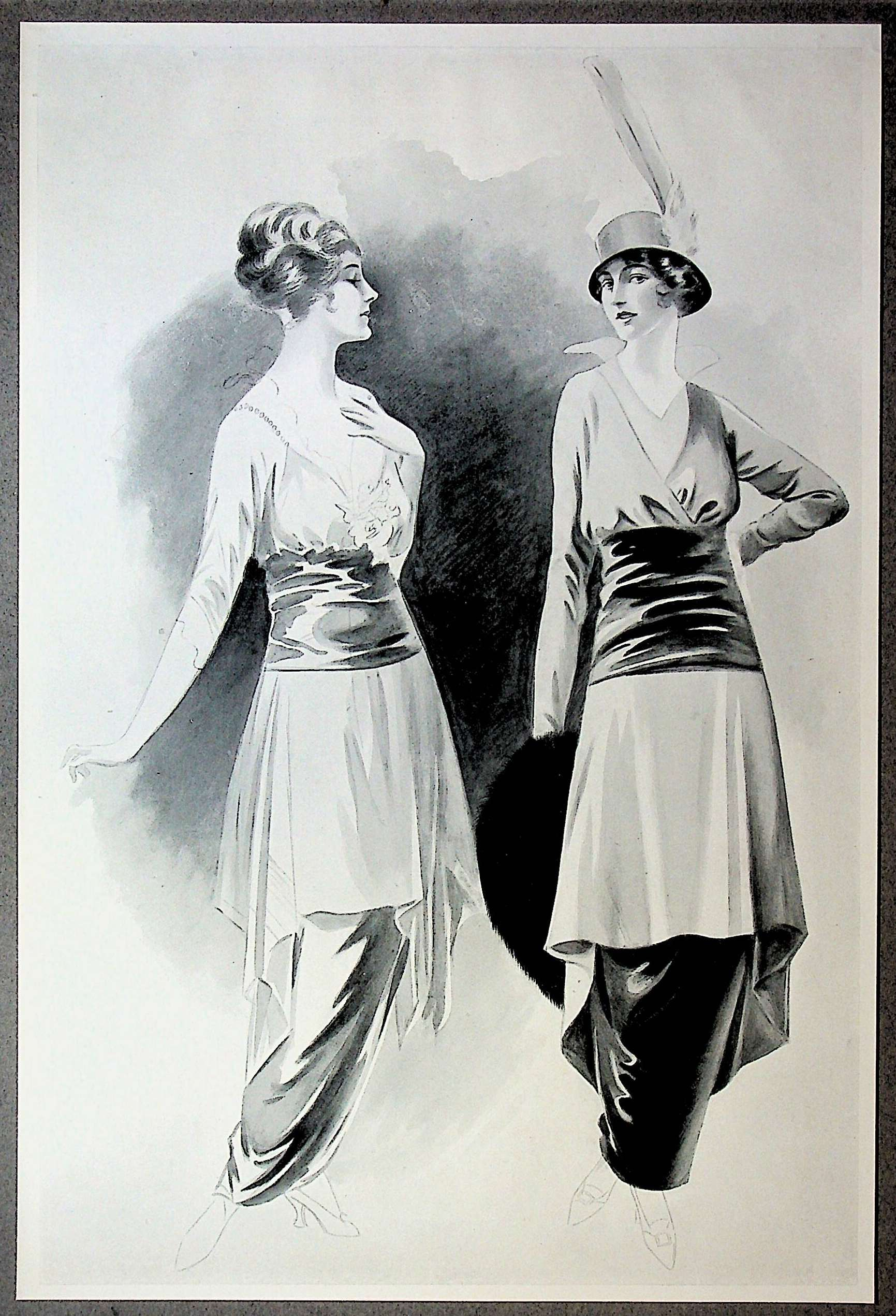
Fourth stage

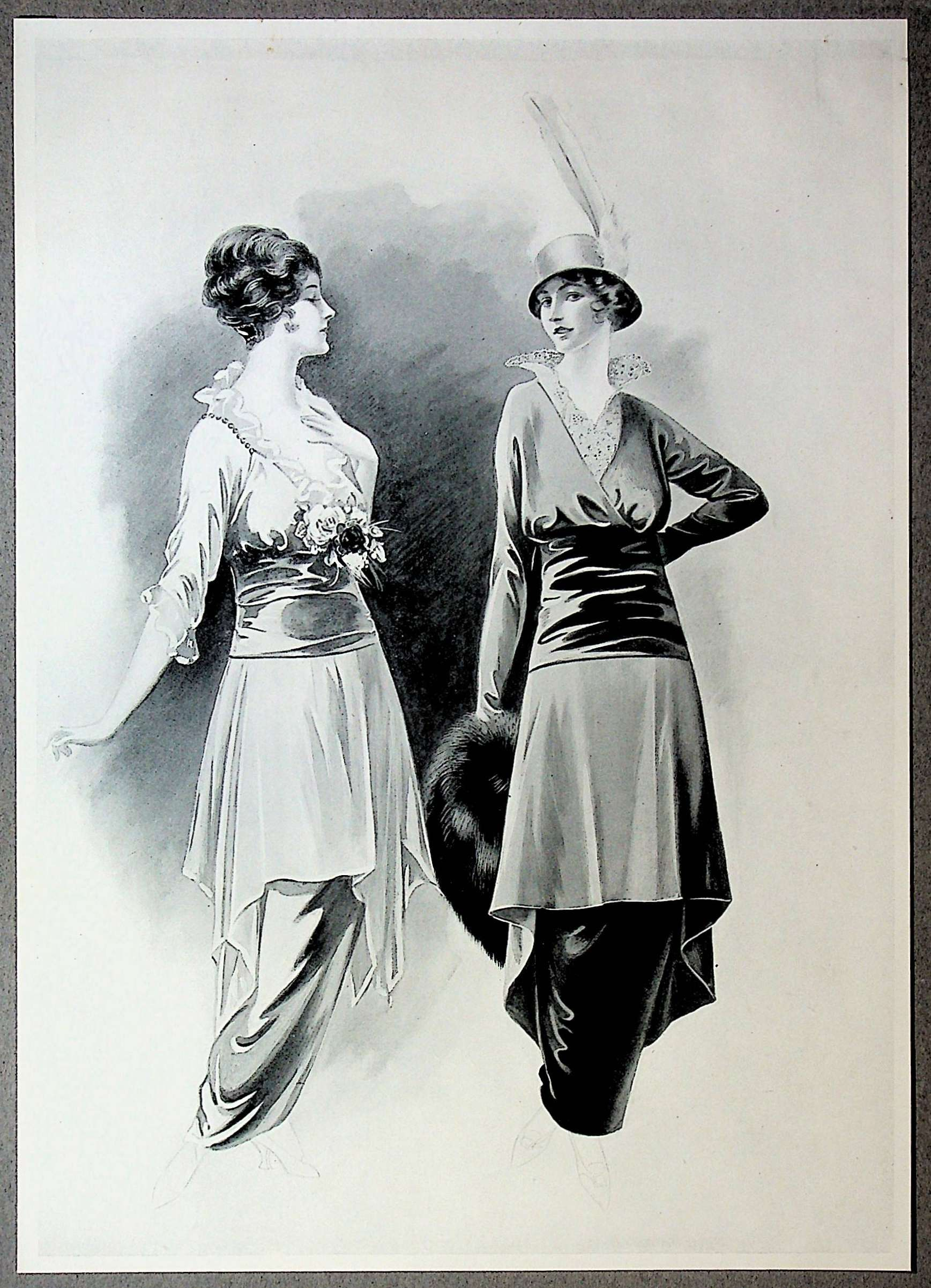
Fifth stage

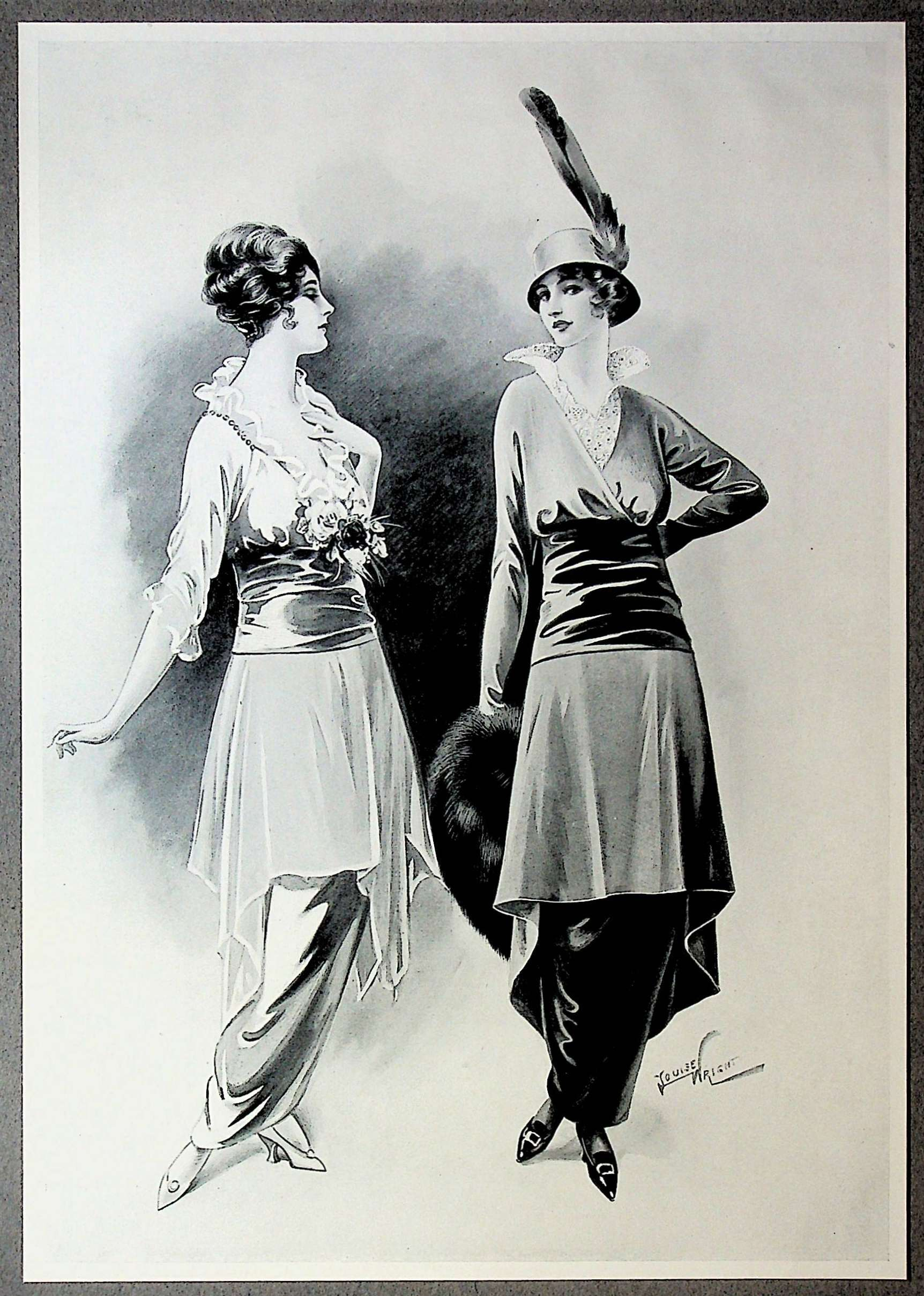
Final illustration

== Assessment ==
Wright was one of the leading illustrators selected by Percy Bradshaw for inclusion in his The Art of the Illustrator which presented a separate portfolio for each of twenty illustrators. The portfolio contained: a brief biography of Wright, an illustration of Wright at work in her studio, a sample of Wright's signature, an explanation of Wright's method of working-up the attached plates. The final plate showing an illustration typical of her work and five other plates showed the work at five earlier stages of its production, from the first rough to the just before the finished drawing or colour sketch. Wright's illustration is shown in the example above.

Bradshaw said that Louise and her siblings Wrights started the vogue for the beautifully illustrated Fashion Catalogues which have been issued by drapers, costumiers, tailors, etc., in recent years, and that this work kept the family perpetually busy. He further said that Wright had been responsible for a great deal of the best Fashion work which has been produced in this country and that her work was known and appreciated by users of Fashion drawing everywhere.
