= Wright Mountain (Texas) =

Mountain in Texas, United States

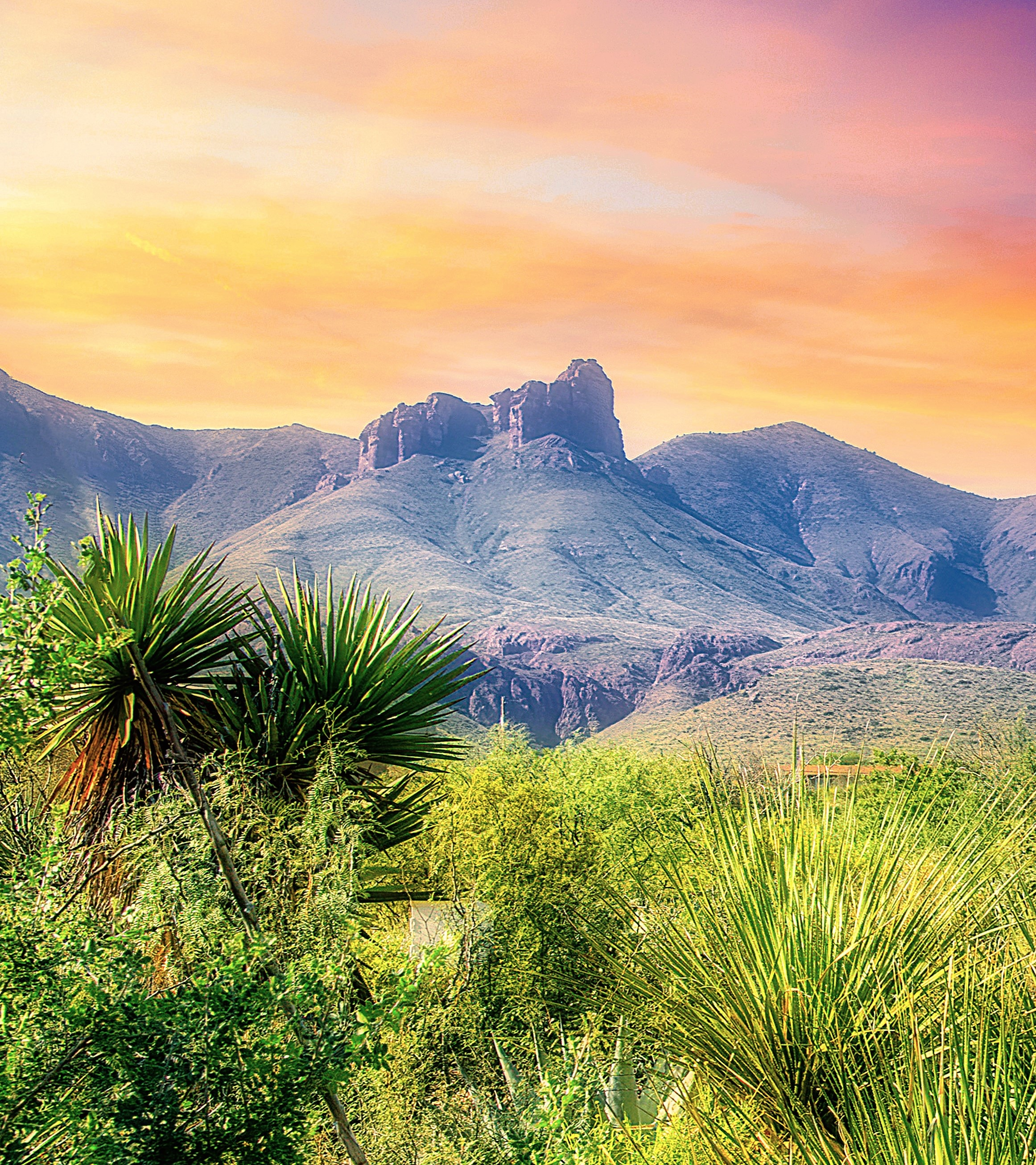
- North aspect

Highest point
- Elevation: 6,031 ft (1,838 m)
- Prominence: 209 ft (64 m)
- Parent peak: Panther Peak (6,418 ft)
- Isolation: 0.63 mi (1.01 km)
- Coordinates: 29°17′44″N 103°13′33″W

Naming
- Etymology: George Melendez Wright

Geography
- Location within Texas Location within the United States
- Country: United States
- State: Texas
- County: Brewster
- Protected area: Big Bend National Park
- Parent range: Chisos Mountains
- Topo map: USGS Panther Junction

Geology
- Rock age: Oligocene
- Rock type: Extrusive igneous rock

Climbing
- Easiest route: class 5.x

Wright Mountain is a 6,031-foot-elevation (1,838-meter) summit in Brewster County, Texas, United States.

== Description ==
Wright Mountain is set within Big Bend National Park, the Chihuahuan Desert, and the Chisos Mountains. The mountain is composed of volcanic rock which formed during the Oligocene period. Although modest in elevation, topographic relief is significant as the summit rises 1,800 feet (549 m) above the surrounding terrain in one mile (1.6 km). Based on the Köppen climate classification, Wright Mountain is located in a hot arid climate zone with hot summers and mild winters. Any scant precipitation runoff from the mountain's slopes drains northeast to Tornillo Creek which is a tributary of the Rio Grande. The lower slopes of the peak are covered by juniper, oak, and piñon. The mountain's toponym was officially adopted in 1948 by the United States Board on Geographic Names to honor George Melendez Wright (1904–1936), an American biologist who conceived of, then conducted, the first scientific survey of fauna for the National Park Service between 1929 and 1933. He advanced quickly with the National Park Service, in 1933 becoming the first leader of the agency's new Wildlife Division. In 1936, Wright was part of an international commission to investigate the potential values of a protected area to straddle the Rio Grande area of Texas and Mexico. The report was enthusiastic and the commission endorsed the national park idea. Tragically, George Wright and Roger Toll were killed in a car accident on their return from Texas. Toll and Wright Mountains were named in their memory.

== See also ==
- List of mountain peaks of Texas
- Geography of Texas

== Gallery ==
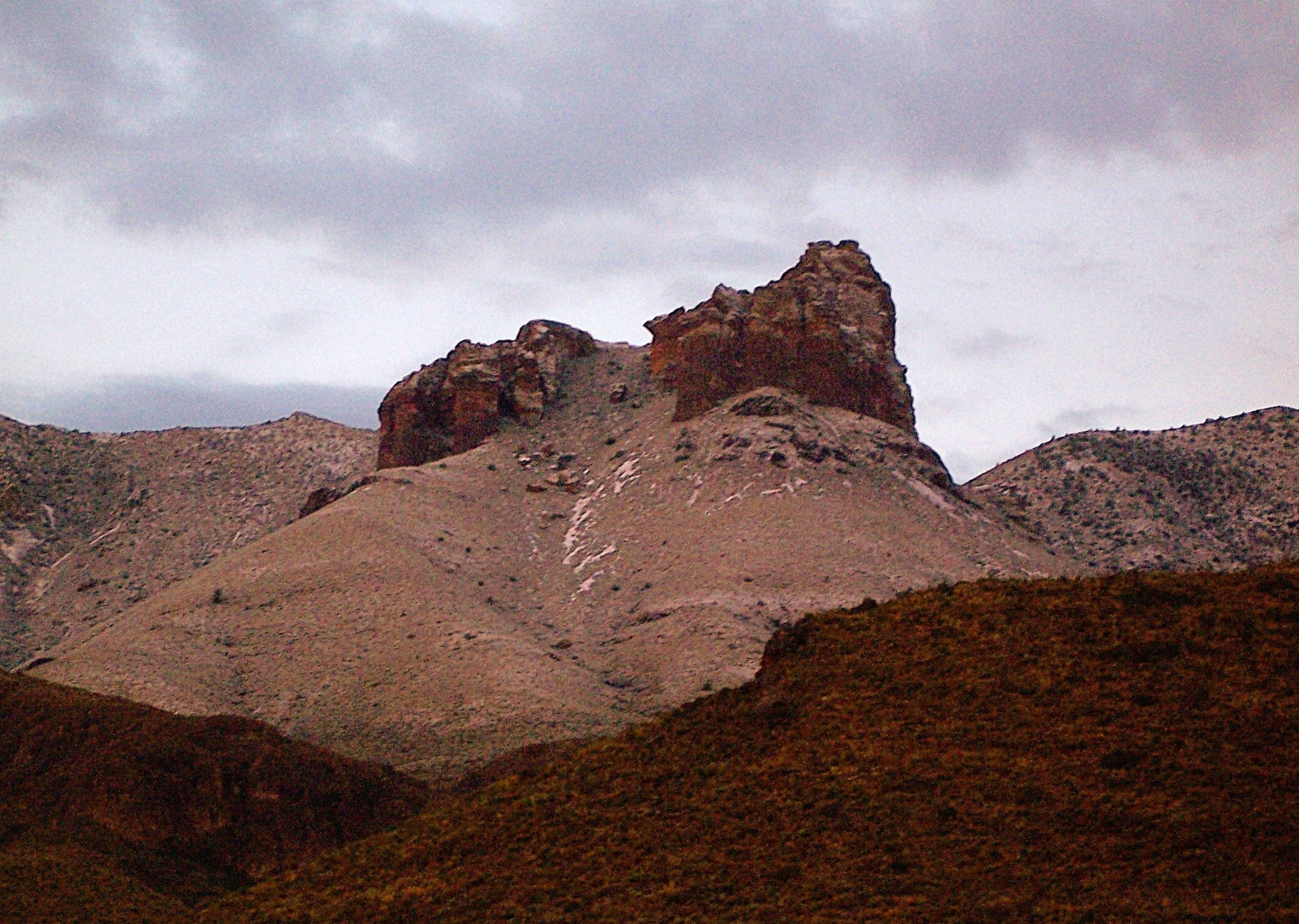
Northeast aspect

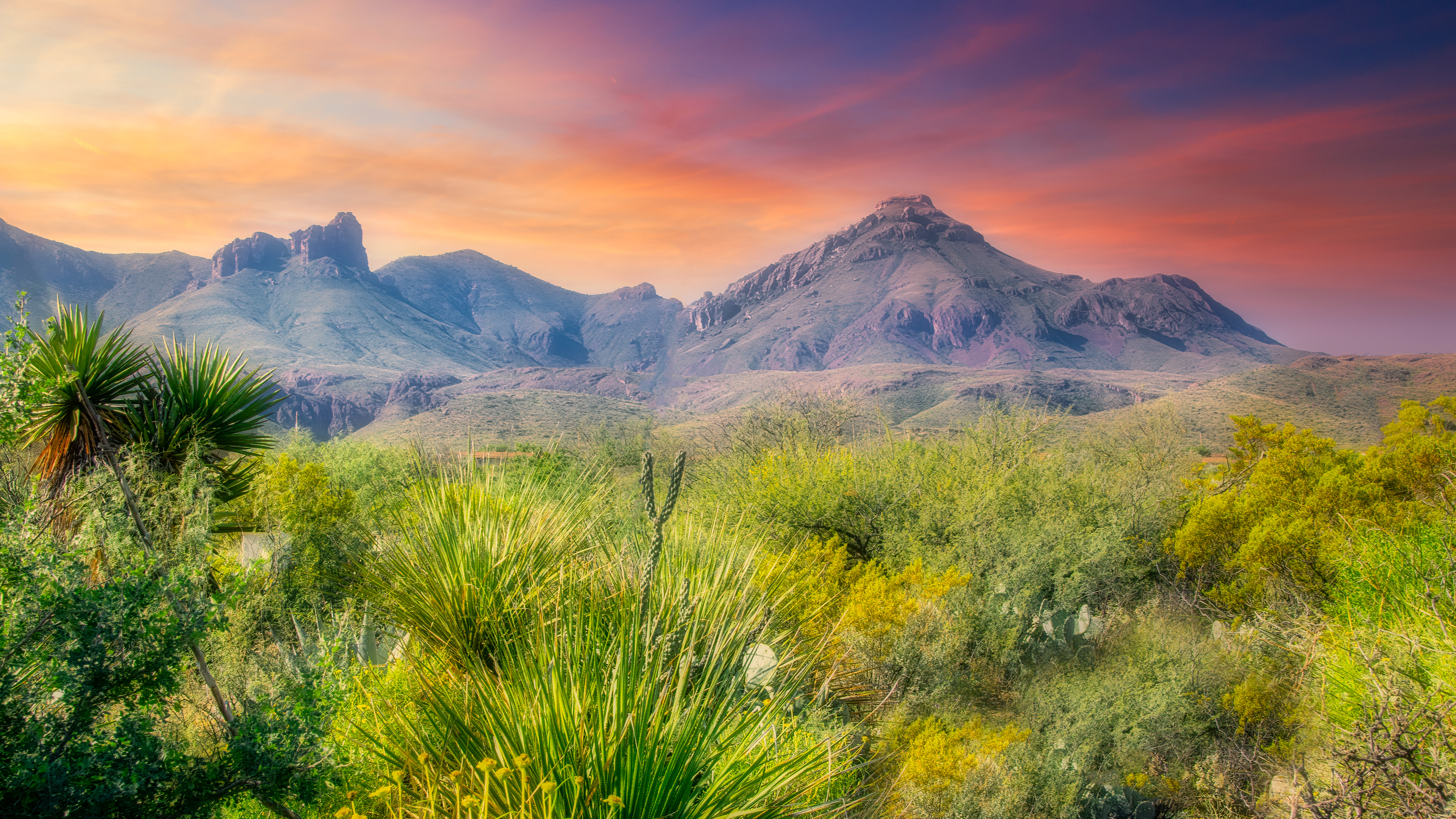
Wright Mountain (left), Panther Peak (right)

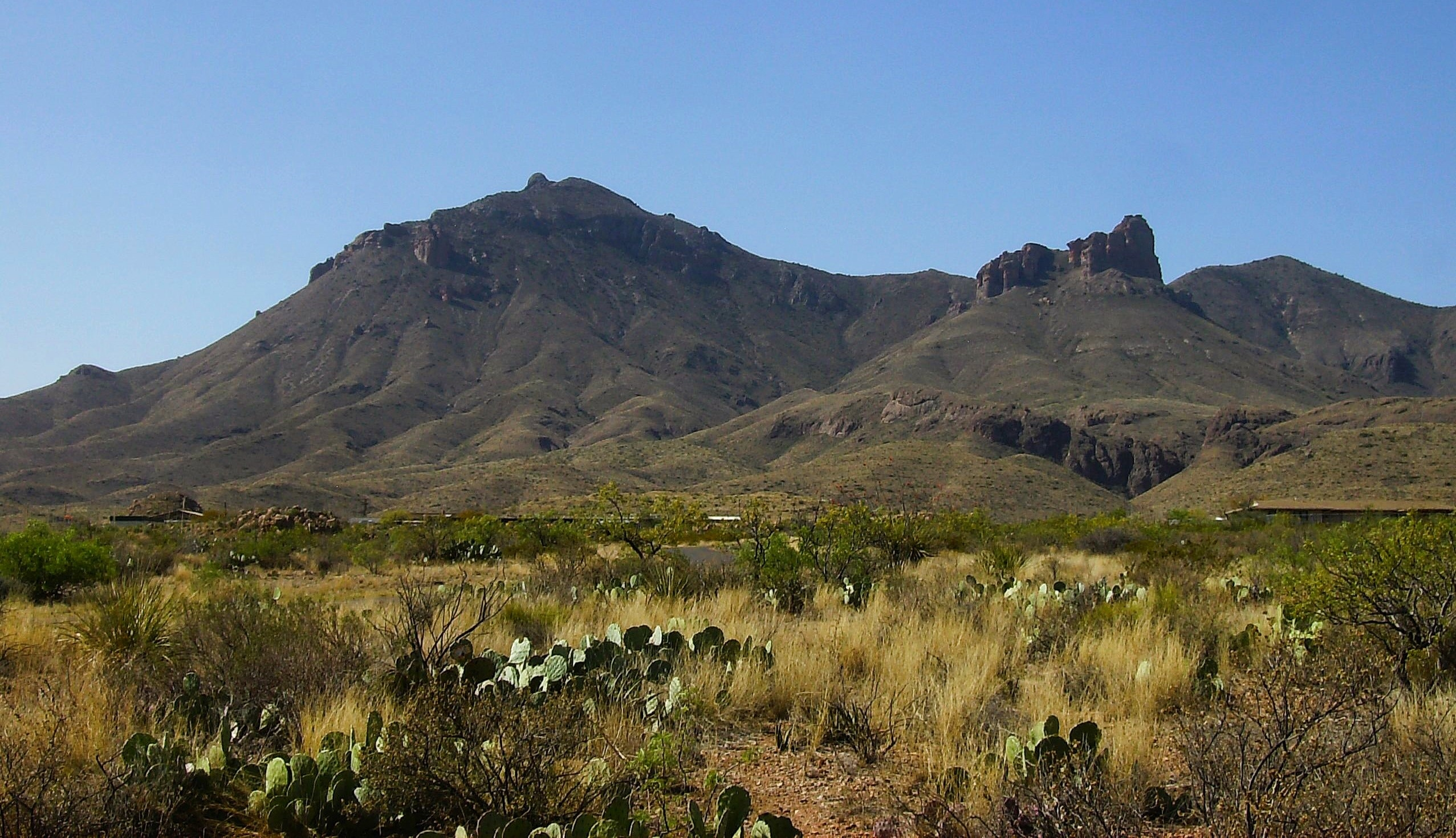
Pummel Peak (left) and Wright Mountain

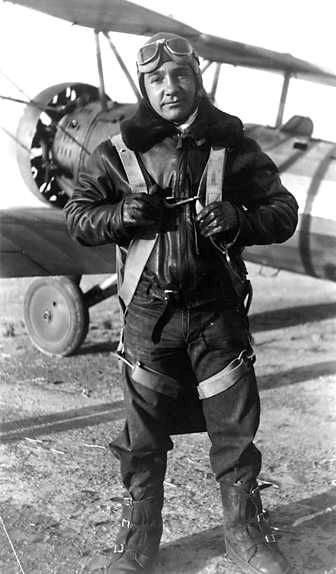
George Wright in airplane costume photographed by his friend Roger Toll in 1936. On February 25, 1936, both Toll and Wright were killed in an automobile accident near Deming, New Mexico. International Park Commission, Big Bend, Texas.
