= Panther Peak (Texas) =

Mountain in Texas, United States

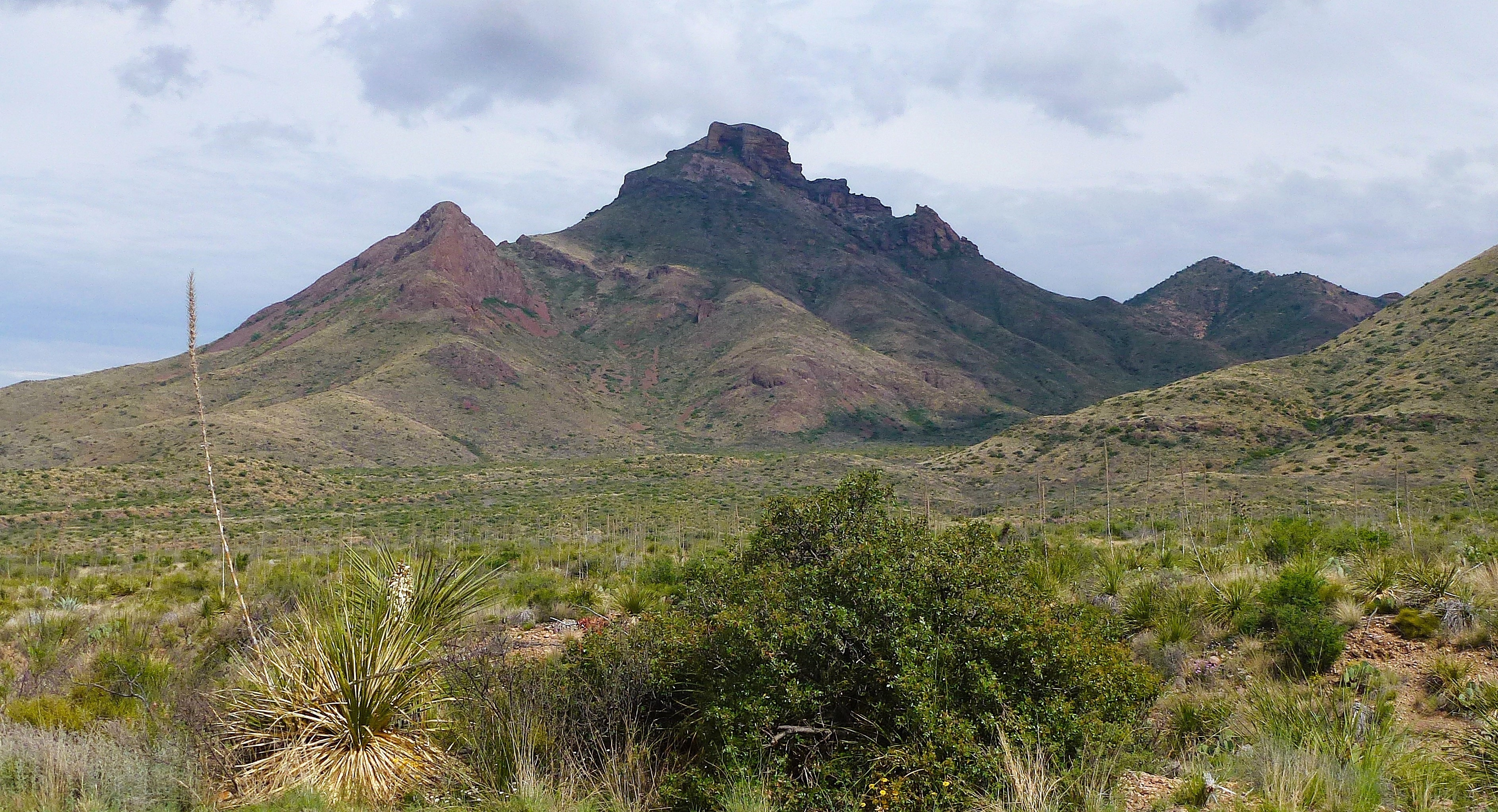
- West aspect

Highest point
- Elevation: 6,418 ft (1,956 m)
- Prominence: 733 ft (223 m)
- Parent peak: Pummel Peak (6,639 ft)
- Isolation: 1.49 mi (2.40 km)
- Coordinates: 29°17′53″N 103°14′21″W

Geography
- Location within Texas Location within the United States
- Country: United States
- State: Texas
- County: Brewster
- Protected area: Big Bend National Park
- Parent range: Chisos Mountains
- Topo map: USGS Panther Junction

Geology
- Rock age: Oligocene
- Rock type: Volcanic rock (rhyolite)

Climbing
- Easiest route: class 2+

Panther Peak is a 6,418-foot-elevation (1,956-meter) summit in Brewster County, Texas, United States.

== Description ==
Panther Peak is set within Big Bend National Park, the Chihuahuan Desert, and the Chisos Mountains. The mountain is composed of rhyolite (volcanic rock) which formed during the Oligocene period. Although modest in elevation, topographic relief is significant as the summit rises 2,000 feet (610 m) above the surrounding terrain in one mile (1.6 km). Based on the Köppen climate classification, Panther Peak is located in a hot arid climate zone with hot summers and mild winters. Any scant precipitation runoff from the mountain's slopes drains northeast to Tornillo Creek which is a tributary of the Rio Grande. The lower slopes of the peak are covered by juniper, oak, and piñon. The mountain's toponym was officially adopted on March 9, 1939, by the United States Board on Geographic Names. The peak was so named in association with Panther Spring on the northeast slope.

== See also ==
- List of mountain peaks of Texas
- Geography of Texas

== Gallery ==
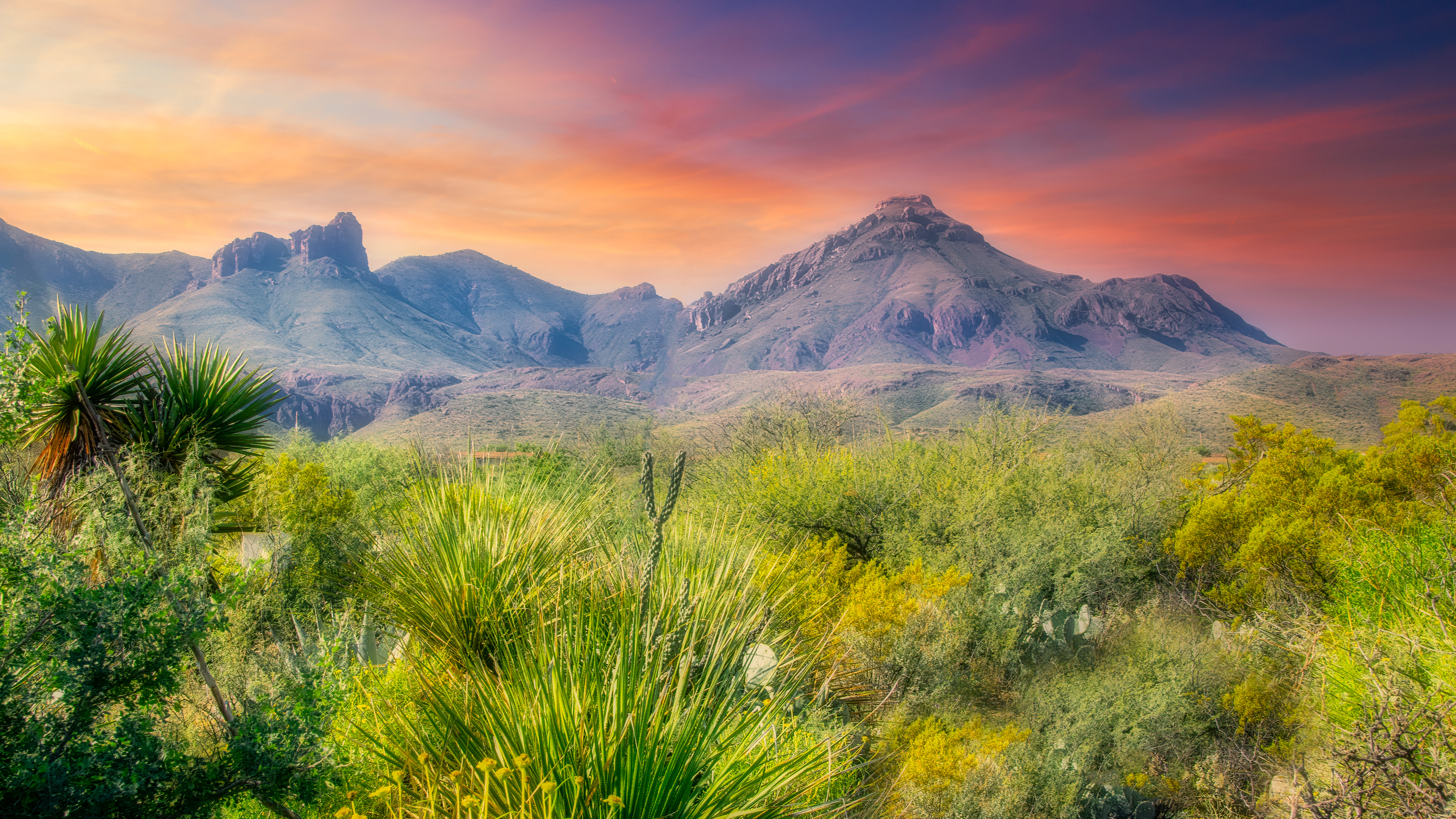
Panther Peak (right), with Wright Mountain (left)

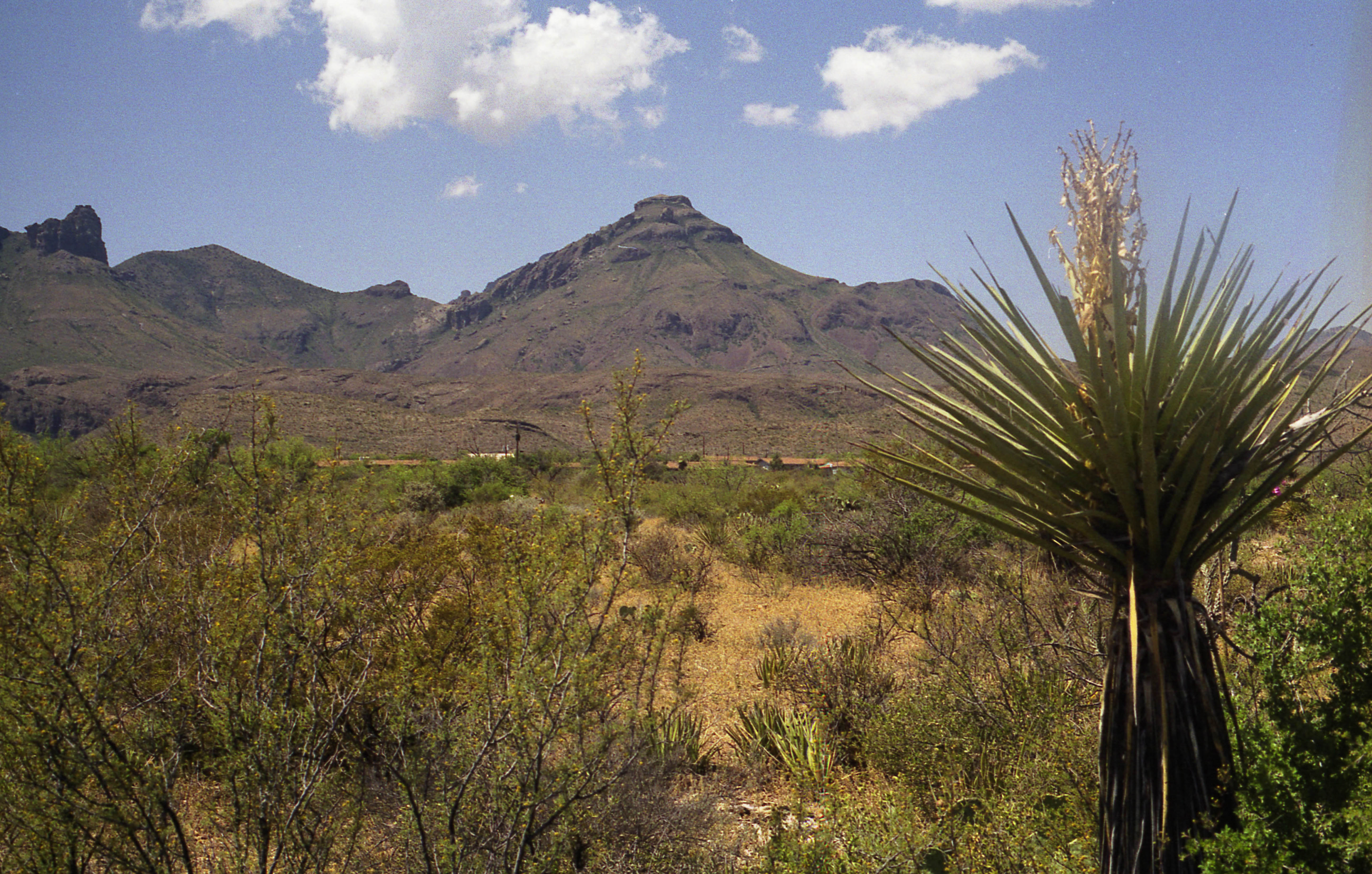
Northeast aspect

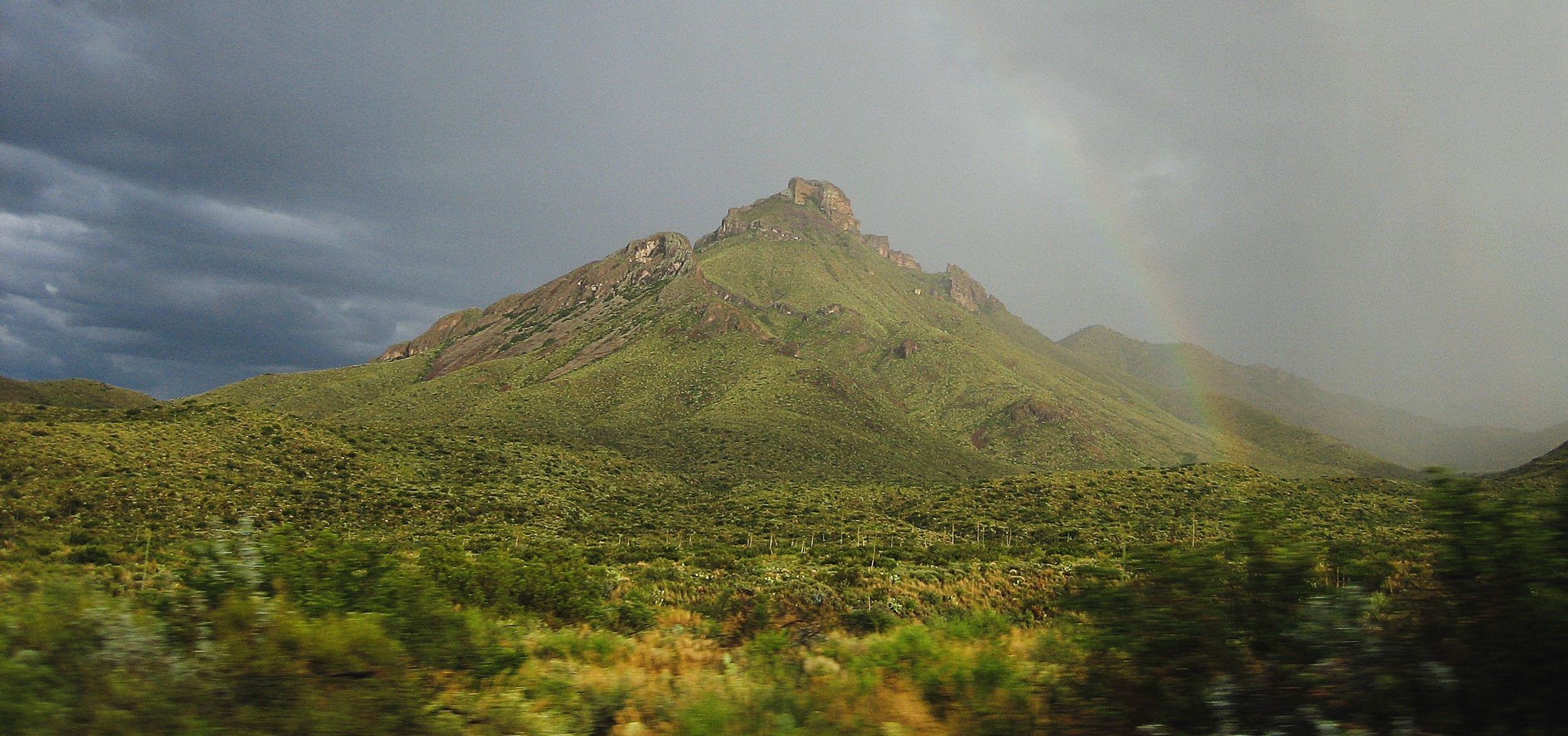
West aspect
