= Gilbert Scott Wright =

English painter (1880–1958)

- Born: 24 July 1880; Leeds, Yorkshire, England
- Died: c. 1958 (age c. 78)
- Other name: Gilbert S. Wright
- Occupations: Painter and Illustrator
- Years active: 1892–1935 (Note: He sold an oil painting to a print maker at the age of 12.)
- Known for: Painting hunting and coaching scenes

Gilbert Scott Wright (24 July 1880 – 1958) was an English painter. Like his older brother George Wright, he painted hunting and coaching scenes, as well as horse portraits. Wright was one of a family of seven children, five of whom were professional artists, either principally as painters, or as illustrators.

== Biography ==
Wright was born in Leeds on 24 July 1880, and baptised on 29 June 1881. His father was George Edward Wright (24 February 1834 – 11 November 1916), an accountant and Elizabeth Scott (c. 1840 – 31 May 1916), the daughter or Thomas Scott (born c. 1804), variously a railway engineer and a commission agent. George Edward and Elizabeth were married on 22 August 1859 in St' Jude's Church at Hunslet, Leeds, Yorkshire, England.

George Edward Wright and Elizabeth Scott had seven children, five of whom were professional artists, but none of whom has any formal training in art:

- George Wright, (30 June 1860 – 11 March 1944) the eldest and a noted painter of hunting and coaching scenes. (Note: George married Rose Ellen Tribe (14 December 1864 – 13 November 1943) (Note: She gives her date of birth in the 1939 Register as 14 December 1864. However, her baptismal records show that she was baptised on 27 April 1864, and born on 14 December 1863.) of Leeds, the daughter of Edward Tribe, (born c.1817) a publican and Kezia Tribe (born c. 1925), on 30 March 1885 at the parish church of Wrangthorn, Yorkshire. The couple had two daughters: Florence Bensley Wright, born 16 December 1886.; Enid Wright, baptised 1 June 1888.)
- Louise Wright, born 5 September 1863, a fashion illustrator. (Note: Louise Wright was one of the leading illustrators selected by Percy Bradshaw for inclusion in his The Art of the Illustrator which presented a separate portfolio for each of twenty illustrators. The portfolio contained: a brief biography of Wright, an illustration of Wright at work in her studio, a sample of Wright's signature, an explanation of Wright's method of working-up the attached plates. The final plate showing an illustration typical of her work and five other plates showed the work at five earlier stages of its production, from the first rough to the just before the finished drawing or colour sketch. Wright's black and white illustration shows two fashion models as the detail of the clothing is built up.)
- Mabel Wright, born on 26 May 1867. One of only two siblings who were not professional artists. (Note: She married Bertie Neville Tennant (Note: Tennant was from the Sheffield family of brewers of that name.) (birth registered in the last quarter of 1869 (Note: While his birth was registered in the last quarter of 1869, his age is shown as two on the 1871 census. If he had been born in the last quareter of 1869 he could only have been 18 months old at the time of the census.) – perhaps the first quarter of 1927 (Note: The reason for the lack of certainty is that while the age, first name, and initial match, no corroborating probate or newspaper records were found. It appears that Maud had remarried before 1939.)) at St Martin-in-the-Fields, London, on 24 January 1891. In 1939 a Mabel Marston, a widow with the same date of birth as Mabel Wright, was living with the three sister's Louise, Ethel, and Constance, at the Best family home at 131 Woodham Lane, Richmond, Surrey. This suggests that Mabel had remarried and been widowed for a second time.)
- Ethel Wright, born 11 October 1870, was the second of the sibling who was not a professional artist. She was living with her sisteres at 131 Woodham lane in September 1939.
- Constance Wright (5 March 1877 – second quarter of 1973), described as a fashion artist in the 1911 census. (Note: She married insurance broker Cecil Arthur Best (22 September 1881 – 7 July 1959) on 28 October 1911, at St Augustine's, Honor Oak Park. The couple had at least one child, a boy, Anthony Allen Best (15 April 1913 – 24 March 1998), who also became an insurance broker.. Their life was interrupted by the first World War, but Best served at home throughout, winning the Meritorious Service Medal for his service. (Note: Best had already served five years in the reserve from 1903. He enlisted on 17 October 1914, was promoted to Corporal on 1 February 1915, promoted to acting Lance Sergeant on 15 July 1915, and to acting Quartermaster Sergeant on 13 August 1916. He demobilised on 18 March 1919. His initial posting was in the 24th (County of London) Battalion (The Queen's), but was immediately transferred to the 7th (City of London) Battalion, London Regiment and eventually, on 29 April 1916, to the Royal Defence Corps (where his regimental number was 3 - indicating that he was the third person to be enlisted in that Corps). He was usually placed on the Headquarters Staff of the units he served in.))
- Philip Wright, (c. 2 February 1878 (Note: Date of birth calculated from Army Records, as he gave his age as 37 years and 313 days when enlisting on 12 December 1915.) – 11 July 1926), (Note: His probate record gives his date of death as 11 July 1926, while his grave marker gives it as 12 July 1926.) described as a fashion artist in the 1901 and the 1911 census. (Note: Bradshaw said that he concentrated on Fashion after a good deal of experience as a general illustrator) (Note: He married Marion Broughton Barrett on 4 June 1910. The couple had a son, David, born on 12 December 1912 at home at 12 Gaynesford Road, Forest Hill. Philip enlisted on 12 December 1915, and was immediately assigned to the Army Reserve. He was mobilised on 4 December 1916 as a Gunner in the Royal Garrison Artillery. He saw service in Italy with 6 inch siege batteries No. 317 and No. 390, and was demobilised in March 1919. He is buried with his parents at Dulwich Old Cemetery in London.)
- Gilbert Scott Wright, the youngest, and the subject of this article.

Wright married Margaret Ellen Graeme Sharpe (28 February 1880 – 12 December 1957) at Christ Church in Forest Hill on 1 June 1912. He married from his parents' home at Kirklees, Honor Oak Park, in Forest Hill. Margaret had been born in Costa Rica to Philip Sharpe (c. 1849 – 12 December 1905) and Alianora Rufford (baptised 25 June 1848 – 1892). (Note: Cecil Sharpe was British Acting Consul at San Jose, Costa Rica, during three short periods in 1880 and 1881. On 4 June 1881 he was appointed Consul and held the post until he resigned in June 1894.)

Wright and Margaret had at least one child, a daughter, Shiela Scott Wright (15 March 1919 – 16 December 1993) who was an art student, living with her mother in 1939.

Margaret petitioned for divorce in 1937. Her petition was granted as the 1939 Register showed her marital status as divorced. Margaret died on 12 December 1957. She was living at 22 Grena Road, Richmond, Surrey at the time but dies at 26 Wolverton Avenue, Kingston upon Thames. Her estate was valued at £3,265 18s. 5d. Her daughter was her executrix. Wright served as executor for his brother Philip, and for his parents.

Most sources given 1958 as the year of death for Wright.. However, the only entry for a Gilbert S. Wright of the right age in the UK Death Index suggests that Wright died in the fourth quarter of 1959.

== Work ==
Like the rest of his family, Wright had no formal training in art. He probably learned to paint from his brother George Wright who was twenty years his senior, (Note: Bradshaw reports that by age 12, Gilbert was producing saleable paintings in oils.) in producing paintings of sporting and coaching scenes for calendars and other work. They collaborated until about 1925.

In his early teens Wright fell under the influence of Samuel Edmund Waller, and at the age of 13 began to produce paintings of handsome Georgian gallants, many on horseback, either courting or eloping with their lady loves. In 1900 he exhibited How he won the VC7 (Note: The painting depicted a famous incident at the battle of Geluk during the Second Anglo-Boer War. Major Edward Douglas Brown won the Victoria Cross for used his horse to carry first a wounded trumpeter, Henry James Deccan Leigh, and then another man out of action under heavy fire.) at the Royal Academy. The painting was soon purchased by a print publisher, and this led to many commissions.

Wright produced illustrations for a number of publications including a two-page spread of a Lion in the Path for The Graphic in 1910, a two-page colour hunting illustration for the Illustrated London News in 1913, a colour illustration for The Bystander in 1930. He also produced prints for sale.

Wright produced postcards for James Henderson, for whom Wright painted horses heads, M. Munk, (Note: M. Munk was a Vienese printer and publisher who exported to Britain and published the works of British artists.) and Tuck, for whom Wright painted a whole series of sets of cards including:

- A Hunting Morning
- A Hunting we will go
- British Sports
- Christmas coaching
- Christmas old style with Dickens quotes
- Christmas rural insets
- Coaching: Series I
- Coaching: Series II
- Fox Hunting
- Hunting

Wright also did some book illustration, normally in full colour. He illustrated the Children's Dickens with eight colour full-page plates. Wright was a regular contributor to the Christmas post cards for the Royal Family. He painted the card for the Prince of Wales in both 1928 and 1931, and for the Duke and Duchess of York in both 1930 and 1935.

=== Example of book illustration by Wright ===
In 1909, Wright provide eight full page illustrations for The Children's Dickens: Stories selected from various tale (1909) London: Henry Frowde and Hodder and Stoughton. There was also a colour illustration pasted to the front boards. Abe Books shows two different versions of this illustration, and it may be that Wright produced these as well as the eight full page illustration in the book.

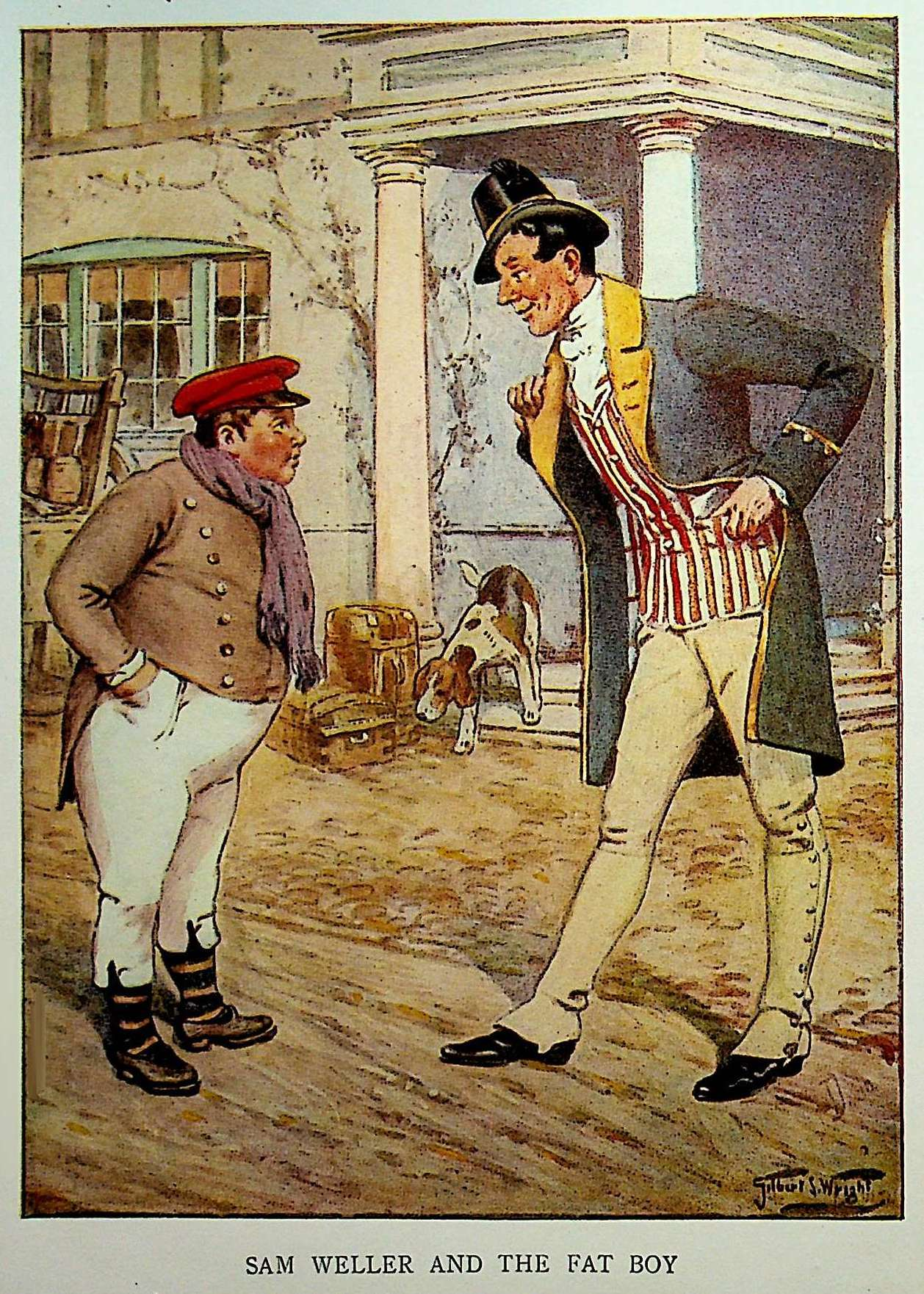
Sam Weller and the Fat Boy

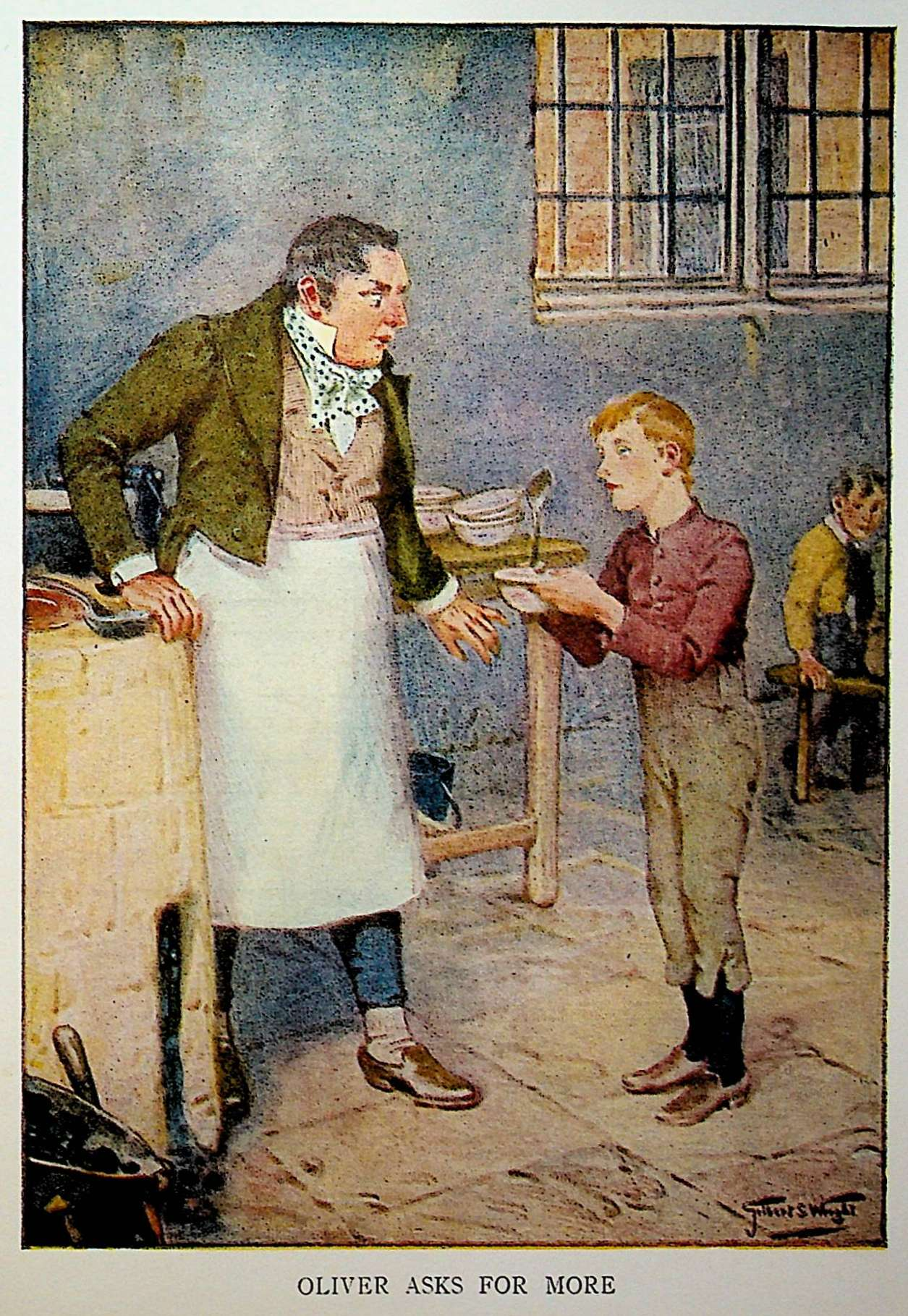
Oliver asks for more

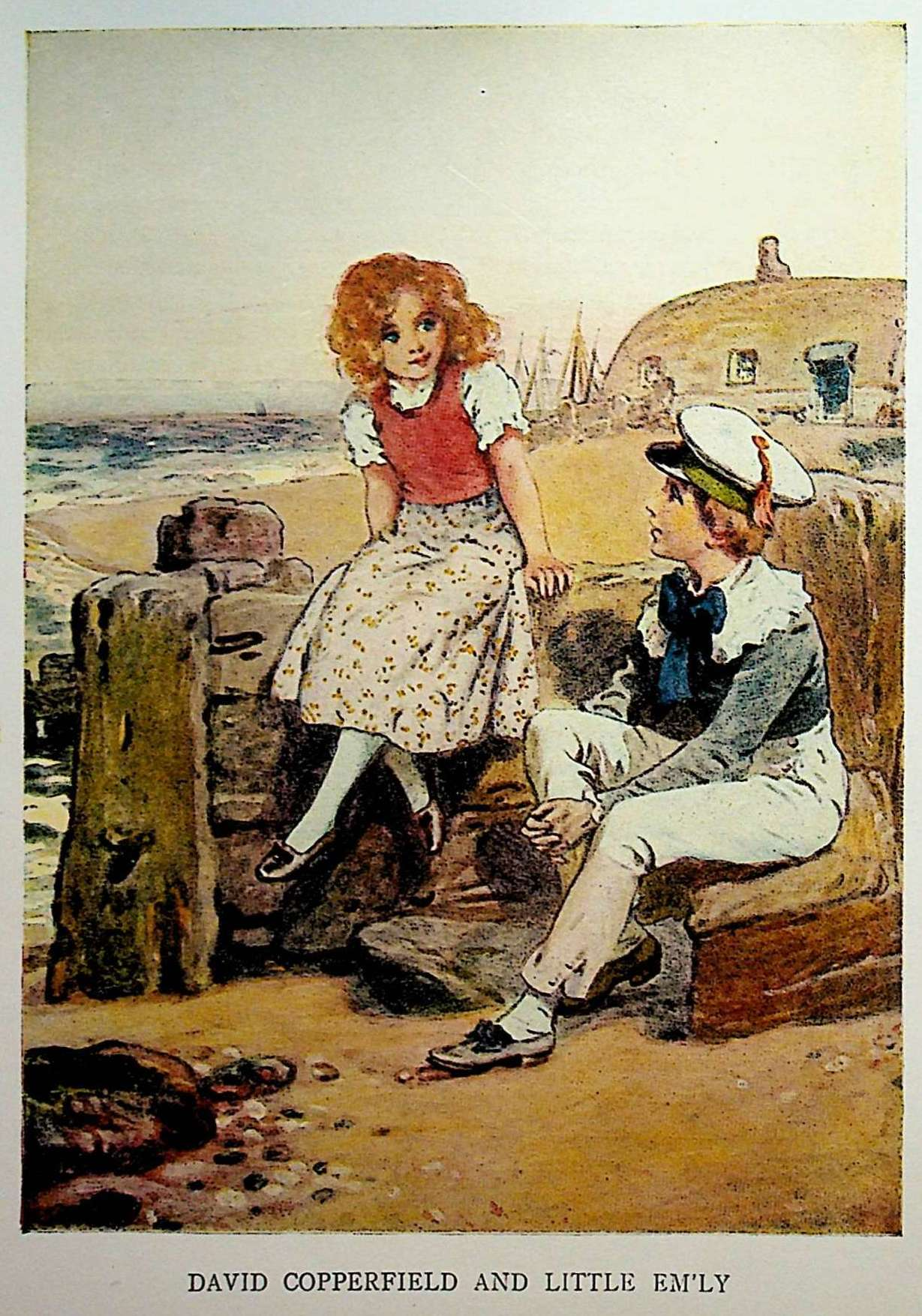
David Copperfield and little Emily

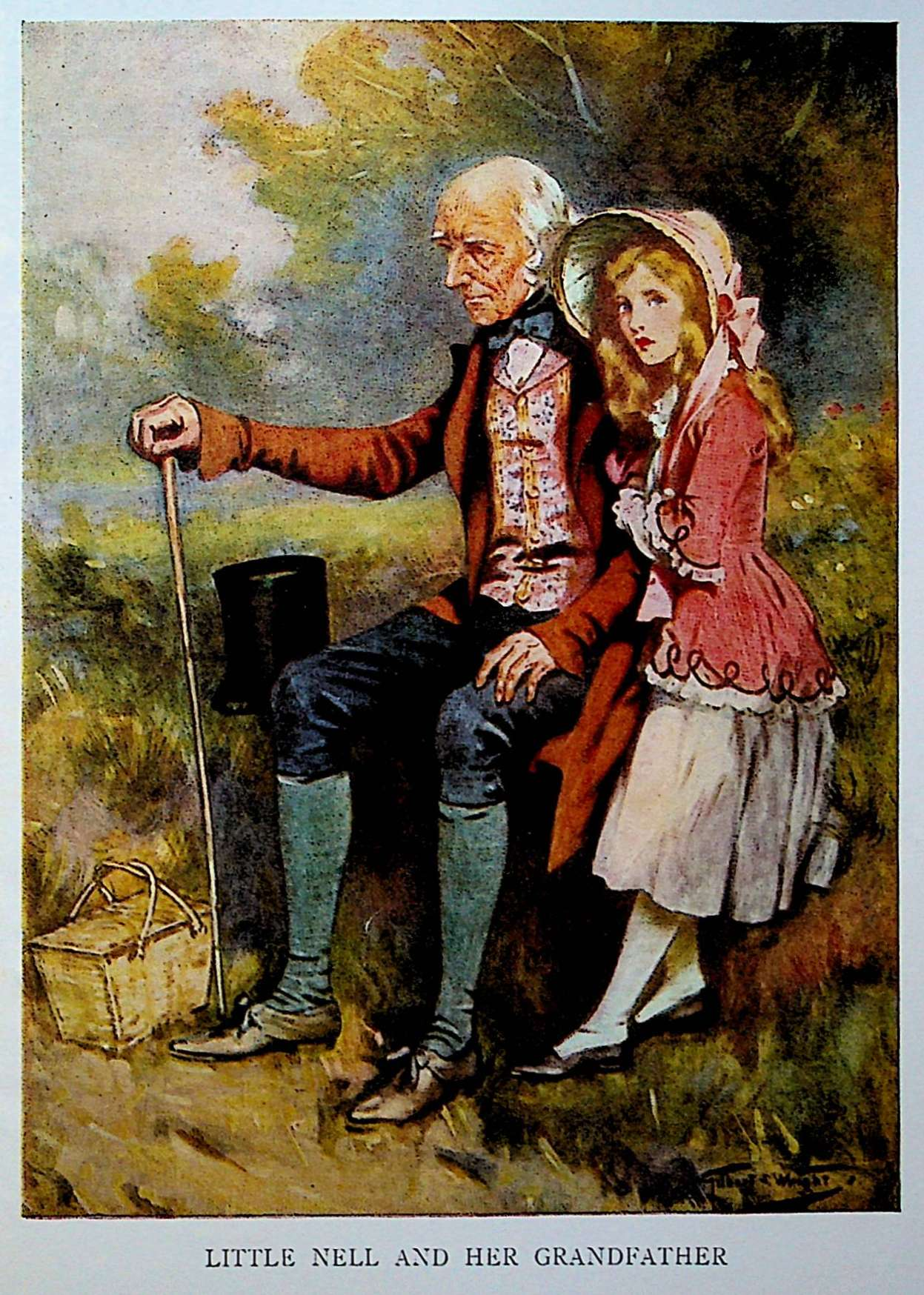
Little Nell and her Grandfather

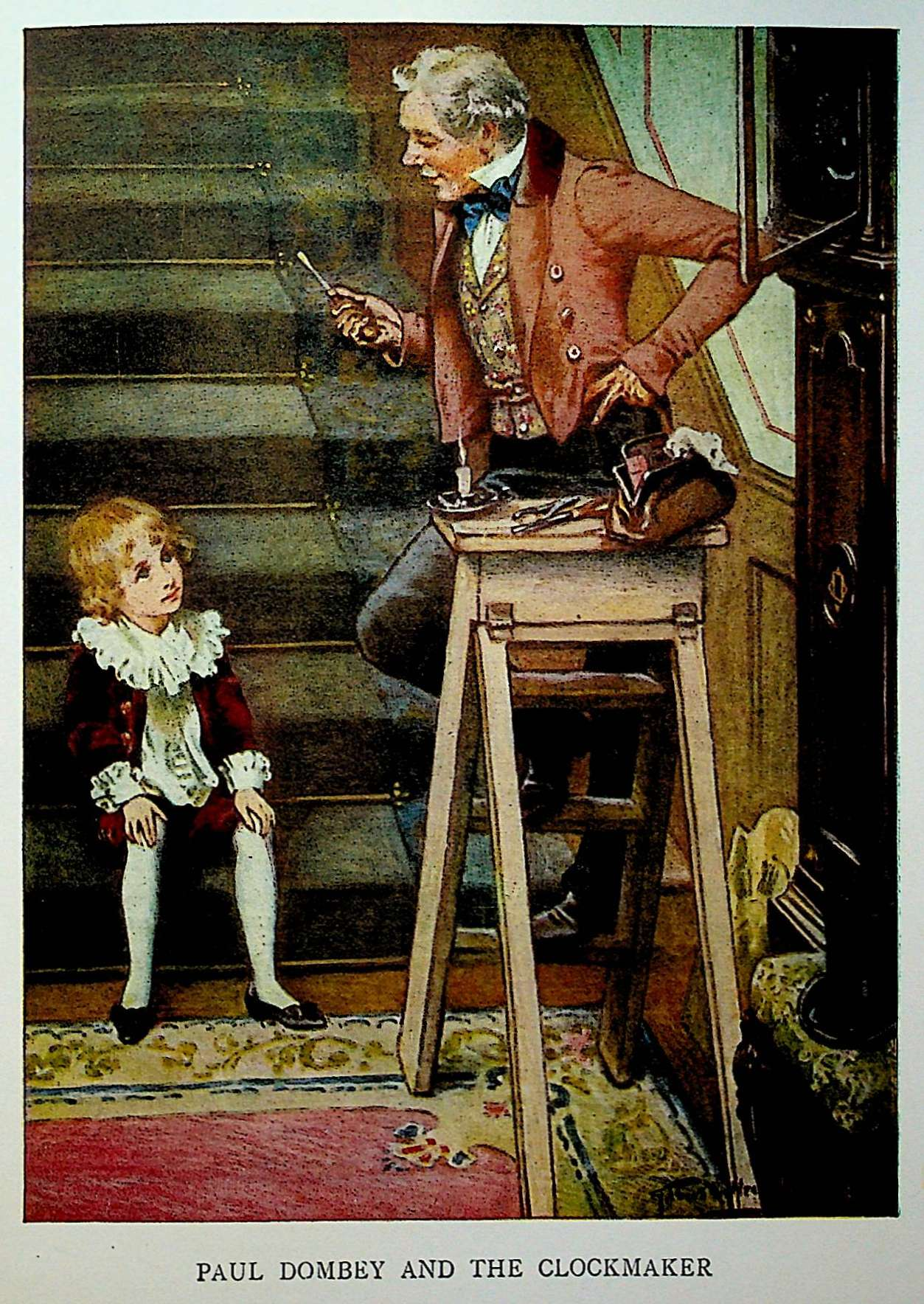
Paul Dombey and the Clockmaker

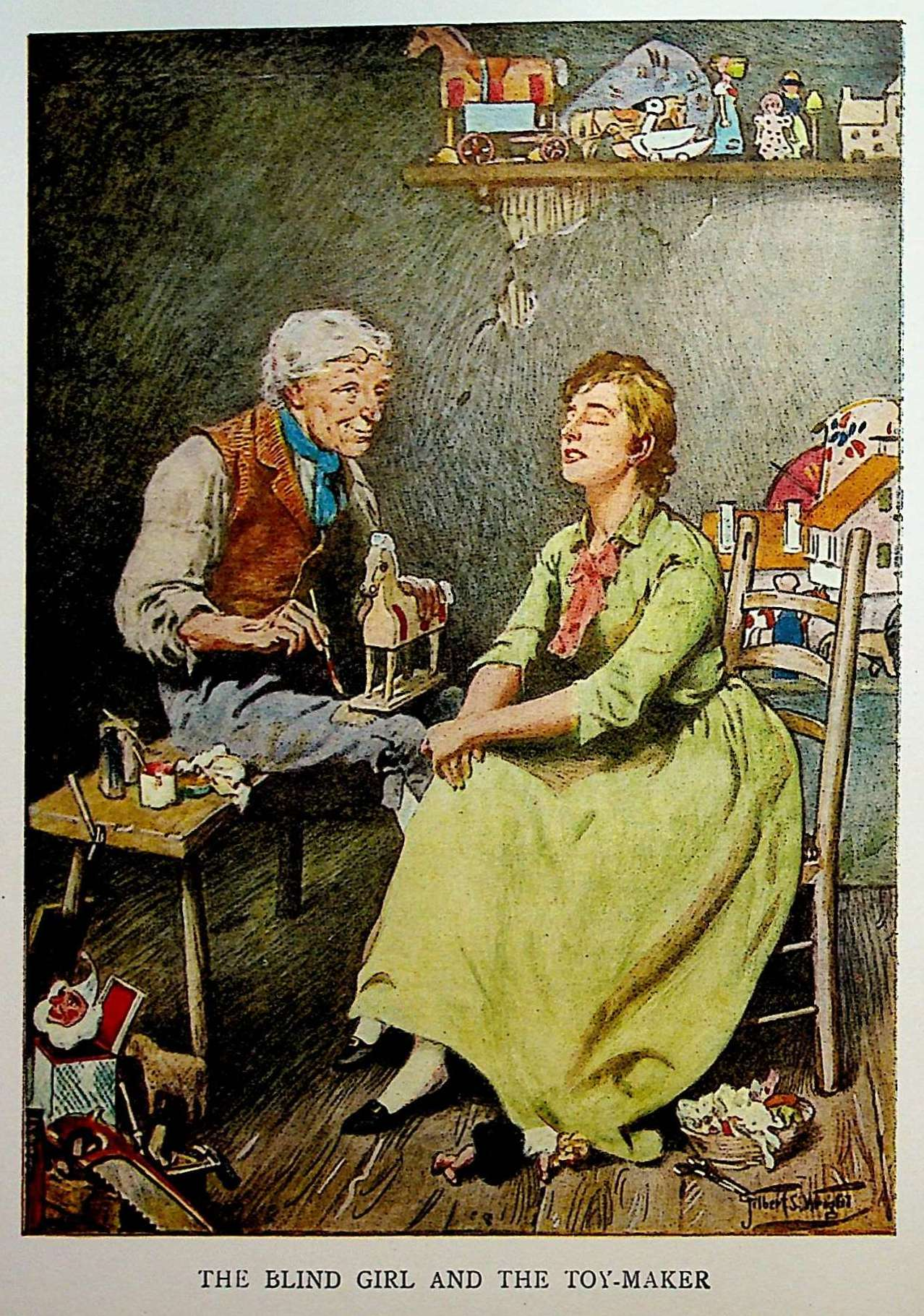
The Blind Girl and the Toymaker

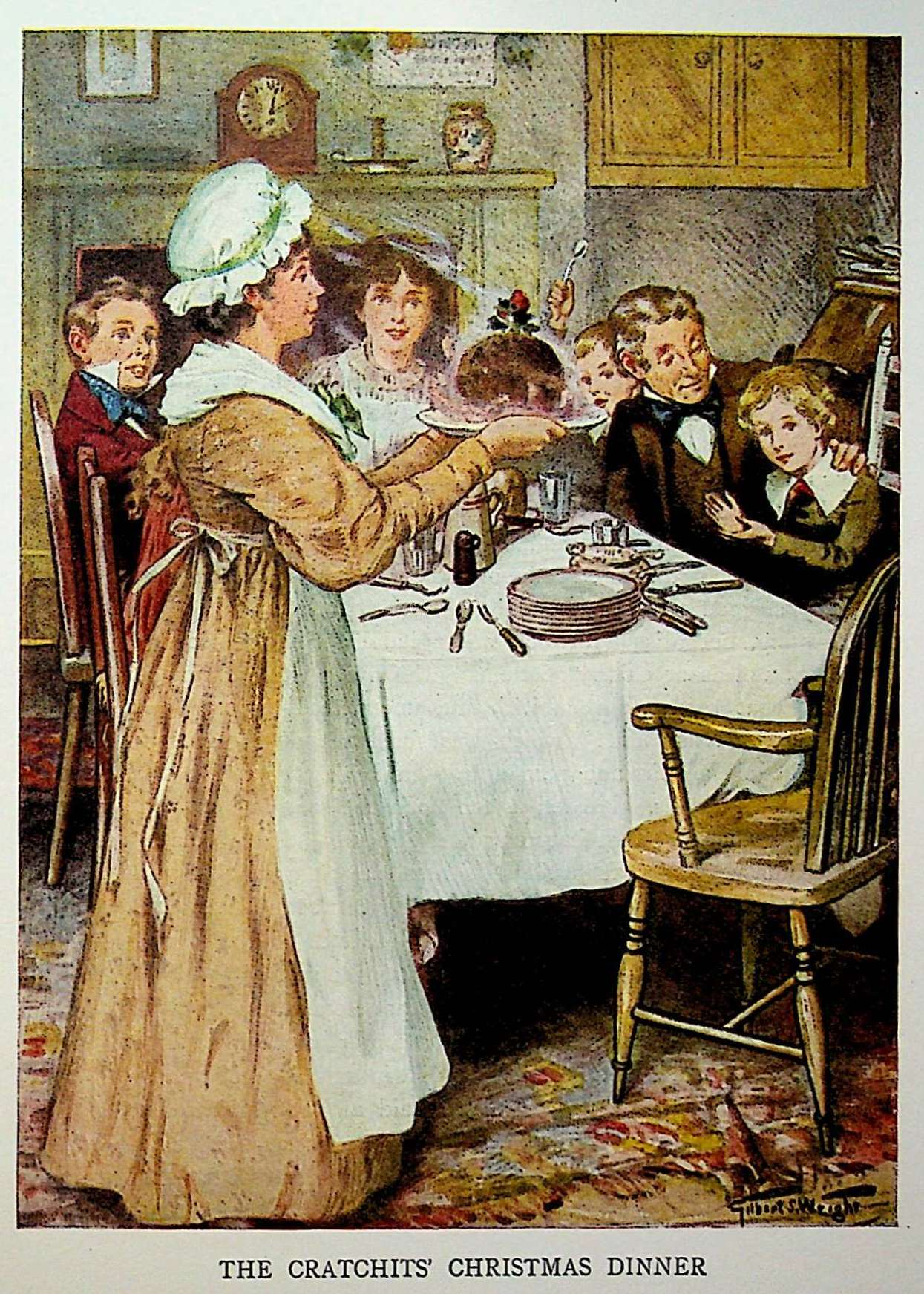
The Cratchits' Christmas Dinner

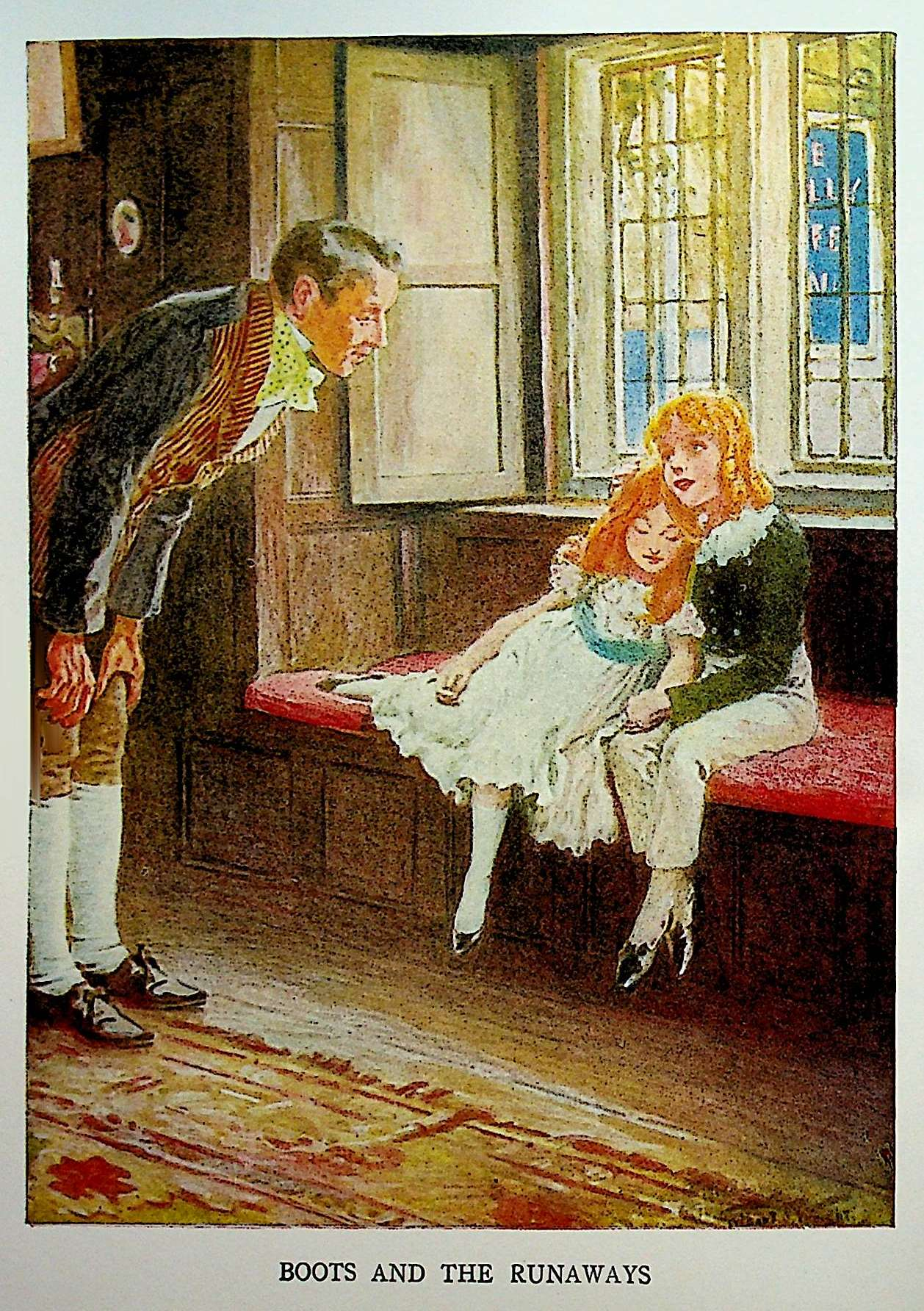
Boots and the Runaways

== Auction prices ==
The prices Wright can command are similar to those of his brother George. Record auction prices include:

- London, 27 September 1989, Stage for the London to Exeter Coach (oil on canvas. 61x81.5 cm) 19,800 GBP
- New York, Meet at the start of the Hunt (oil on canvas. 40.6x60.9 cm) US$18,400
- New York, 12 April 1996, The Day the Stagecoach Passes Through (oil on canvas. 54x91.4 cm) US$23,000
- London, 10 November 1999, Passing the Briqhton to London Coach (oil on canvas 61x91 cm) 17,000 GBP
