= Journal of Behavioral Decision Making =

Academic journal

- Discipline: Applied psychology
- Language: English
- Edited by: George Wright

Publication details
- History: 1988–present
- Publisher: John Wiley & Sons
- Frequency: 5/year
- Impact factor: 2.438 (2020)

Standard abbreviations
- ISO 4: J. Behav. Decis. Mak.

Indexing
- CODEN: BDMAEU
- ISSN: 0894-3257 (print); 1099-0771 (web)
- LCCN: sn87002891
- OCLC no.: 980556051

Links
- Journal homepage; Online access; Online archive

The Journal of Behavioral Decision Making is a peer-reviewed academic journal covering the study of psychological decision-making processes. It was established in 1988 and is published five times per year by John Wiley & Sons. The editor-in-chief is George Wright (Strathclyde Business School). According to the Journal Citation Reports, the journal has a 2020 impact factor of 2.438, ranking it 52nd out of 83 journals in the category "Psychology, Applied".
