= George Wright (artist) =

Painter of hunting, coaching, and equestrian scenes

- Born: 30 June 1860; Leeds, Yorkshire, England
- Died: 11 March 1944 (aged 83); Seaford, Sussex, England
- Occupations: Painter and Illustrator
- Years active: 1894 – 1929
- Known for: Painting hunting and coaching scenes

George Wright (30 June 1860 – 11 March 1944) (Note: Most sources give the year of his death as 1942,, while both Wood and Coysh give the year as 1940. However, when his wife died in November 1943, she was described as Wright's wife, rather than widow. The only death record in the national index that matches George Wright's details is in the first quarter of 1944, and the UK probate record gives his date of death as 11 March 1944. The probate records for both George and his wife name his brother Gilbert Scott Wright as their executor.) was a painter in oils whose subjects were mainly drawn from hunting, with which he was familiar, being a fox-hunter himself, coaching and other equestrian topics. George Wright was one of the foremost equestrian artists of his time. He was one of a family of seven children, five of whom were professional artists, either principally as painters, or as illustrators.

Wright is sometimes confused with George Wright (1851 – 1 February 1916), a Scottish landscape painter who lived in Annan. (Note: Graves mixes the Scottish George Wright's only work (Note: Johnson-Greutzner shows only one work by the Scottish George Wright being shown at the Royal Academy, with 14 shown at the Glasgow Institute of Fine Art and 33 shown at the Royal Scottish Academy.) shown at the Royal Academy in with the works shown by Wright.) (Note: The Scots George Wright was the second son of John and Margaret Wright. He was born and schooled in Annan, and was apprentices to a local painter, decorator, and sign writer John Clemson. He served as Art Master at Annan Academy.)

== Biography ==
Wright was born in Leeds on 30 June 1860. His father was George Edward Wright (24 February 1834 – 11 November 1916), an accountant and Elizabeth Scott (c. 1840 – 31 May 1916), the daughter or Thomas Scott (born c. 1804), variously a railway engineer and a commission agent. George Edward and Elizabeth were married on 22 August 1859 in St. Jude's Church at Hunslet, Leeds, Yorkshire, England.

The Wrights had seven children, five of whom were artists:

- George Wright, the eldest, and the subject of this article.
- Louise Wright, born 5 September 1863, a fashion illustrator. (Note: Louise Wright was one of the leading illustrators selected by Percy Bradshaw for inclusion in his The Art of the Illustrator which presented a separate portfolio for each of twenty illustrators. The portfolio contained: a brief biography of Wright, an illustration of Wright at work in her studio, a sample of Wright's signature, an explanation of Wright's method of working-up the attached plates. The final plate showing an illustration typical of her work and five other plates showed the work at five earlier stages of its production, from the first rough to the just before the finished drawing or colour sketch. Wright's black and white illustration shows two fashion models as the detail of the clothing is built up.)
- Mabel Wright, born on 26 May 1867. One of only two siblings who were not professional artists. (Note: She married Bertie Neville Tennant (Note: Tennant was from the Sheffield family of brewers of that name.) (birth registered in the last quarter of 1869 (Note: While his birth was registered in the last quarter of 1869, his age is shown as two on the 1871 census. If he had been born in the last quarter of 1869 he could only have been 18 months old at the time of the census.) – probably in the first quarter of 1927 (Note: The reason for the lack of certainty is that while the age, first name, and initial match, no corroborating probate or newspaper records were found. It appears that Maud had remarried by 1939.)). The couple were married at St Martin-in-the-Fields, London, on 24 January 1891. In 1939 a Mabel Marston, a widow with the same date of birth as Mabel Wright, was living with the three sister's Louise, Ethel, and Constance, at the Best family home at 131 Woodham Lane, Richmond, Surrey. This suggests that Mabel had remarried and been widowed for a second time. In 1939 a Mabel Marston, a widow with the same date of birth as Mabel Wright, was living with the three sister's Louise, Ethel, and Constance, at the Best family home at 131 Woodham Lane, Richmond, Surrey. This suggests that Mabel had remarried and been widowed for a second time.)
- Ethel Wright, born 11 October 1870, was the second of the sibling who was not a professional artist. She was living with her sisters at 131 Woodham lane in September 1939.
- Constance Wright (5 March 1877 – second quarter of 1973), described as a fashion artist in the 1911 census. (Note: She married insurance broker Cecil Arthur Best (22 September 1881 – 7 July 1959) on 28 October 1911, at St Augustine's, Honor Oak Park. The couple had at least one child, a boy, Anthony Allen Best (15 April 1913 – 24 March 1998), who also became an insurance broker.. Their life was interrupted by the first World War, but Best served at home throughout, winning the Meritorious Service Medal for his service. (Note: Best had already served five years in the reserve from 1903. He enlisted on 17 October 1914, was promoted to Corporal on 1 February 1915, promoted to acting Lance Sergeant on 15 July 1915, and to acting Quartermaster Sergeant on 13 August 1916. He demobilised on 18 March 1919. His initial posting was in the 24th (County of London) Battalion (The Queen's), but was immediately transferred to the 7th (City of London) Battalion, London Regiment and eventually, on 29 April 1916, to the Royal Defence Corps (where his regimental number was 3 - indicating that he was the third person to be enlisted in that Corps). He was usually placed on the Headquarters Staff of the units he served in.))
- Philip Wright, (c. 2 February 1878 (Note: Date of birth calculated from Army Records, as he gave his age as 37 years and 313 days when enlisting on 12 December 1915.) – 11 July 1926), (Note: His probate record gives his date of death as 11 July 1926, while his grave marker gives it as 12 July 1926.) described as a fashion artist in the 1901 and the 1911 census. (Note: Bradshaw said that he concentrated on Fashion after a good deal of experience as a general illustrator) (Note: He married Marion Broughton Barrett on 4 June 1910. The couple had a son, David, born on 12 December 1912 at home at 12 Gaynesford Road, Forest Hill. Philip enlisted on 12 December 1915, and was immediately assigned to the Army Reserve. He was mobilised on 4 December 1916 as a Gunner in the Royal Garrison Artillery. He saw service in Italy with 6 inch siege batteries No. 317 and No. 390, and was demobilised in March 1919. He is buried with his parents at Dulwich Old Cemetery in London.)
- Gilbert Scott Wright, (24 July 1880 – 1958), an artist who worked with his brother George in his early years and also painted sporting and coaching scenes. He served as executor for his brother Philip, and for his parents.

George married Rose Ellen Tribe (14 December 1864 – 13 November 1943) (Note: She gives her date of birth in the 1939 Register as 14 December 1864. However, her baptismal records show that she was baptised on 27 April 1864, and born on 14 December 1863.) of Leeds, the daughter of Edward Tribe, (born c.1817) a publican and Kezia Tribe (born c. 1925), on 30 March 1885 at the parish church of Wrangthorn, Yorkshire. The couple had two daughters:

- Florence Bensley Wright, born 16 December 1886.
- Enid Wright, baptised 1 June 1888.

Wright moved to Rugby in 1901, and was living in Oxford by 1908 and had moved to Richmond by 1929. He was living at 5 King's Road, Richmond, Surrey in September 1939 along with his wife Rose Ellen and his sister Ethel. He moved to Seaford later on in the year. Wright was living at 3 Queens Park Gardens, Seaford, Sussex in 1943 when his wife died on 13 November. He survived her by only a few months, dying on 11 March 1944 at the same address. Both husband and wife choose his brother Gilbert Scott Wright as an executor.

== Work ==
The details of his early working life are not known. Like the rest of his family, he had no formal training in art, but had to learn as he progressed. However, as he left a large number of oil canvasses from his early period painted en Grisaille (Note: This is essentially painting in monochrome.) it is assumed that he was doing a lot of illustration work. Wright was known for painting strong and well-finished hunting and coaching scenes, and for his horse portraits.

From 1901, when he moved to Rugby, he began to paint polo matches as well. From 1925 he was under commission from both by 1925 was under commission to Ackermanns in the U.K. and Grand Central Galleries in New York. These were major publishers of prints. As well as commercial galleries, Wright exhibited six times at the Walker Gallery and 33 times at the Royal Academy. He often painted his pictures in pairs.

Wright collaborated with his brother Gilbert Scott Wright, who was twenty years his junior, (Note: Bradshaw reports that by age 12, Gilbert was producing saleable paintings in oils.) in producing paintings of sporting and coaching scenes for calendars and other work. They collaborated until about 1925. Wright also produced postcards, designing the Sporting Pictures range for E. W. Savoury. (Note: E. W. Savory were chromolithographic printers and fine art publishers. The produced a series of artist signed postcards. Their subjects were mainly landscapes, though other themes, including hunting, were produced as well.)

=== Example of hunting and coaching paintings ===
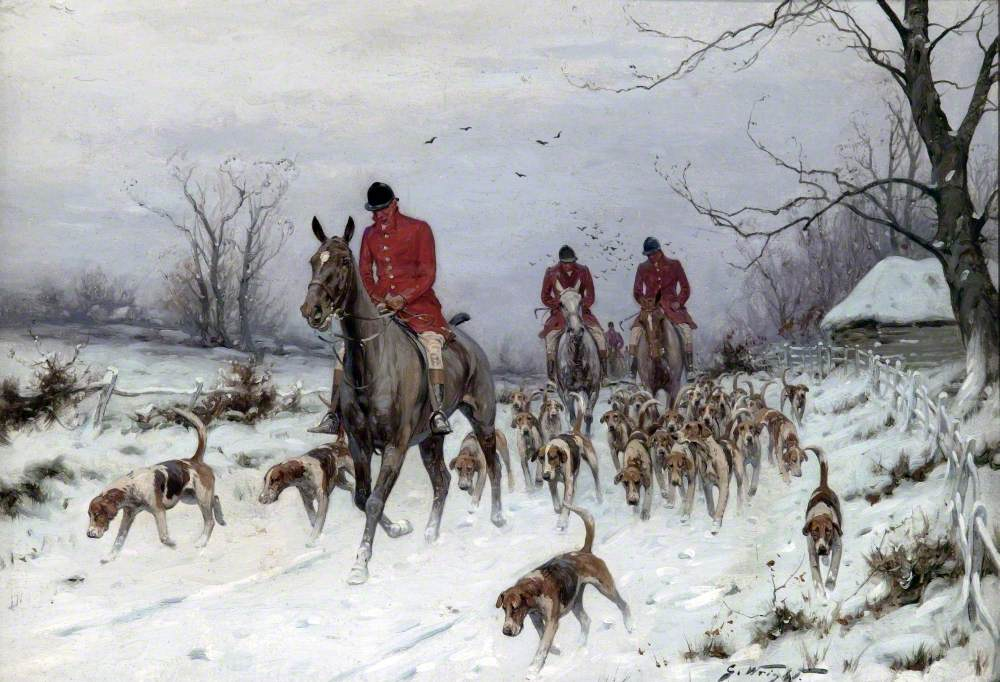
Huntsmen and hounds returning home in the snow

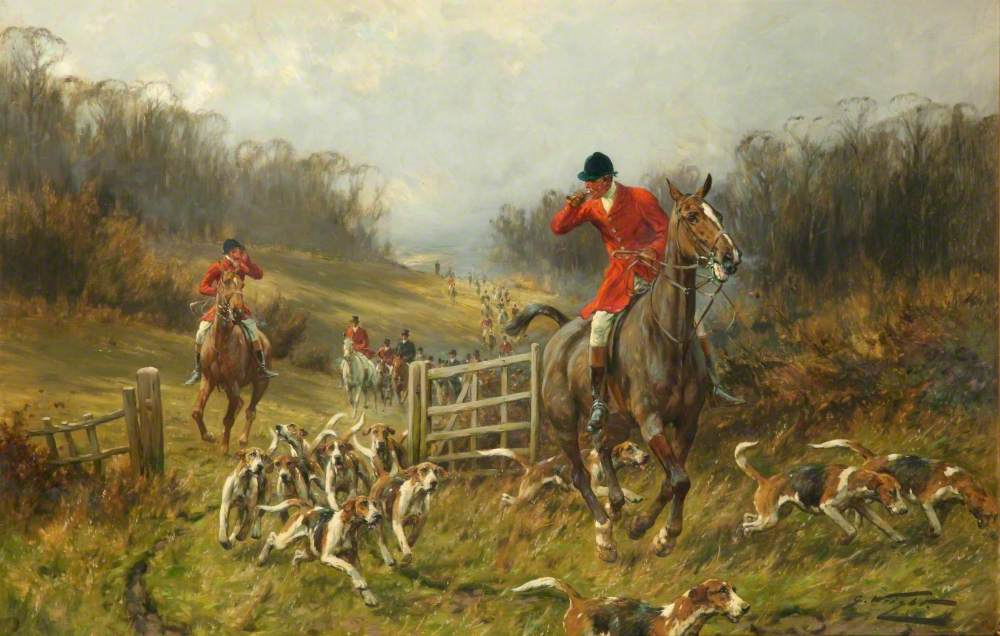
Huntsmen and hounds going away in full cry

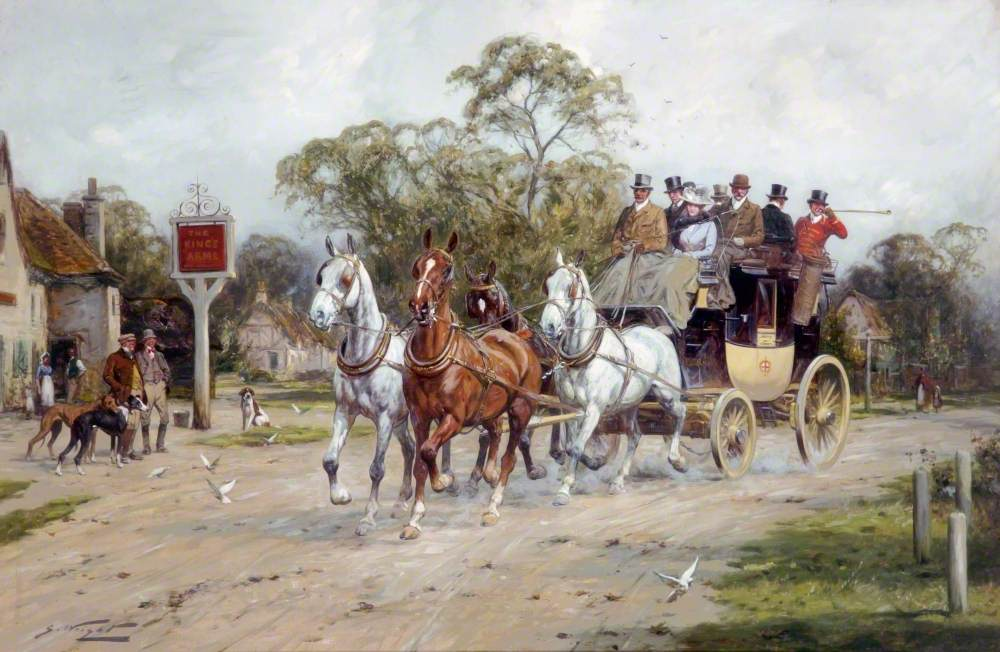
A coach passing the King's Arms

== Assessment ==
Bradshaw said that Wright was chiefly known for his jolly sporting prints—pictures of Georgian huntsmen, "Gentlemen of the Road" and other "horsey" types who are always certain of popularity on the walls of the R.A. and in print-shop windows all over the World. Wood states that he painted in a lively and realistic style. Victoria Fine art states that He painted superb horse portraits and very good action pictures, particularly of hunting and coaching. His work is strong and well finished. He was one of the best sporting painters of his time.

Wright's work can command attractive prices at auction. Record auction prices include:

- New York, 19 June 1981, Channel Crossing (1889, oil on canvas remounted on hardboard 61x101.6 cm) US$37,000
- New York, 9 June 1988, Frank Freeman, Pytchley Whipper-In (oil on canvas, 76.2x96.5 cm) US$28,600
- London, 3 Nov 1989. A Future Darby Winner on the Downs near Marlborough (oil on canvas, 56x91.5 cm) 28.000 GBP
- London 15 June 2000, York to London Stagecoach Meets the Hunt (oil on canvas, 45x76 cm) 14,000 GBP
- New York. 27 May 2004, Horses Being Groomed in Courtyard (oil on canvas. 55x91 cm) US$20,000
