= George Wright (psychologist) =

British psychologist

George Wright (born 24 November 1952) is a British psychologist.

Wright completed a BSc degree in psychology at the University of London, followed by a master's degree and doctorate in the same subject from Brunel University London. In 2013, Wright earned a DSc from the University of Warwick.

Wright has taught at several institutions throughout his career, including Leeds University Business School, London Business School, Strathclyde Business School, Durham Business School, and Warwick Business School. Wright has served as chief editor of the Journal of Behavioral Decision Making since the publication was founded in 1988.
