= George Wright (priest) =

George Wright was an Anglican priest in Ireland in the 17th century.

Wright was ordained in 1621; and was Archdeacon of Dromore from 1629 until the Irish Rebellion of 1641.
