= George Wright Society =

Nonprofit association of conservation

The George Wright Society (GWS) is a nonprofit association that promotes conservation of parks, protected and conserved areas, and cultural/historic sites worldwide. GWS also promotes other forms of place-based stewardship. Founded in 1980, GWS is named after George Meléndez Wright, the first scientist to work for the U.S. National Park Service and the initiator of the first systematic surveys of wildlife in U.S. national park units.

GWS members includes researchers, managers, administrators, educators, practitioners, and others who are interested in conservation.

GWS promotes professional research and resource stewardship across all the natural and cultural resource disciplines that are required for modern-day park management. GWS's unique role is to foster interdisciplinary place-based conservation. Specialist organizations and subject-matter professional societies create essential knowledge. GWS operates one level up from that endeavor by bringing specialists together from across disciplines to look for interdisciplinary solutions to conservation problems.

== The Society ==
GWS was founded in 1980 by Robert M. Linn and Theodore Sudia, both former chief scientists of the U.S. National Park Service.

GWS was formed in response to a need raised during the first and second national conferences on science in the U.S. national parks (1976 and 1979): for a professional association to exchange information useful to natural and cultural resource management. Building on those meetings, GWS organized its first national conference in 1982. From then through 2017, GWS held regular conferences on two- to three-year intervals. These events eventually drew over 1,000 people from the US, Canada, and occasionally other countries. It is the only regularly scheduled large-scale interdisciplinary parks conference. The conference is currently (2021) on hiatus.

== Membership ==
Membership in the GWS is open to anyone. Most members come from the U.S. and Canada. Members come from fields such as archaeology, biology, history, social science, air and water quality, environmental ethics, and many others.

== Scope and Activities ==
GWS is concerned with the following areas:

- parks at all levels: national/federal, state/provincial, county, and city
- historic, archaeological, and other cultural sites; cultural landscapes; protected landscapes/seascapes
- research areas and designated wilderness within national and state forests; other protected natural areas
- national and state/provincial wildlife refuges, and other similar protected public lands
- natural and cultural areas and sites administered by tribal nations and/or indigenous people; community-conserved areas; sacred natural sites
- marine protected areas; estuarine, freshwater, and other aquatic sanctuaries
- private land-trust reserves
- Indigenous protected and conserved areas (IPCAs)
- Other effective means of place-based conservation (OECMs in the parlance of the International Union for Conservation of Nature)

== Activities ==
Every two years, GWS has organized the George Wright Society Conference on Parks, Protected Areas, and Cultural Sites. The typical attendance is over 1,000 people. Recent conferences have included sessions on inventory and monitoring, remote sensing, wilderness, climate change, and cultural heritage interpretation.

Between 1981 and 2018, GWS published The George Wright Forum: the society's journal on parks, protected areas, and cultural sites. Issues focused on such topics as environmental history and U.S. national parks, civic engagement, integrating science and management, and the 100th anniversary of Parks Canada.

In January 2020, GWS teamed up with the UC Berkeley Institute for Parks, People, and Biodiversity to found Parks Stewardship Forum. The Parks Stewardship Forum, "explores innovative thinking and offers enduring perspectives on critical issues across the whole spectrum of place-based heritage management and stewardship. It is the only professional conservation journal with an interdisciplinary focus, publishing insights from all fields related to parks, protected areas, cultural sites, and other forms of place-based conservation."

GWS has also sponsored the George Melendez Wright Student Travel Scholarship aimed at minority students, and a Native Participant Travel Grant Program, aimed at native people in the Americas. Both programs send recipients to the GWS conference; and to Park Break, a week-long, in-park seminar where graduate students learn about research and resource management issues in the host park.

GWS publishes Parkwire, a daily news digest with links to research and resource management news from parks, protected areas, and cultural sites worldwide. GWS also convenes an Indigenous Involvement Working Group, led by Indigenous members of the Society's board of directors. The IIWG explores conservation/stewardship/relationship issues of interest to Native people.
