= Toll Mountain =

Mountain in Texas, United States

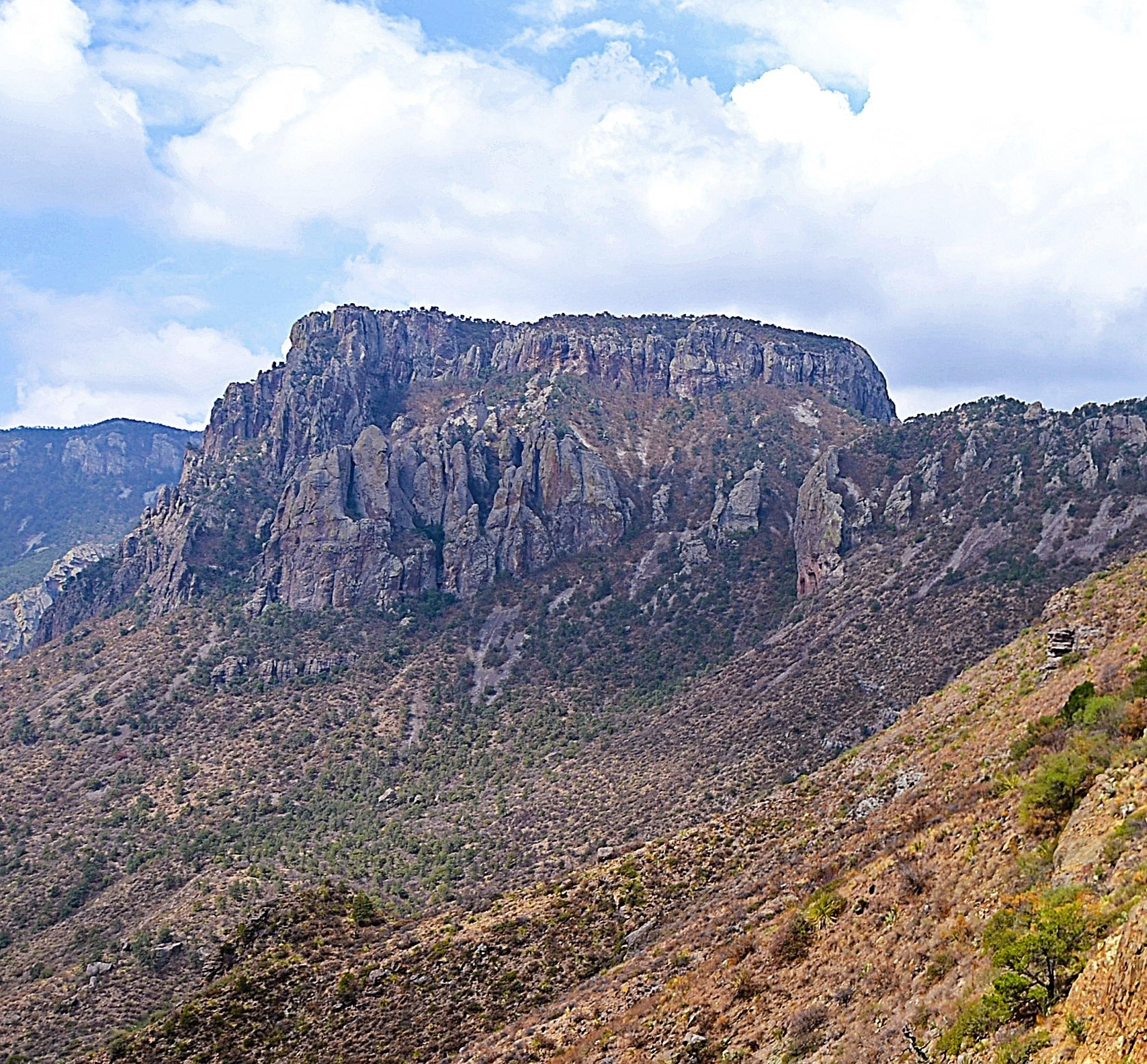
- Northeast aspect

Highest point
- Elevation: 7,409 ft (2,258 m)
- Prominence: 419 ft (128 m)
- Parent peak: Emory Peak (7,825 ft)
- Isolation: 1.04 mi (1.67 km)
- Coordinates: 29°15′16″N 103°17′27″W

Naming
- Etymology: Roger W. Toll

Geography
- Location within Texas Location within the United States
- Country: United States
- State: Texas
- County: Brewster
- Protected area: Big Bend National Park
- Parent range: Chisos Mountains
- Topo map: USGS The Basin

Geology
- Rock age: Oligocene
- Rock type: Extrusive volcanic rock

Climbing
- Easiest route: class 2

Toll Mountain is a 7,409-foot-elevation (2,258-meter) summit in Brewster County, Texas, United States.

== Description ==
Toll Mountain is located in the Chisos Mountains. It ranks as the fourth-highest peak in Big Bend National Park, Brewster County, and the Chisos Mountains, but only the 25th-highest in Texas. The mountain is composed of extrusive volcanic rock which formed during the Oligocene period. Based on the Köppen climate classification, Toll Mountain is located in a hot arid climate zone with hot summers and mild winters. Any scant precipitation runoff from the mountain's slopes drains into Oak Creek, Blue Creek, and Juniper Draw which are all part of the Rio Grande watershed. Topographic relief is significant as the summit rises 2,600 feet (792 m) above Juniper Canyon in one mile (1.6 km). The lower slopes of the peak are covered by juniper, oak, and piñon. The mountain's toponym was officially adopted in 1948 by the United States Board on Geographic Names to remember Roger W. Toll (1883–1936), American mountaineer, writer, and a National Park Service official who served as the superintendent of Mount Rainier, Rocky Mountain, and Yellowstone National Parks, and was instrumental in establishing Big Bend National Park. He is also the namesake of Mount Toll in Colorado. In 1936, Roger Toll was part of an international commission to investigate the potential values of a protected area to straddle the Rio Grande area of Texas and Mexico. The report was enthusiastic and the commission endorsed the national park idea. Tragically, Roger Toll and George Wright were killed in a car accident on their return from Texas. Toll and Wright Mountains were named in their memory.

== See also ==
- List of mountain peaks of Texas
- Geography of Texas

== Gallery ==
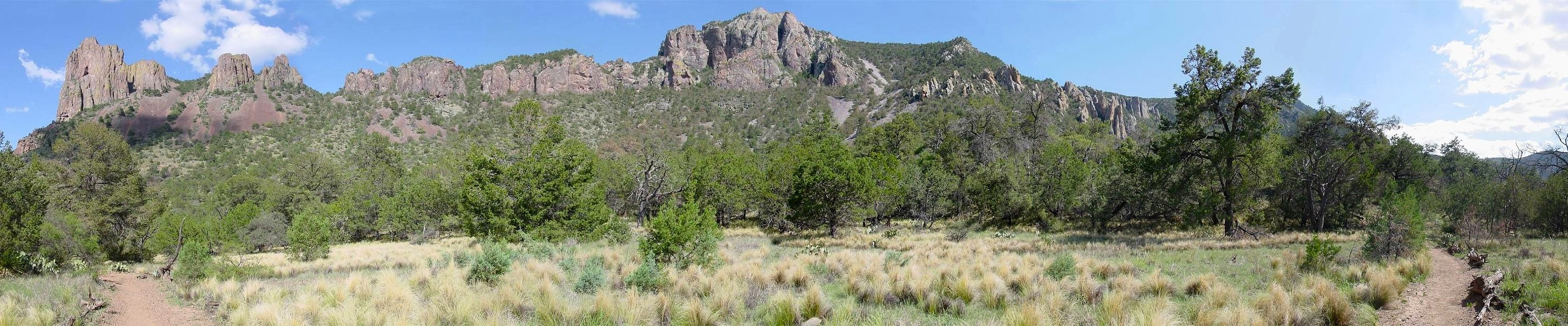
West aspect of Toll Mountain centered. Casa Grande Peak to left.

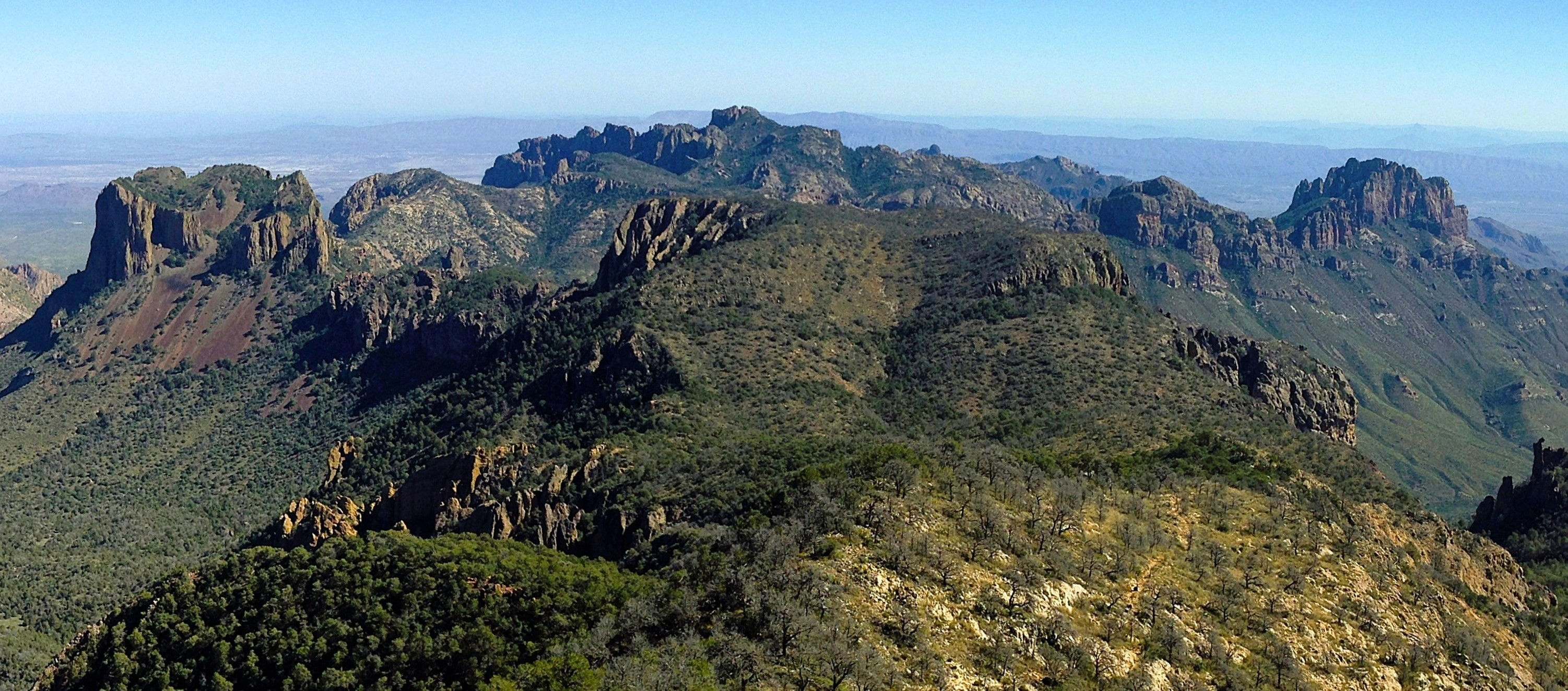
View from Emory Peak with flat-topped Toll Mountain centered.
Lost Mine Peak centered beyond. Casa Grande Peak to left, Crown Mountain to right. Camera pointed northeast.

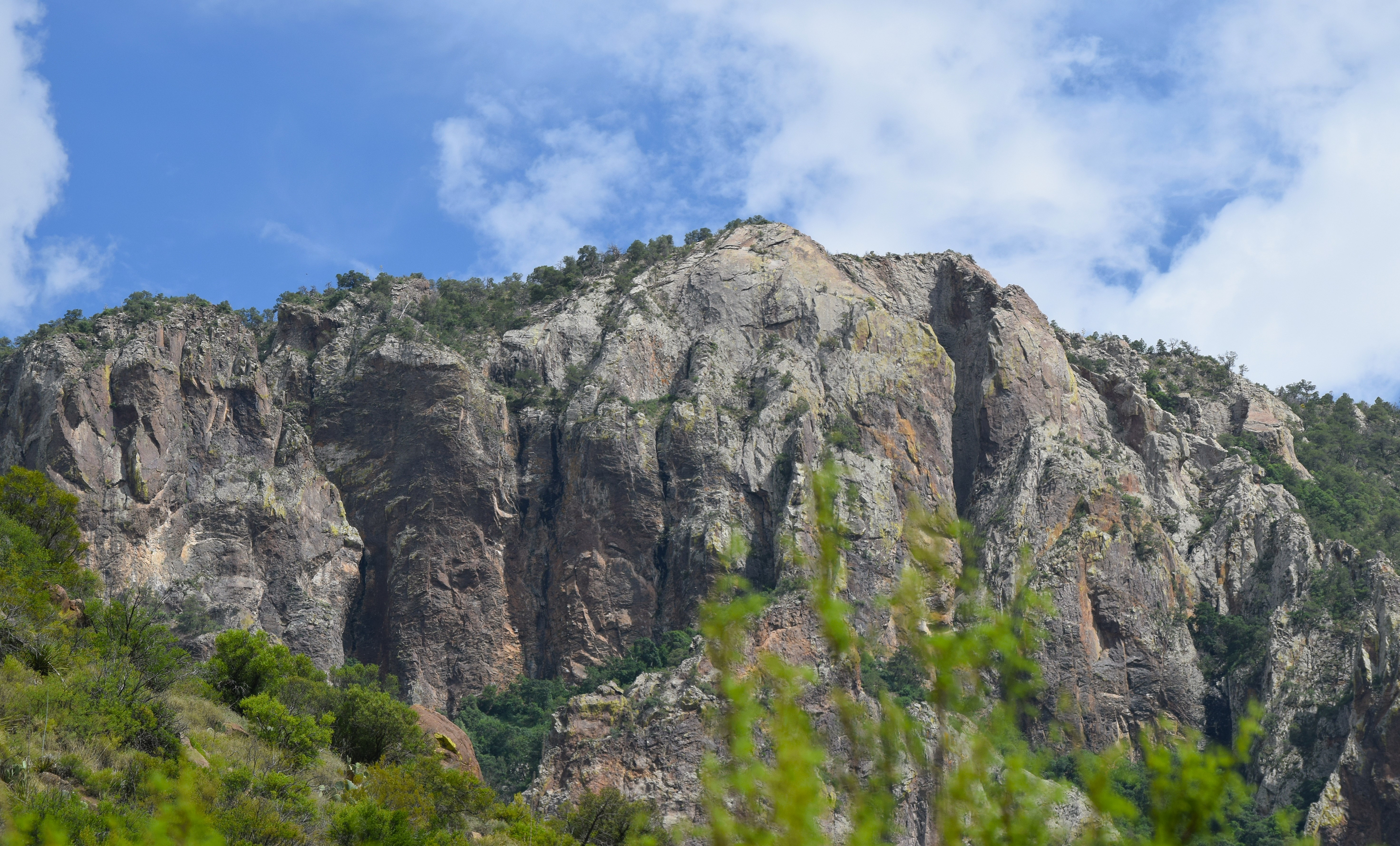
West aspect
