= Pummel =

Pummel may refer to:

- Strike (attack) someone in sports, combat, and some martial arts
- Pummel (album), of 1995 by punk rock band All
- Pummel Peak, a mountain in Texas, United States

== See also ==
- Pommel (disambiguation)
