= Elephant Tusk (Texas) =

Mountain in Texas, United States

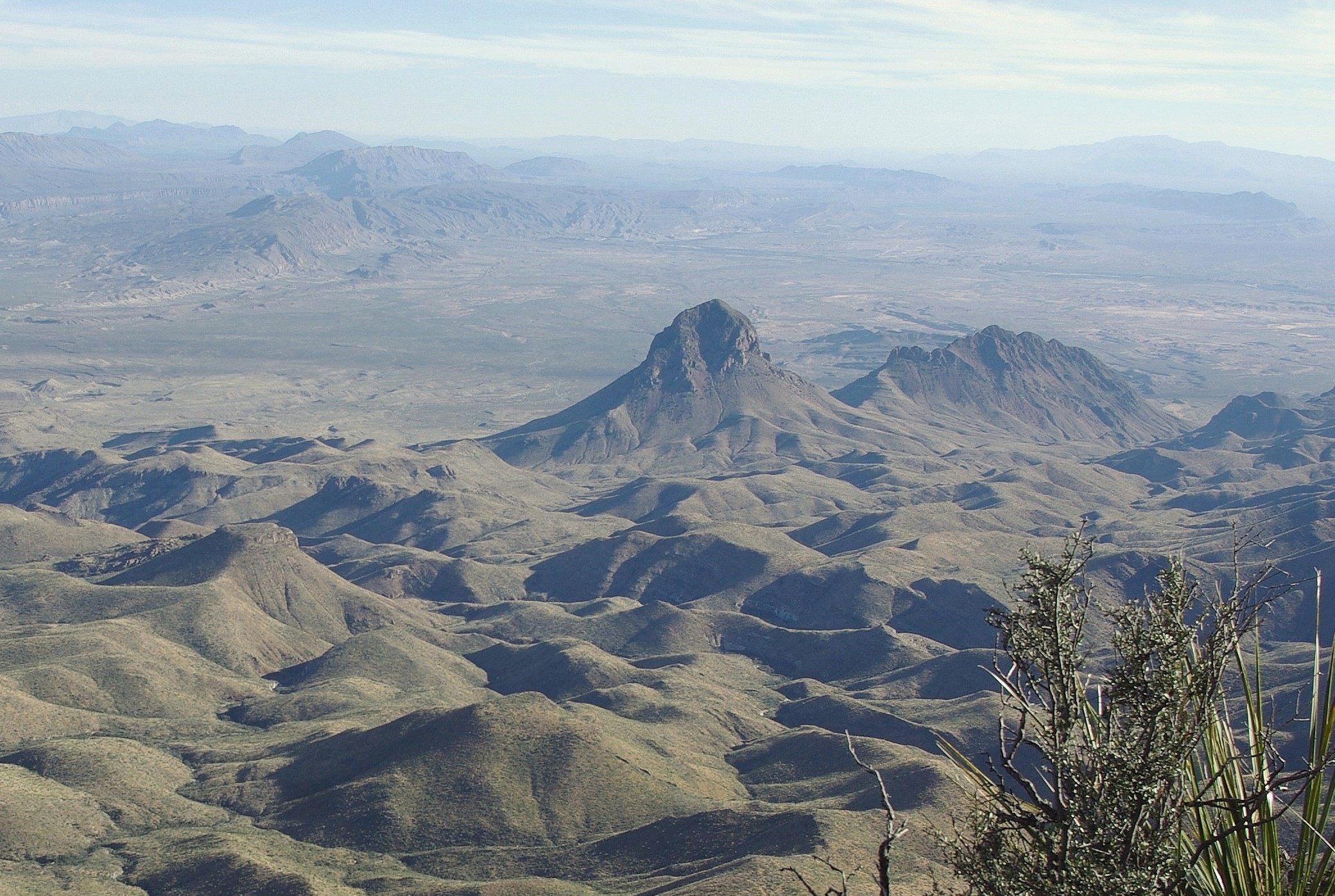
- North aspect

Highest point
- Elevation: 5,254 ft (1,601 m)
- Prominence: 1,389 ft (423 m)
- Isolation: 2.13 mi (3.43 km)
- Coordinates: 29°09′26″N 103°16′04″W

Geography
- Location within Texas Location within the United States
- Country: United States
- State: Texas
- County: Brewster
- Protected area: Big Bend National Park
- Parent range: Chisos Mountains
- Topo map: USGS Emory Peak

Geology
- Rock age: Oligocene
- Rock type: Igneous rock

Climbing
- Easiest route: class 4 scrambling

Elephant Tusk is a 5,254-foot-elevation (1,601-meter) summit in Brewster County, Texas, United States.

== Description ==
Elephant Tusk is part of the Chisos Mountains where it is set in Big Bend National Park and the Chihuahuan Desert. The mountain is an igneous intrusion composed of rhyolite which formed 29 million years ago during the Oligocene period. Based on the Köppen climate classification, the mountain is located in a hot arid climate zone with hot summers and mild winters. Any scant precipitation runoff from the peak's slopes drains to the Rio Grande which is 11 miles (18 km) to the south. Topographic relief is significant as the summit rises 1,950 feet (594 m) above surrounding terrain in one-half mile (0.8 km). The mountain's toponym was officially adopted on March 9, 1939, by the United States Board on Geographic Names after having been marked as "Indianola Peak" on various maps dating back to 1905.

== See also ==
- Geography of Texas
- Volcanic plug

== Gallery ==
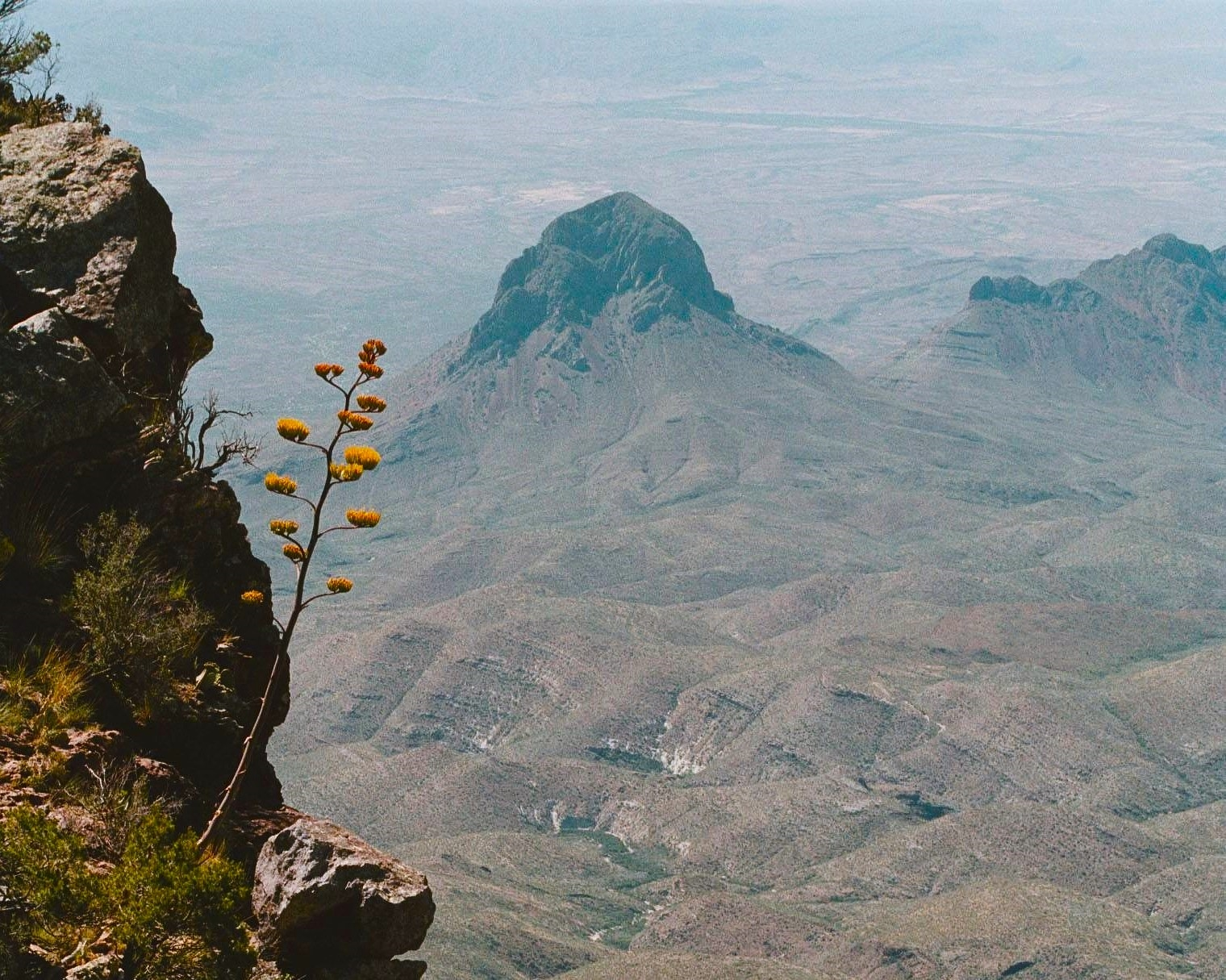

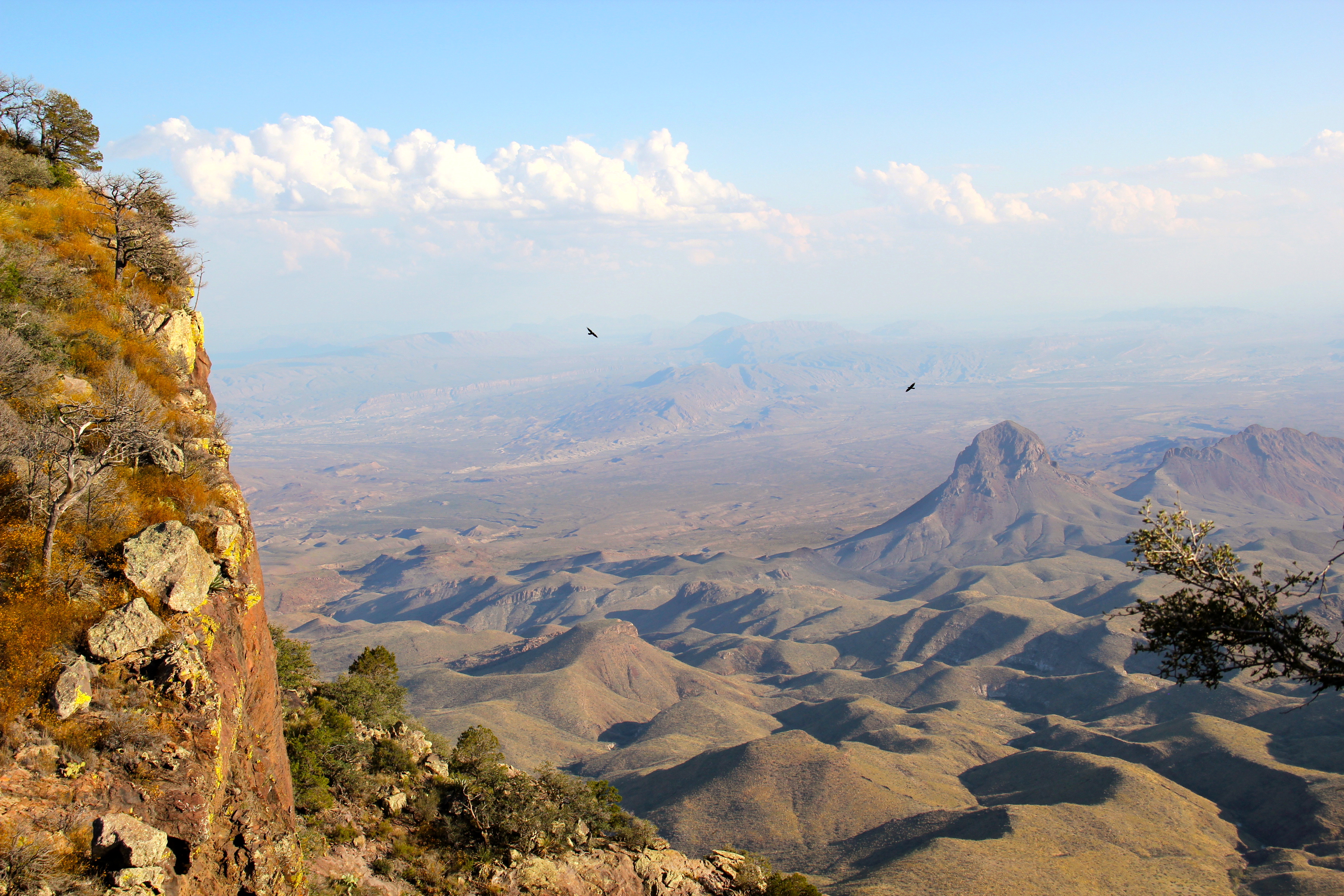
