= Townsend Point =

Mountain in Texas, United States

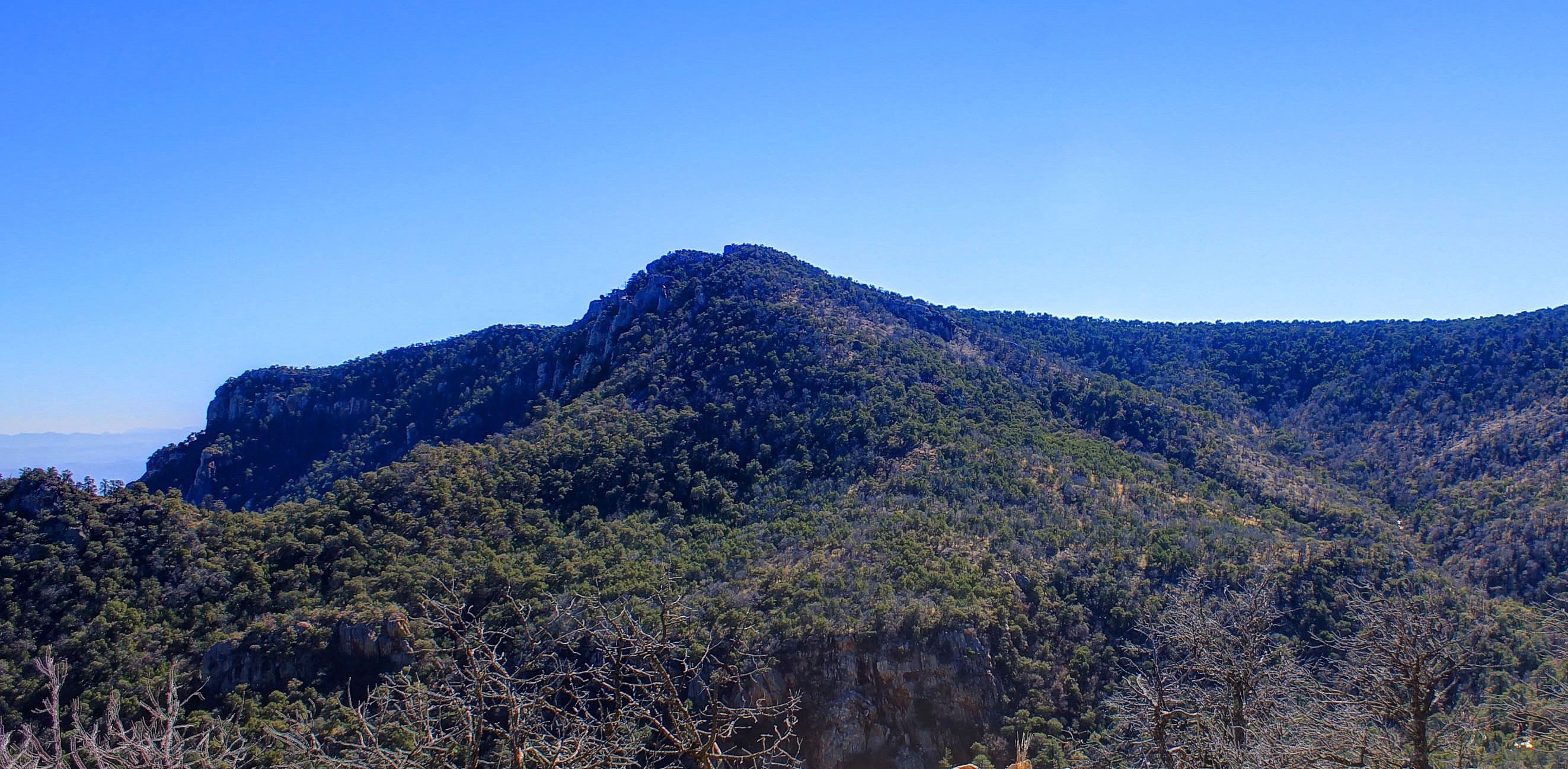
- Northwest aspect, from Emory Peak Trail

Highest point
- Elevation: 7,574 ft (2,309 m)
- Prominence: 422 ft (129 m)
- Parent peak: Emory Peak (7,825 ft)
- Isolation: 1.03 mi (1.66 km)
- Coordinates: 29°14′19″N 103°17′26″W

Naming
- Etymology: Everett Ewing Townsend

Geography
- Location within Texas Location within the United States
- Country: United States
- State: Texas
- County: Brewster
- Protected area: Big Bend National Park
- Parent range: Chisos Mountains
- Topo map: USGS Emory Peak

Geology
- Rock age: Oligocene
- Rock type: Extrusive volcanic rock

Climbing
- Easiest route: class 2

Townsend Point is a 7,574-foot-elevation (2,309-meter) mountain summit in Brewster County, Texas, United States.

== Description ==
Townsend Point is located in the Chisos Mountains. It ranks as the second-highest peak in Big Bend National Park, Brewster County, and the Chisos Mountains, but only the 19th-highest in Texas. The mountain is composed of extrusive volcanic rock which formed during the Oligocene period. The slopes of the peak are covered by juniper, oak, and piñon. Based on the Köppen climate classification, Townsend Point is located in a hot arid climate zone with hot summers and mild winters. Any scant precipitation runoff from the mountain's slopes drains into Fresno Creek and Juniper Draw which are both part of the Rio Grande watershed. Topographic relief is significant as the summit rises 3,250 feet (990 m) above Juniper Canyon in two miles (3.2 km). The mountain's toponym was officially adopted in 1981 by the United States Board on Geographic Names to remember Everett Ewing Townsend (1871–1948) who was responsible for founding Big Bend National Park.

== See also ==
- List of mountain peaks of Texas
- Geography of Texas

== Gallery ==
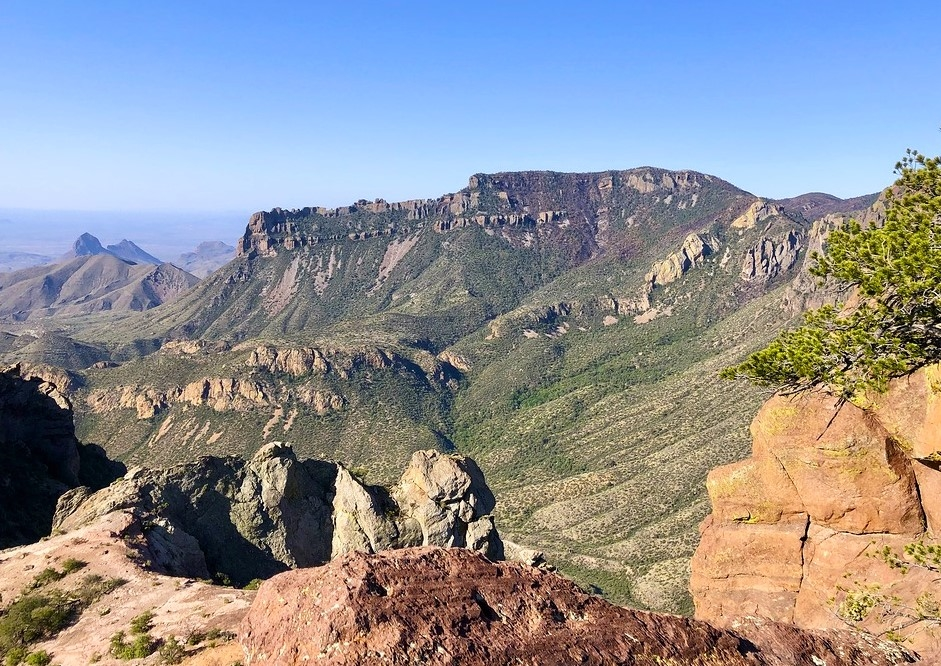
View from Lost Mine Trail with north aspect of Townsend Point in the distance.

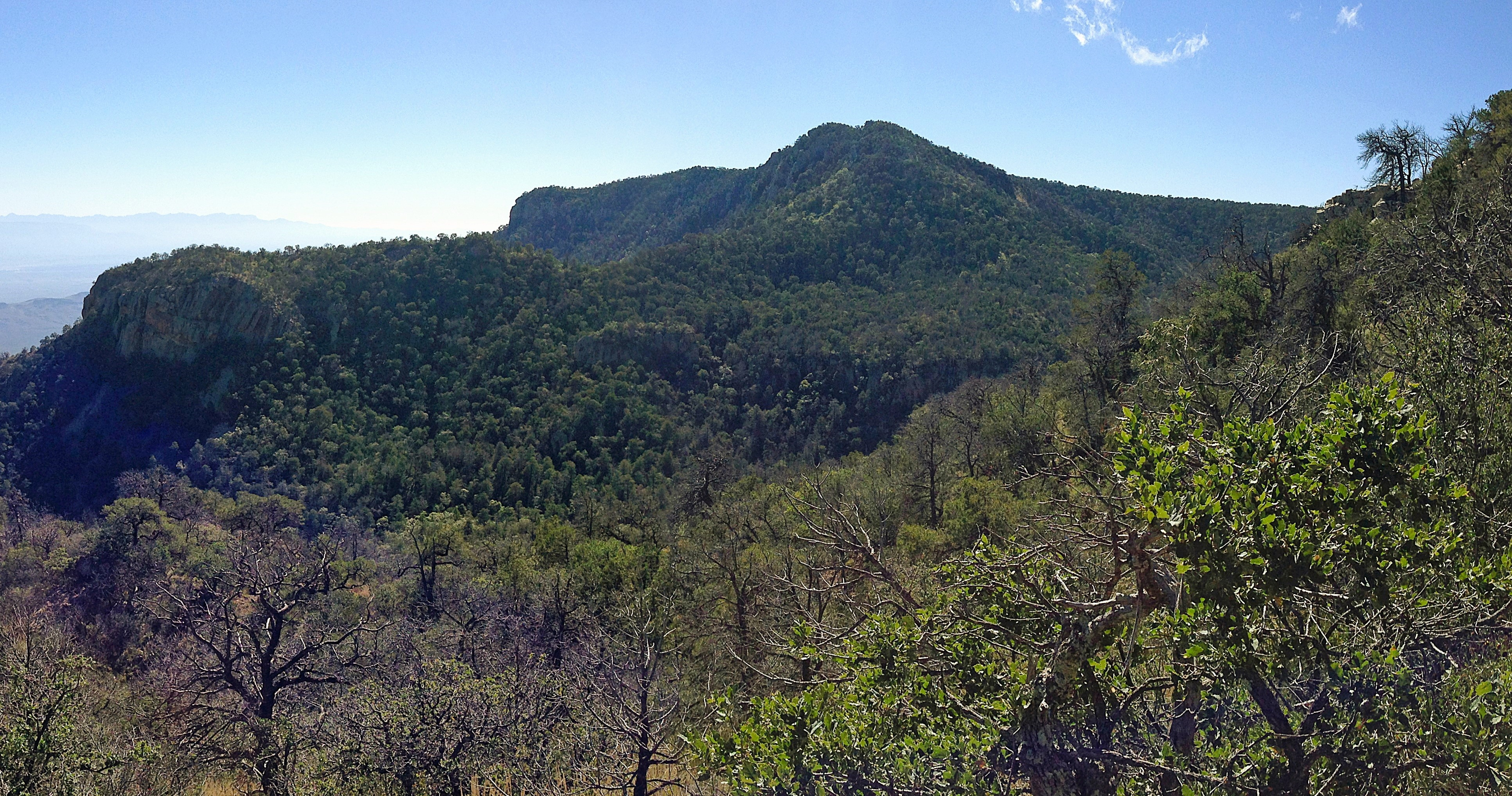
Northwest aspect, from Emory Peak Trail
