= Nugent =

Nugent may refer to:

- Nugent (surname)
- Nugent (album), album by Ted Nugent
- Nugent Mountain, summit in Texas, USA
- Nugent, Tasmania, town in Australia
- Nugent, United States Virgin Islands, village
- Nugents department store (B. Nugent & Brother), St. Louis, MO, USA

== See also ==
- Nugent Sound, British Columbia, Canada
- Lady Nugent (1814 ship), a sailing ship that foundered in 1854

=== Titles under the British crown ===
- Earl Nugent
- Nugent Baronets
