= Nugent Mountain =

Mountain in Texas, United States

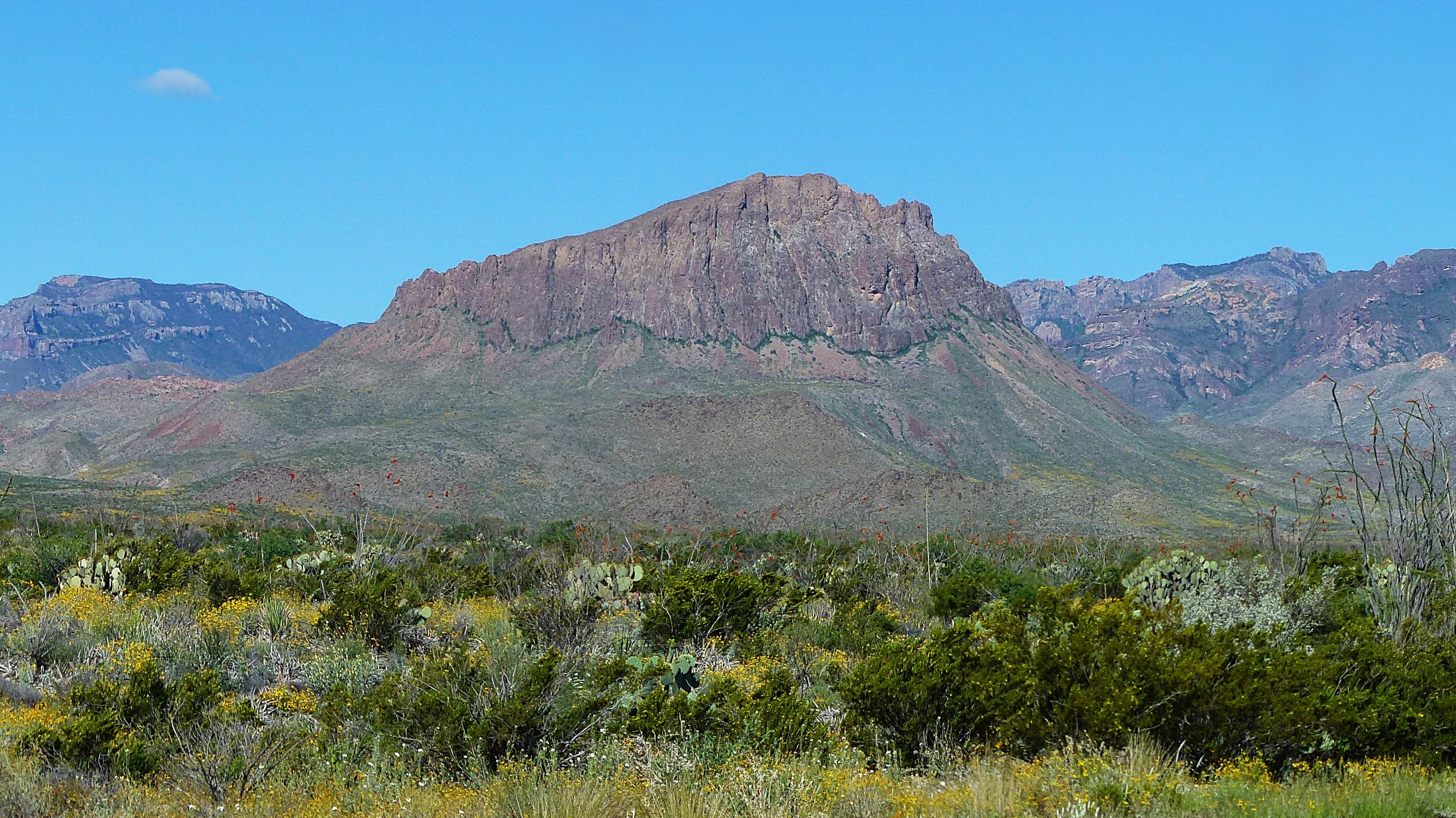
- East aspect

Highest point
- Elevation: 4,778 ft (1,456 m)
- Prominence: 864 ft (263 m)
- Parent peak: Pummel Peak
- Isolation: 3.26 mi (5.25 km)
- Coordinates: 29°15′44″N 103°10′19″W

Geography
- Location within Texas Location within the United States
- Country: United States
- State: Texas
- County: Brewster
- Protected area: Big Bend National Park
- Parent range: Chisos Mountains
- Topo map: USGS Panther Junction

Geology
- Rock age: Oligocene
- Rock type: Intrusive igneous rock

Climbing
- Easiest route: class 2+

Nugent Mountain is a 4,778-foot-elevation (1,456-meter) summit in Brewster County, Texas, United States.

== Description ==
Nugent Mountain is located in Big Bend National Park and the Chisos Mountains. The mountain is composed of intrusive igneous rock which formed during the Oligocene period. Although modest in elevation, topographic relief is significant as the summit rises 1,600 feet (488 m) above the Rio Grande Village Road in one mile (1.6 km). Based on the Köppen climate classification, Nugent Mountain is located in a hot arid climate zone with hot summers and mild winters. Any scant precipitation runoff from the mountain's slopes drains into the Rio Grande watershed. The mountain's toponym has been officially adopted by the United States Board on Geographic Names, and has been reported in publications as early as 1913.

== See also ==
- List of mountain peaks of Texas
- Geography of Texas
