= Pommel =

Pommel may refer to:

- Pommel (saddle), the raised area at the front of an equestrian saddle
- Pommel (sword), the cap at the end of the hilt of a European sword

== See also ==
- Pommel horse, an artistic gymnastics apparatus
- Pummel (disambiguation)
