= Pummel Peak =

Mountain in Texas, United States

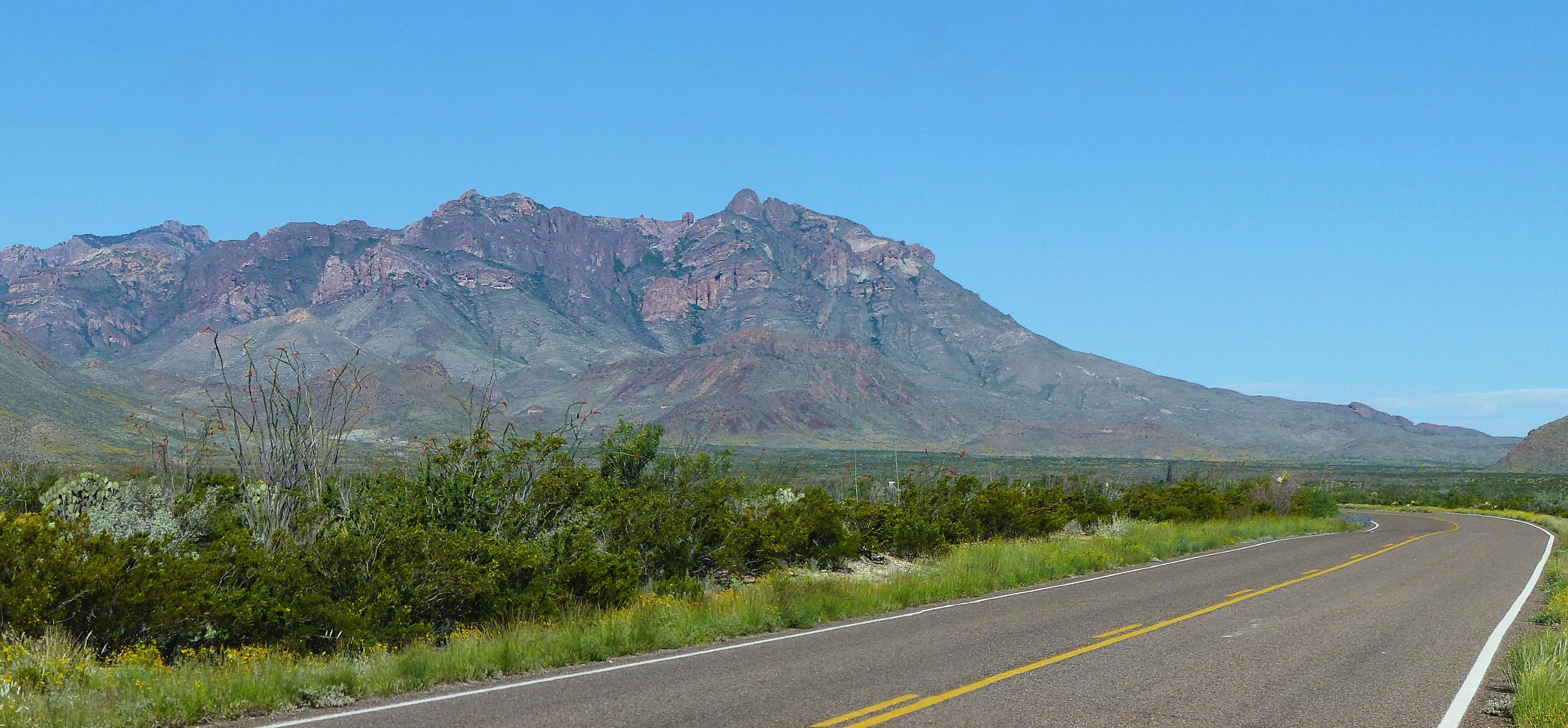
- East aspect

Highest point
- Elevation: 6,639 ft (2,024 m)
- Prominence: 1,141 ft (348 m)
- Parent peak: Lost Mine Peak (7,547 ft)
- Isolation: 2.58 mi (4.15 km)
- Coordinates: 29°17′14″N 103°13′04″W

Naming
- Etymology: pummel

Geography
- Location within Texas Location within the United States
- Country: United States
- State: Texas
- County: Brewster
- Protected area: Big Bend National Park
- Parent range: Chisos Mountains
- Topo map: USGS Panther Junction

Geology
- Rock age: Oligocene
- Rock type: Volcanic rock (rhyolite)

Climbing
- Easiest route: class 4

Pummel Peak is a 6,639-foot-elevation (2,024-meter) summit in Brewster County, Texas, United States.

== Description ==
Pummel Peak is located in Big Bend National Park and the Chisos Mountains. The mountain is composed of volcanic rock which formed during the Oligocene period. Although modest in elevation, topographic relief is significant as the summit rises 3,000 feet (914 m) above the Rio Grande Village Road in two miles (3.2 km). Based on the Köppen climate classification, Pummel Peak is located in a hot arid climate zone with hot summers and mild winters. Any scant precipitation runoff from the mountain's slopes drains into the Rio Grande watershed. The lower slopes of the peak are covered by juniper, oak, and piñon. The mountain's toponym has been officially adopted by the United States Board on Geographic Names. Pummel Peak is so named because the summit's resemblance to the pommel (or pummel) which is the rounded knob or horn of a horse saddle. The landform was spelled as "Pummel Peak" in publications as early as 1912, however it was spelled as "Pommel Peak" in a 1940 publication.

== See also ==
- List of mountain peaks of Texas
- Geography of Texas

== Gallery ==
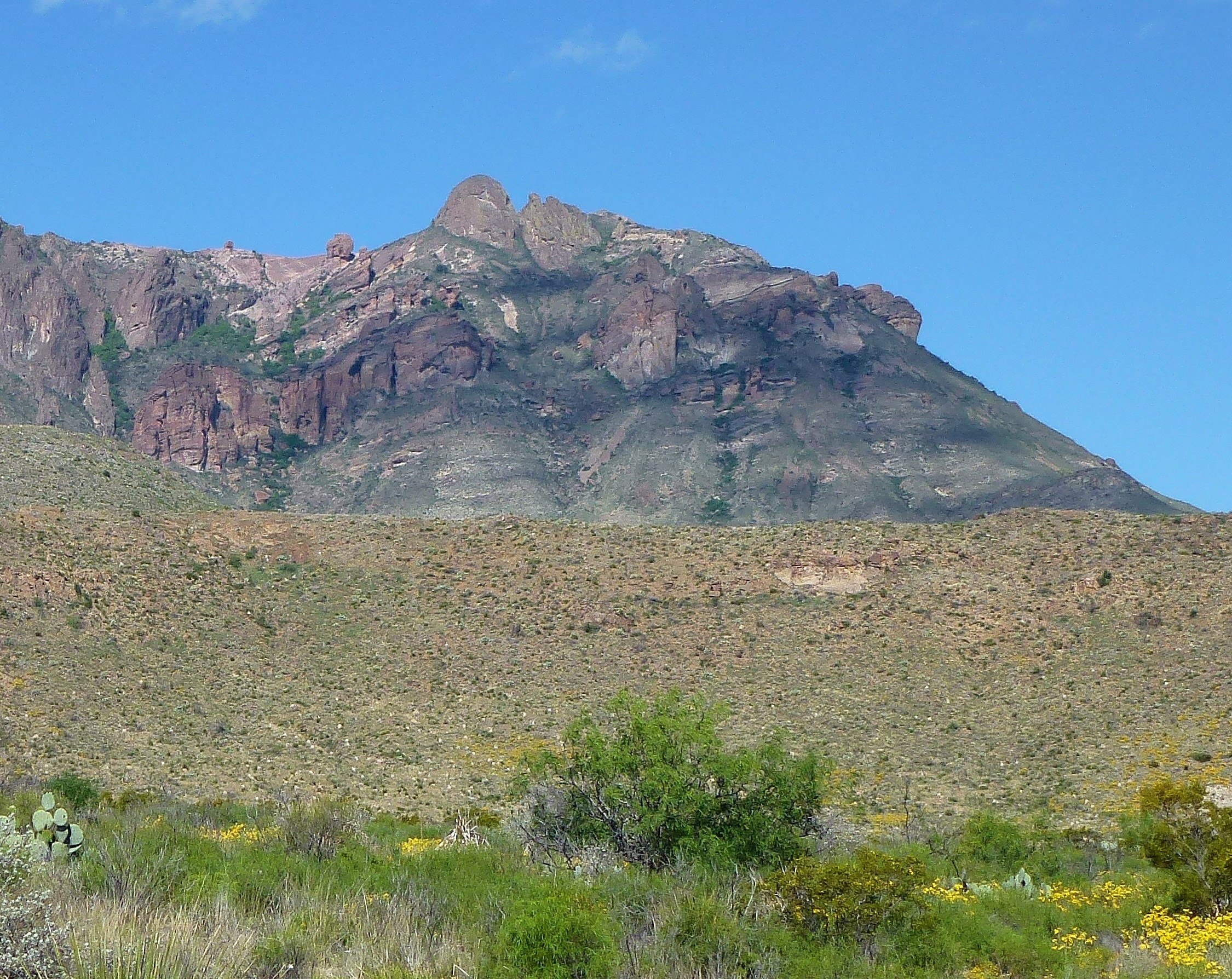
East aspect of summit of Pummel Peak

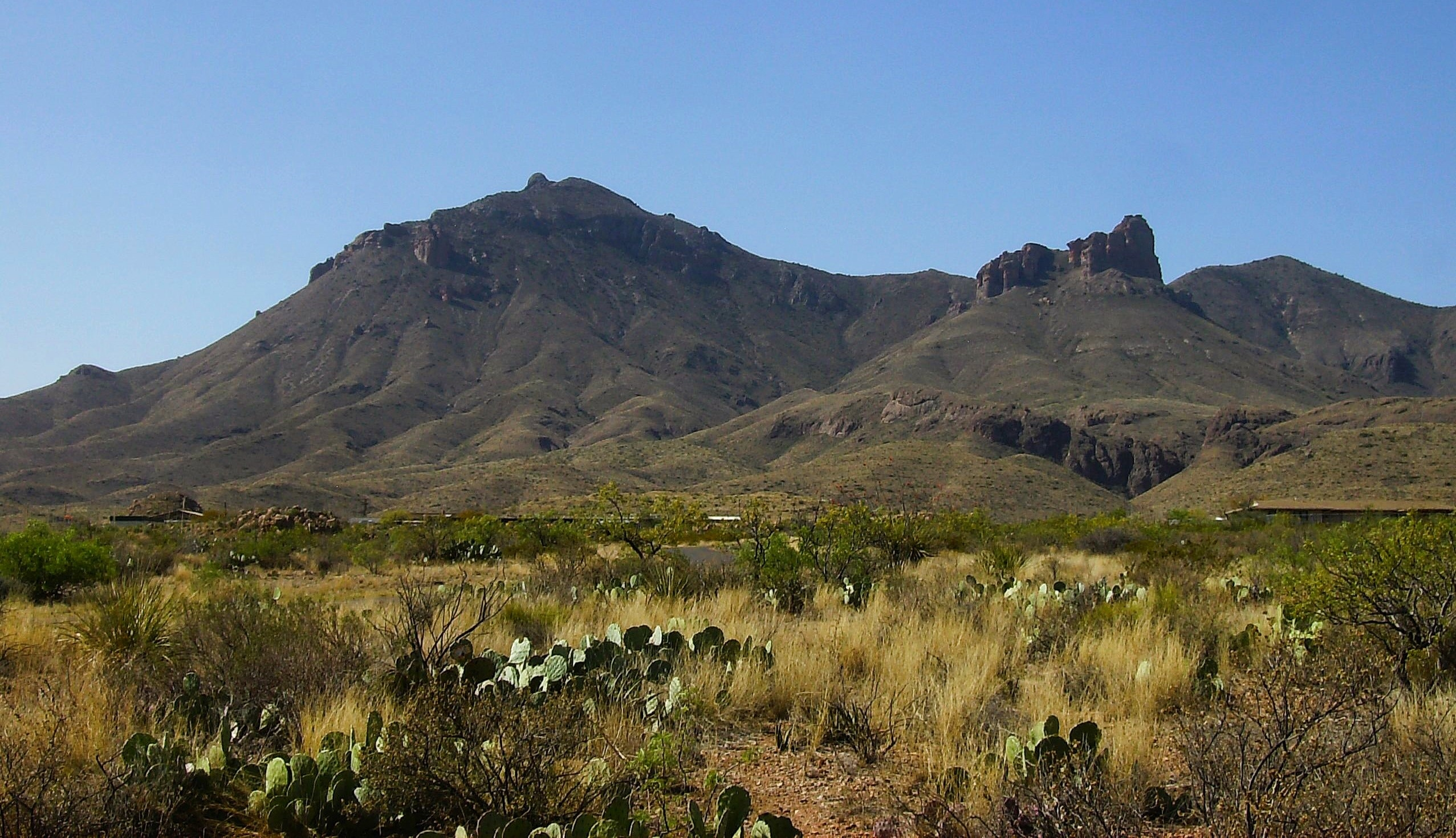
North aspect of Pummel Peak (left) with Wright Mountain to the right
