= Casa Grande Peak =

Mountain in Texas, United States

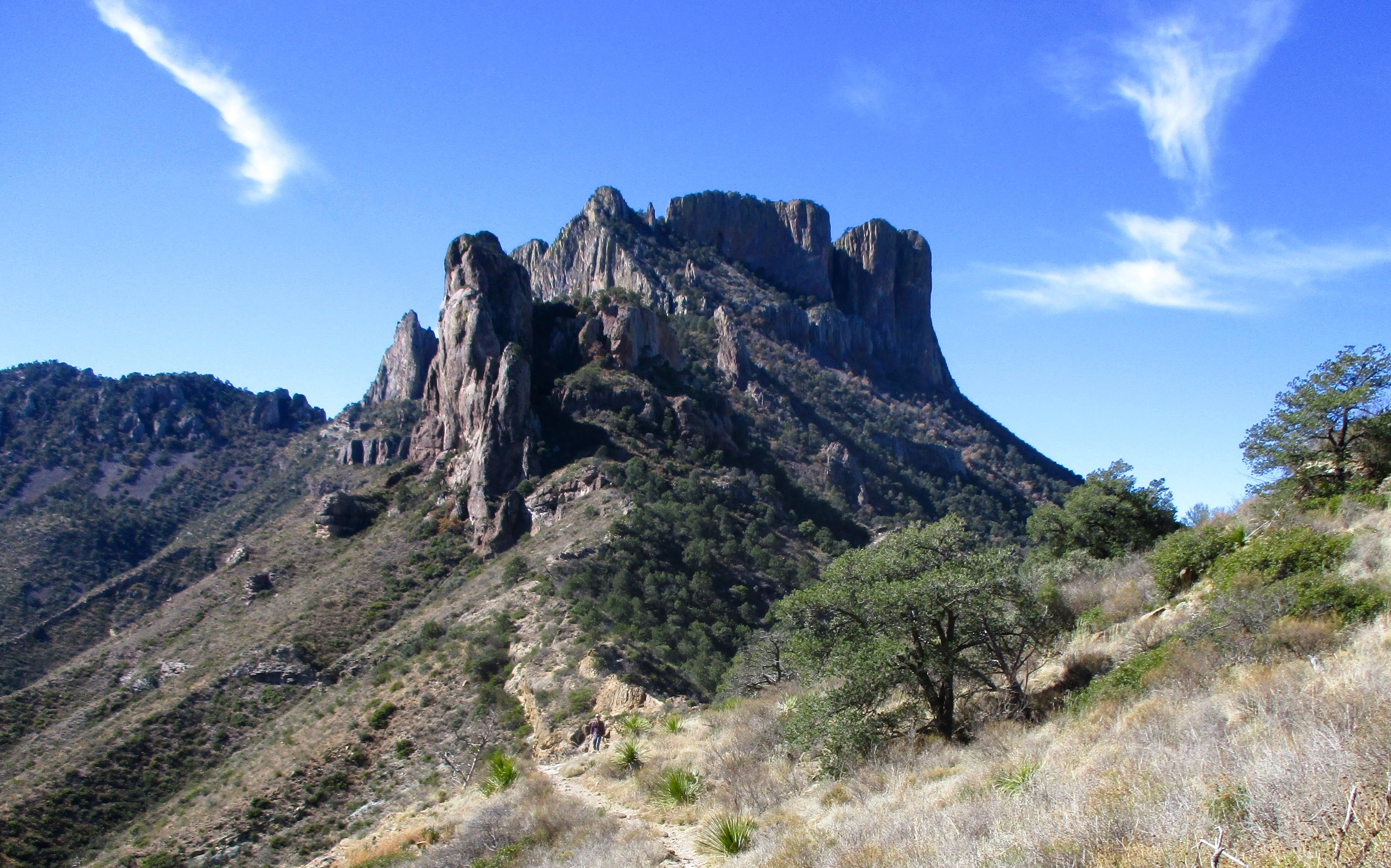
- East aspect

Highest point
- Elevation: 7,325 ft (2,233 m)
- Prominence: 585 ft (178 m)
- Parent peak: Toll Mountain (7,409 ft)
- Isolation: 0.93 mi (1.50 km)
- Coordinates: 29°16′04″N 103°17′14″W

Geography
- Location within Texas Location within the United States
- Country: United States
- State: Texas
- County: Brewster
- Protected area: Big Bend National Park
- Parent range: Chisos Mountains
- Topo map: USGS The Basin

Geology
- Rock age: Eocene
- Mountain type: Lava dome
- Rock type: Rhyolite

Climbing
- Easiest route: class 2 Southwest slope

Casa Grande Peak is a 7,325-foot-elevation (2,233-meter) mountain summit in Brewster County, Texas, United States.

== Description ==
Casa Grande Peak is located in Big Bend National Park and the Chisos Mountains. It ranks as the fifth-highest peak in this park, mountain range, and county, but only the 26th-highest in Texas. The peak is an extra-caldera vent, or volcanic dome, of the Pine Canyon caldera which formed about 32–35 million years ago during a period of volcanic activity. Although modest in elevation, topographic relief is significant as the summit rises 2,000 feet (610 m) above Chisos Basin in less than 1 mile (1.6 km). Based on the Köppen climate classification, Casa Grande Peak is located in a hot arid climate zone with hot summers and mild winters. Any scant precipitation runoff from the mountain's slopes drains into the Rio Grande watershed and the lower slopes of the peak are covered by juniper, oak, and piñon. "Casa Grande" is Spanish for "big house." The mountain is so named because it resembles a large castle, and the toponym was officially adopted in 1939 by the United States Board on Geographic Names.

== See also ==
- List of mountain peaks of Texas
- Geography of Texas

== Gallery ==
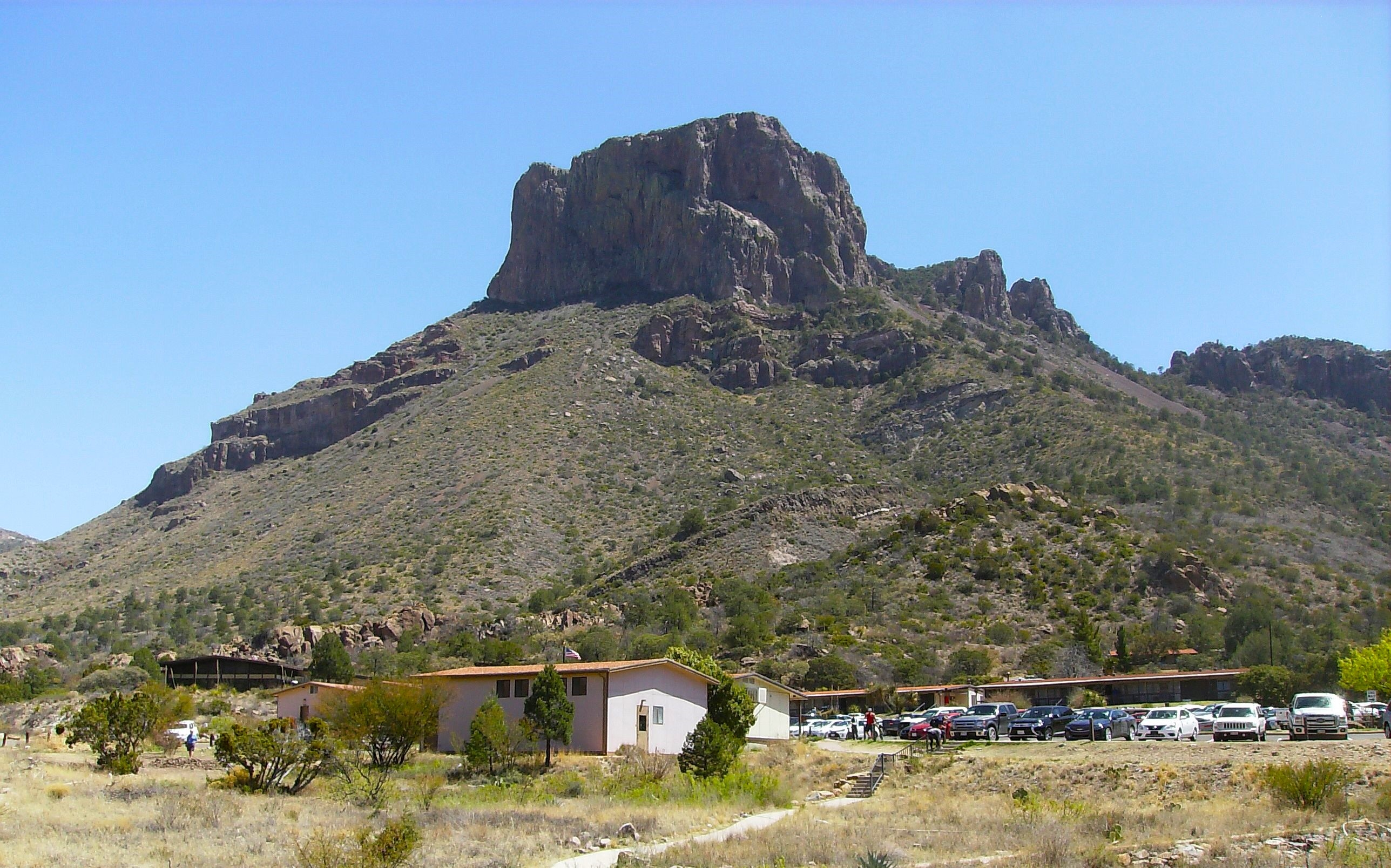
Casa Grande Peak viewed from Chisos Basin Visitors Center

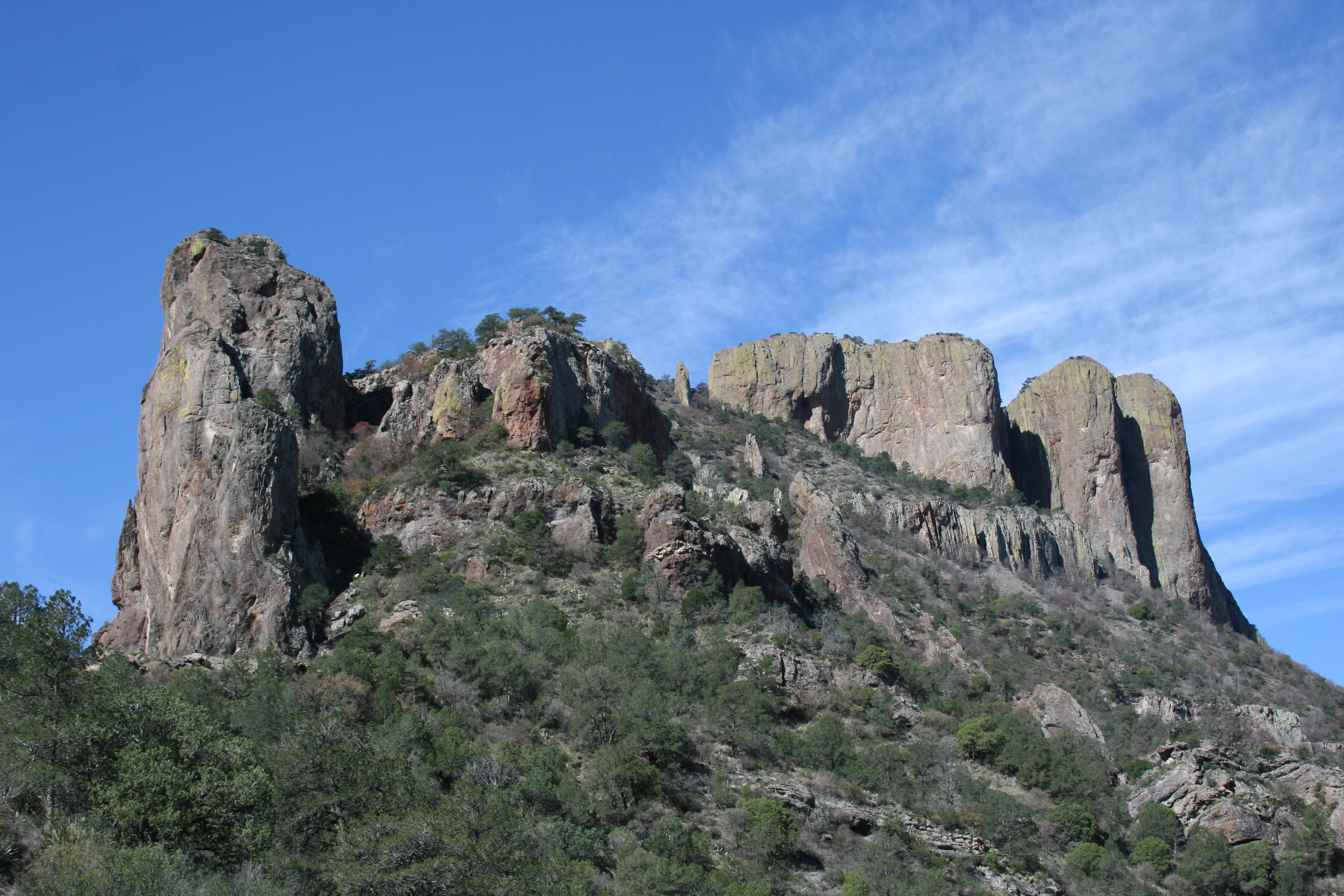

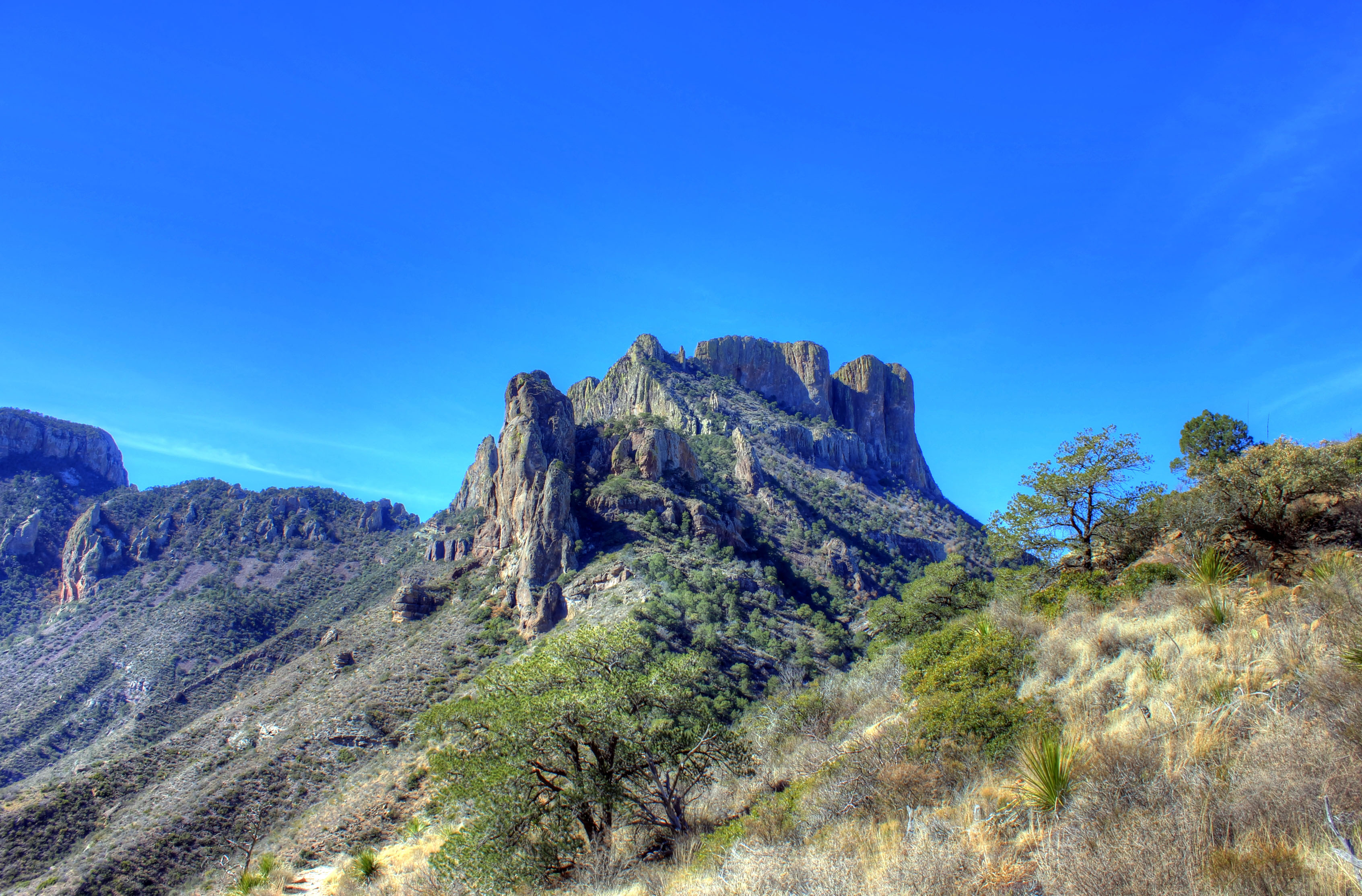

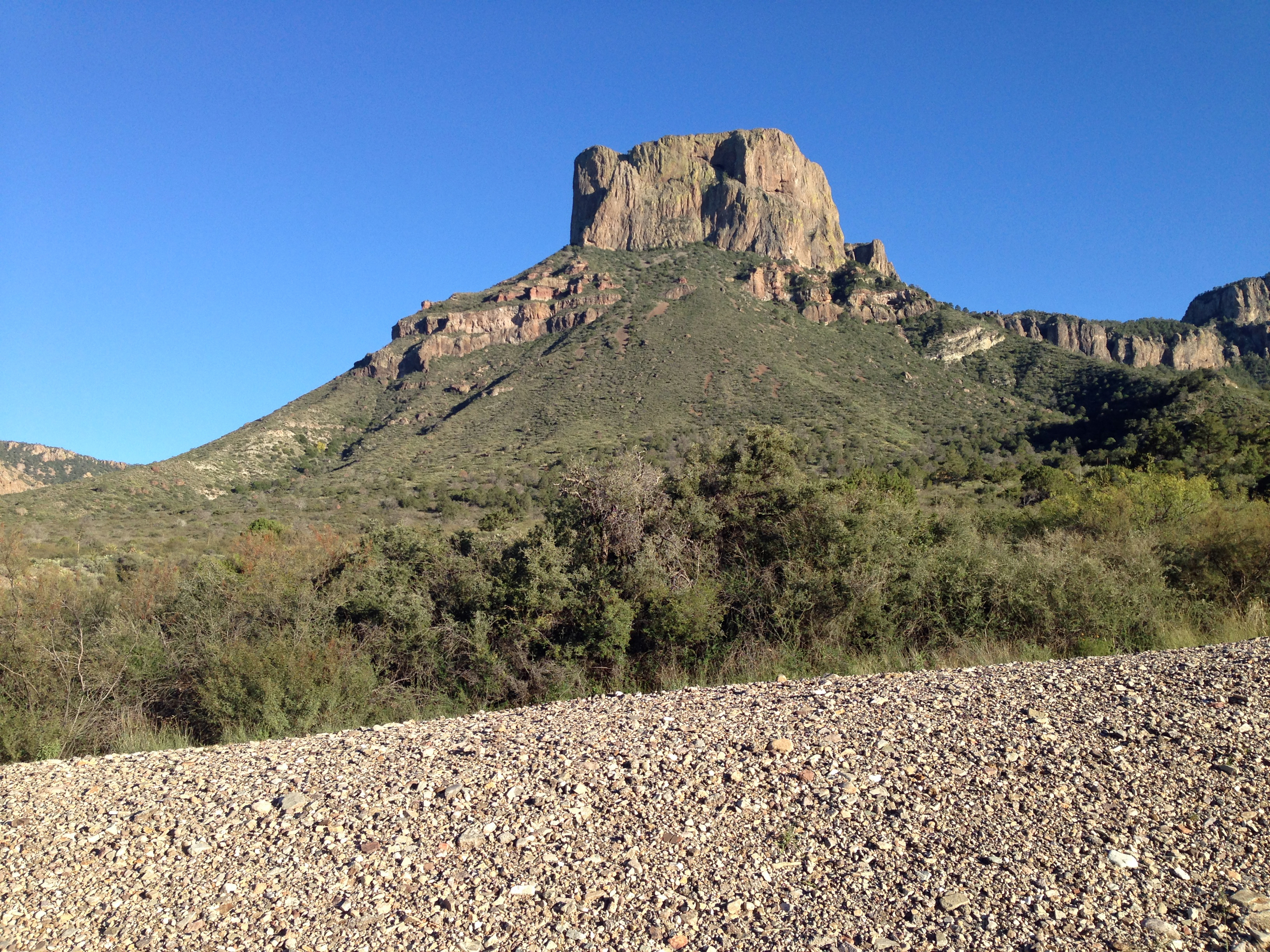
Northwest aspect

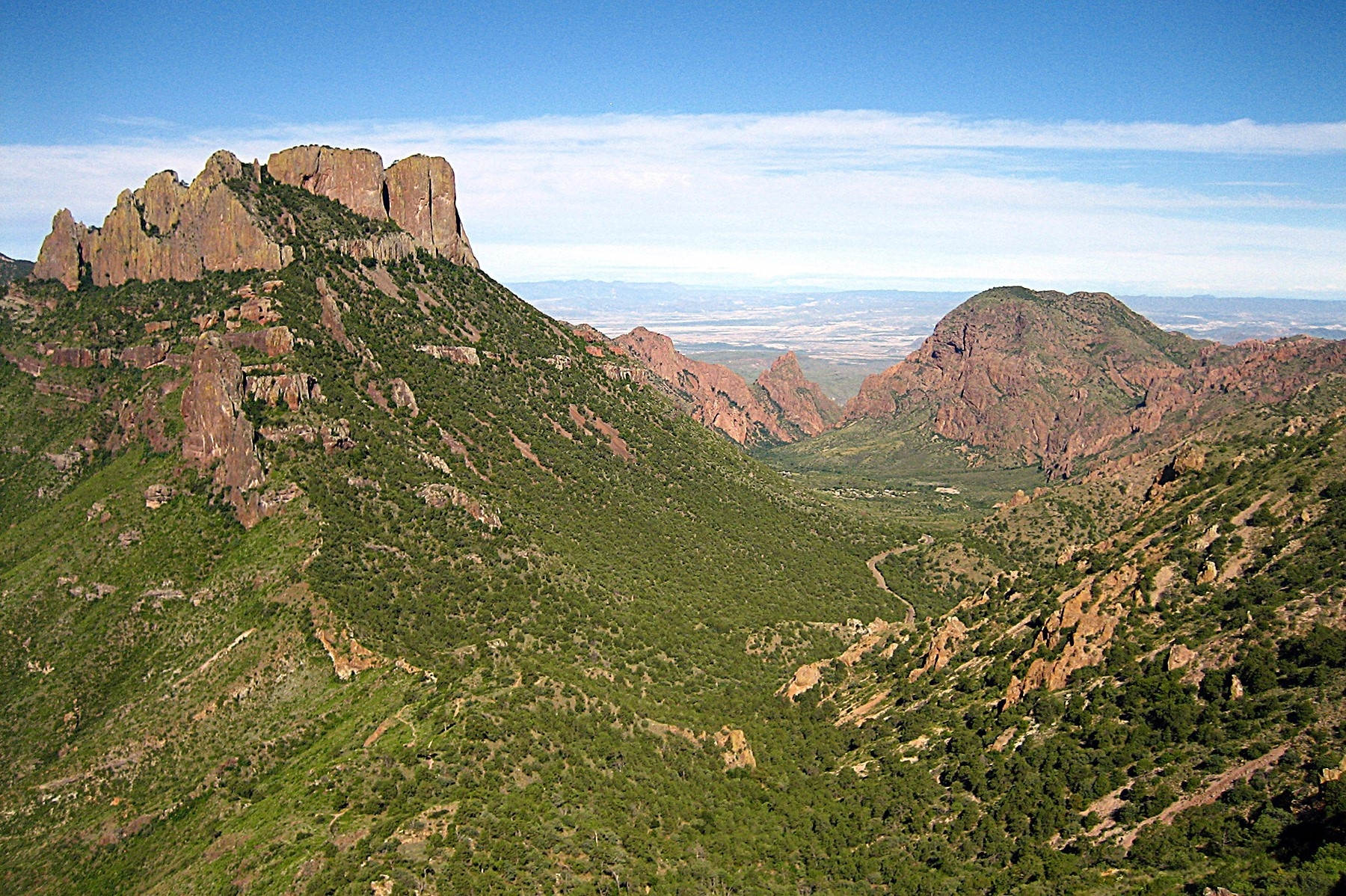
Casa Grande Peak (left) and Vernon Bailey Peak (right)

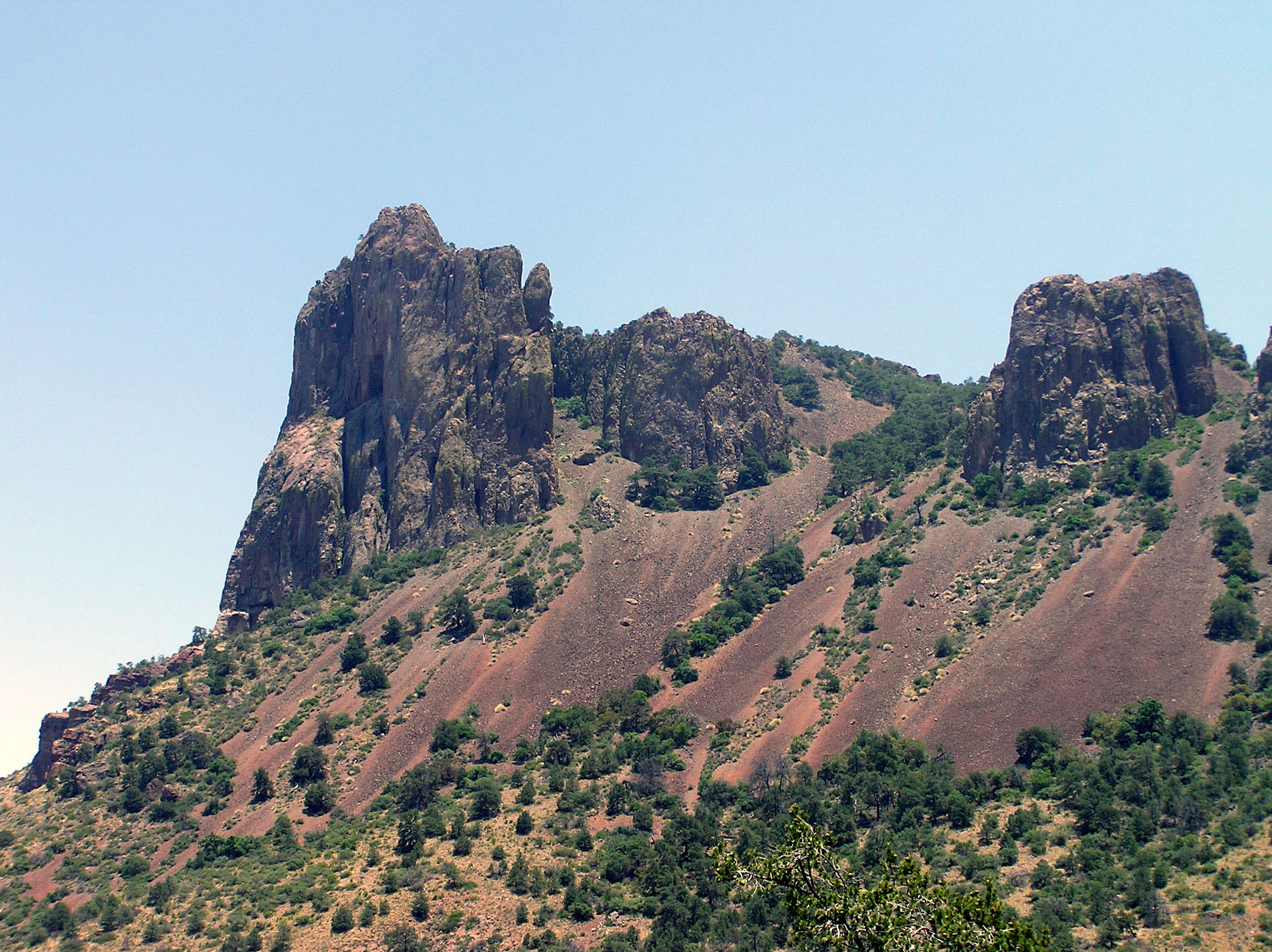
Southwest side of Casa Grande
