= Lost Mine Peak =

Mountain in Texas, United States

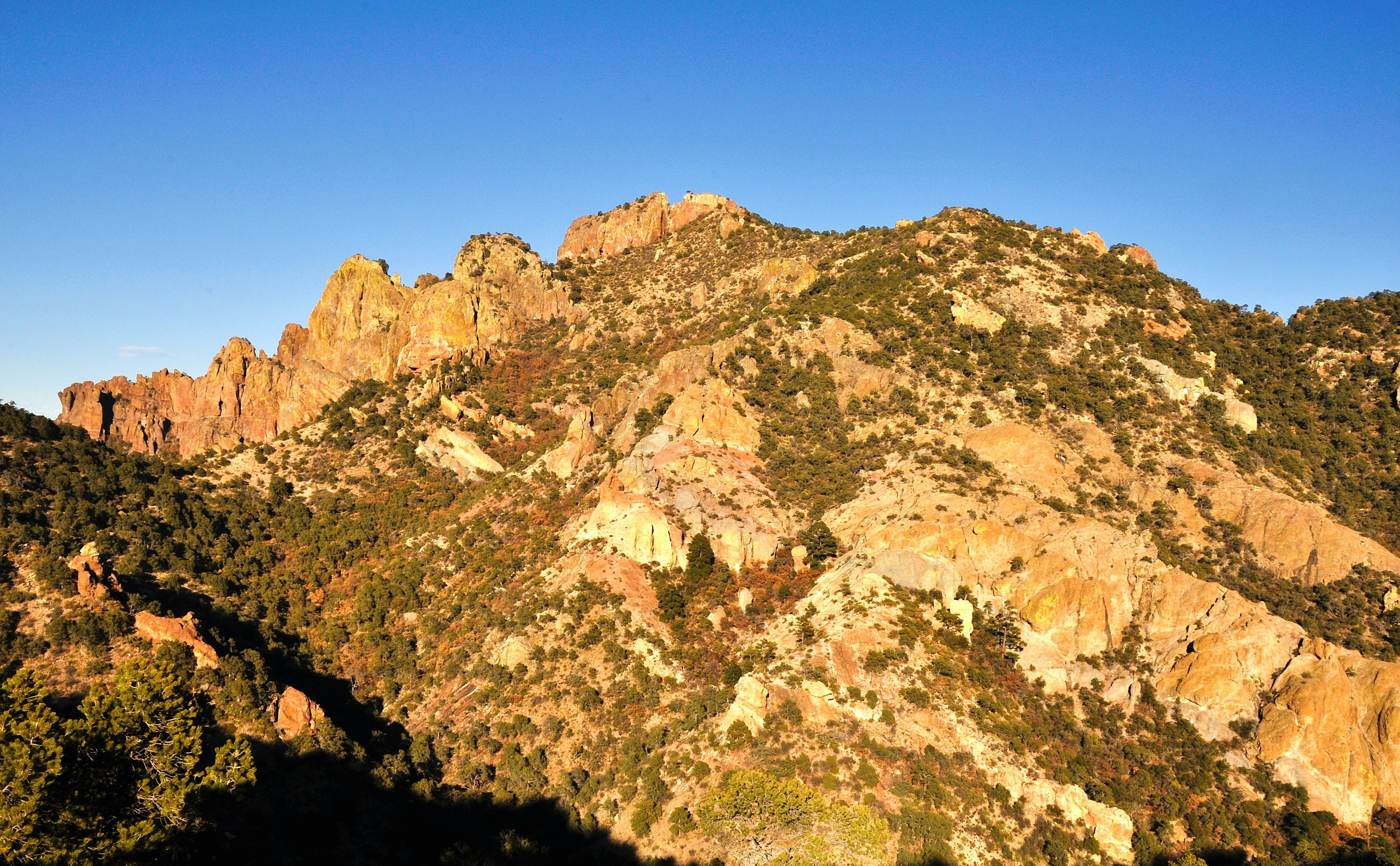
- Southwest aspect, from Lost Mine Trail

Highest point
- Elevation: 7,547 ft (2,300 m)
- Prominence: 1,460 ft (445 m)
- Parent peak: Emory Peak (7,825 ft)
- Isolation: 3.2 mi (5.1 km)
- Coordinates: 29°16′32″N 103°15′30″W

Geography
- Location within Texas Location within the United States
- Country: United States
- State: Texas
- County: Brewster
- Protected area: Big Bend National Park
- Parent range: Chisos Mountains
- Topo map: USGS The Basin

Geology
- Rock age: Oligocene
- Rock type: Volcanic rock (Rhyolite)

Climbing
- Easiest route: class 4

Lost Mine Peak is a 7,547-foot-elevation (2,300-meter) summit in Brewster County, Texas, United States.

== Description ==
Lost Mine Peak is located in Big Bend National Park and the Chisos Mountains. It ranks as the third-highest peak in the park, mountain range, and county, but only the 20th-highest in Texas. The mountain is composed of volcanic rock which formed during the Oligocene period. Although modest in elevation, topographic relief is significant as the summit rises 2,150 feet (655 m) above Pine Canyon in 0.8 miles (1.3 km), and 2,550 feet (777 m) above Juniper Canyon in 1.5 miles (2.4 km). While noted as being modest in elevation all other land areas or peaks east of this point in the U.S. and mainland Canada are lower in elevation. It is the most eastern land area in the U.S. above 7,000 feet. Based on the Köppen climate classification, Lost Mine Peak is located in a hot arid climate zone with hot summers and mild winters. Any scant precipitation runoff from the mountain's slopes drains into the Rio Grande watershed. The lower slopes of the peak are covered by juniper, oak, and piñon. The mountain's toponym has been officially adopted by the United States Board on Geographic Names. The peak's name comes from a legend of Spanish explorers finding silver here and enslaving local people to mine it. According to legend, the workers eventually rebelled, killed their enslavers, then sealed the entrance to prevent further exploitation. The Lost Mine Trail was built in the 1930s by the Civilian Conservation Corps and is the most scenic and popular trail within Big Bend National Park. The trail covers 4.8 miles (round-trip) with 1,000 feet of elevation gain.

== See also ==
- List of mountain peaks of Texas
- Geography of Texas

== Gallery ==
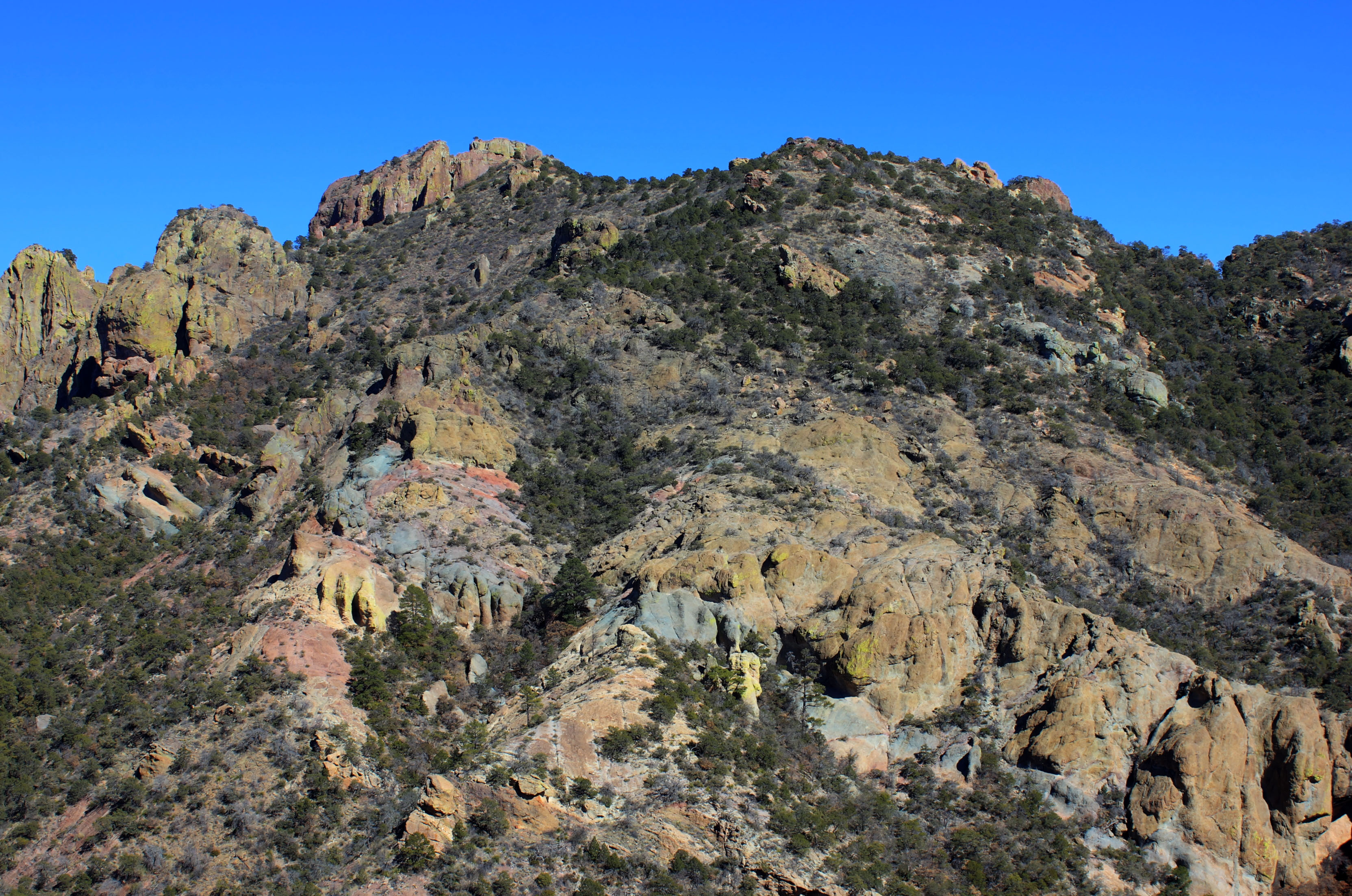
Summit at upper left

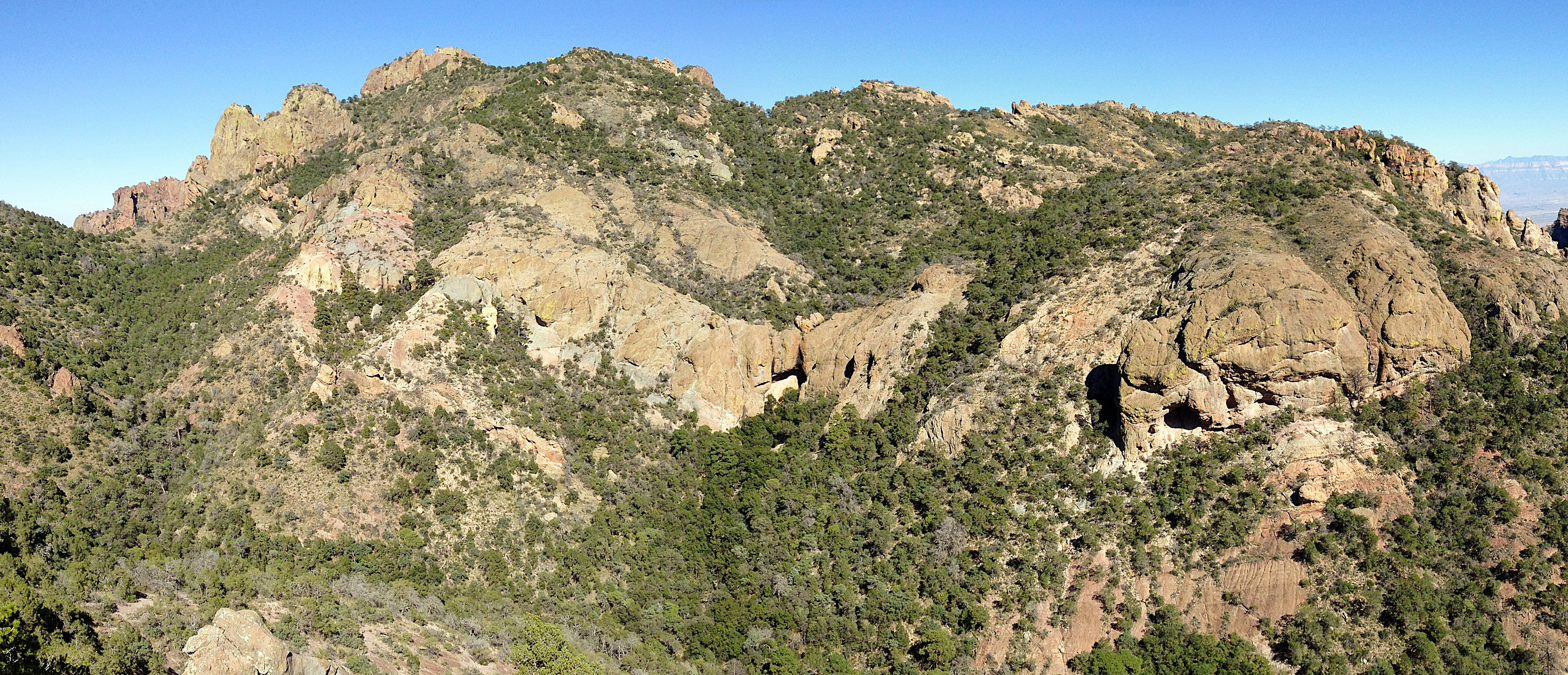
Southwest aspect, from Lost Mine Trail.
Summit to left.

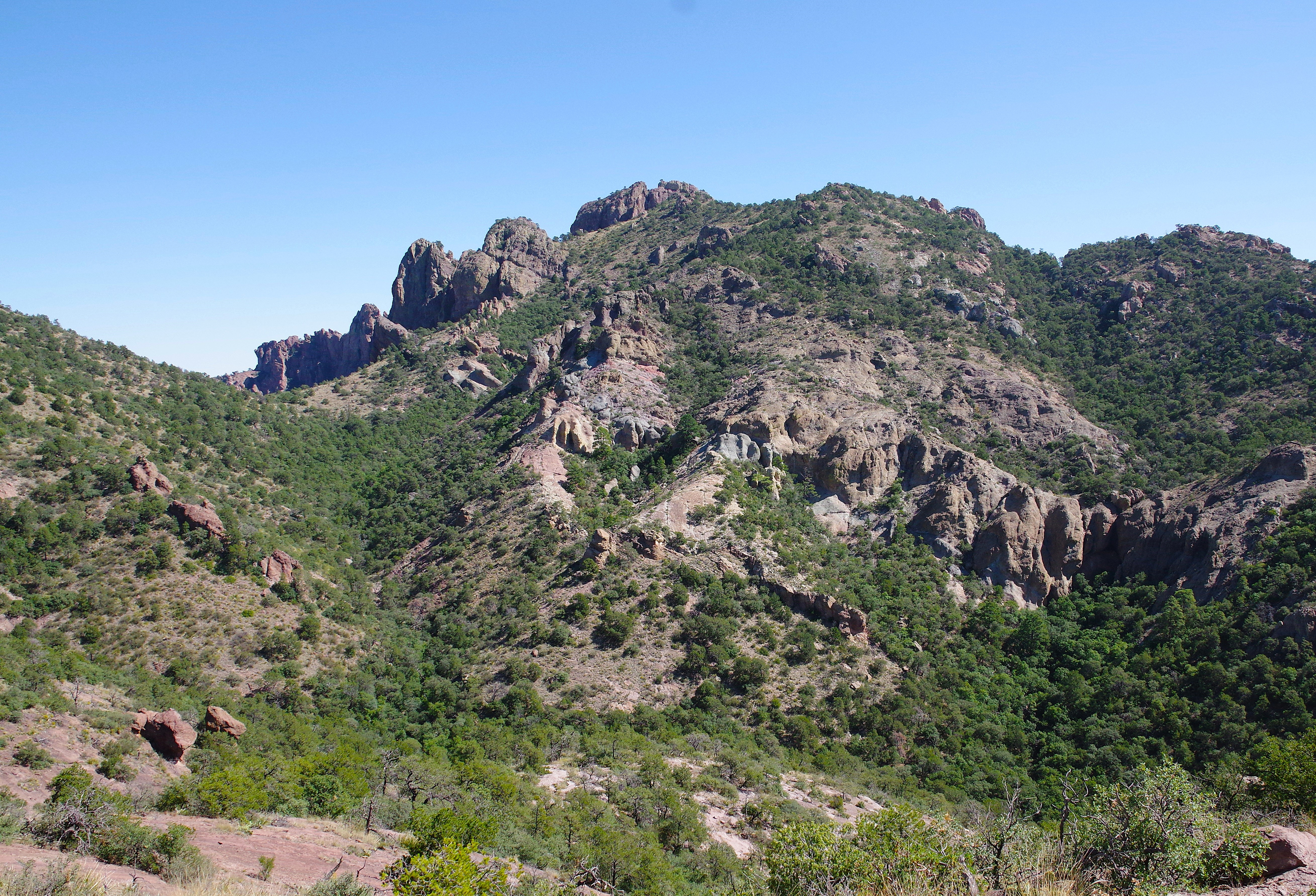

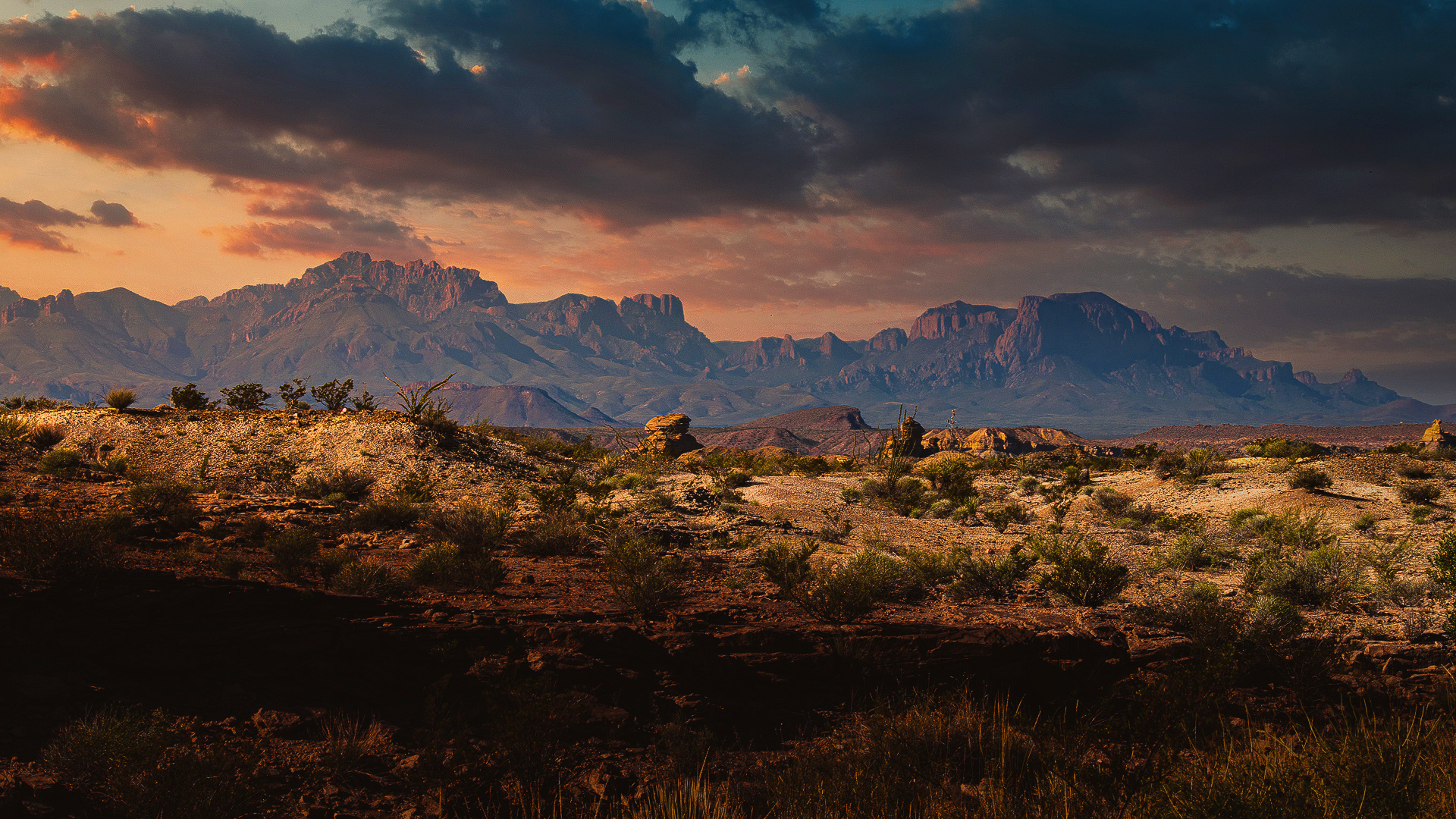
Lost Mine Peak is prominent peak to left. North aspect.

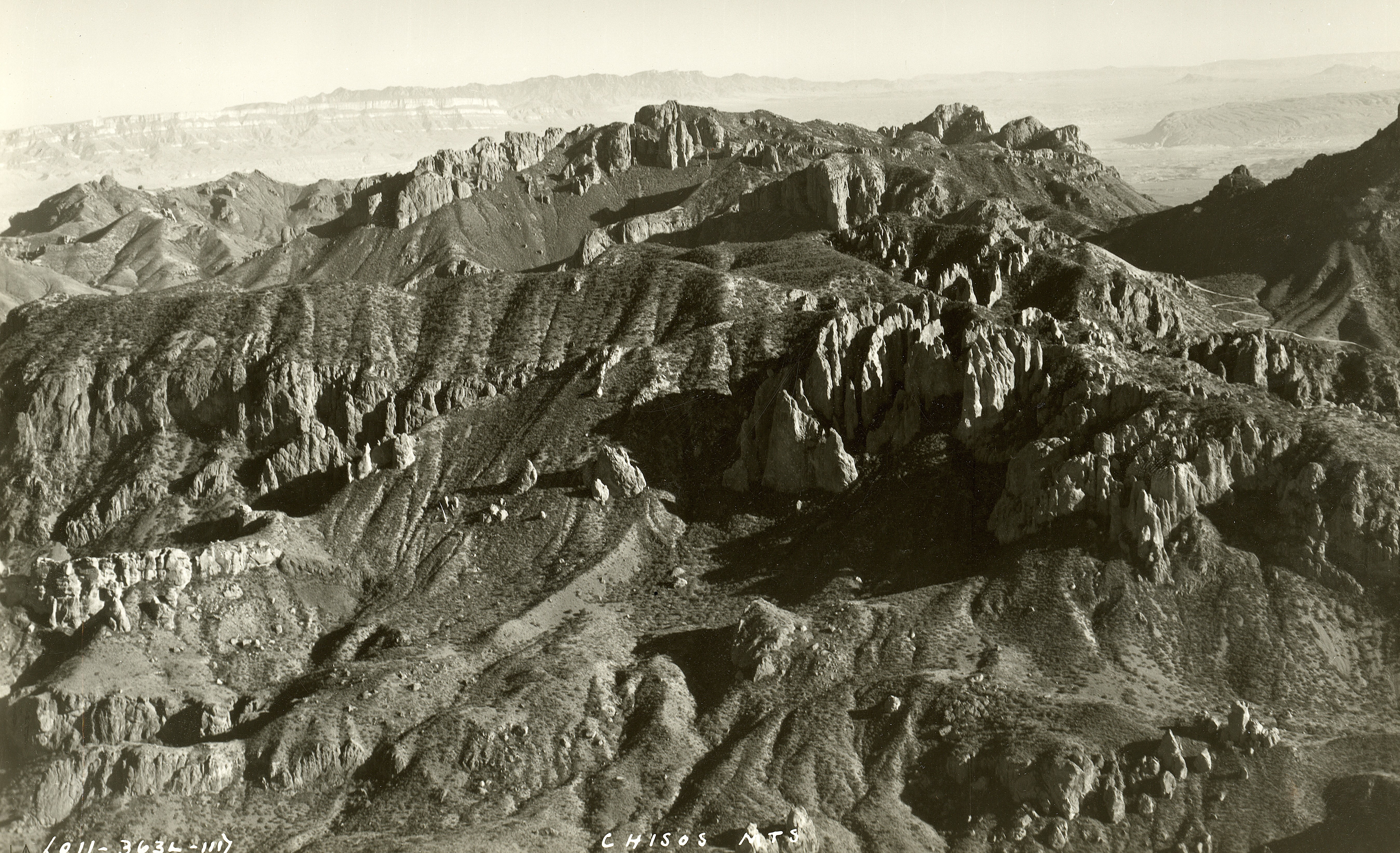
1937 aerial view of Lost Mine Peak centered at top, from WNW.
