= Emory Peak =

Mountain in Texas, United States

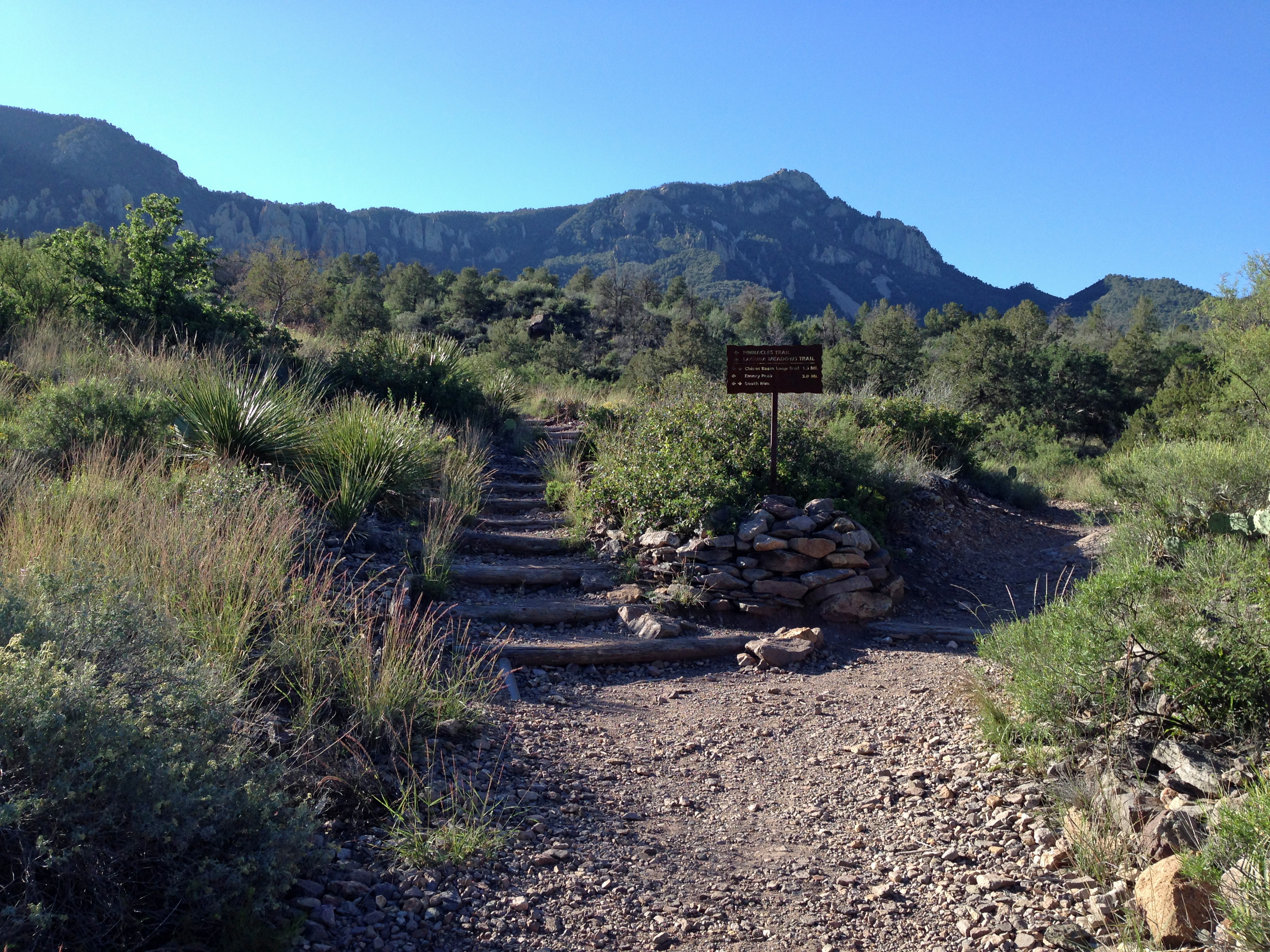
- Emory Peak from the Basin

Highest point
- Elevation: 7,825 ft (2,385 m) NGVD 29
- Prominence: 4,485 ft (1,367 m)
- Listing: Most prominent peak in Texas
- Coordinates: 29°14′45″N 103°18′18″W

Geography
- Location within Texas
- Parent range: Chisos Mountains
- Topo map: USGS Emory Peak

Climbing
- Easiest route: Trail hike and scramble

Emory Peak, located in Big Bend National Park, is the highest peak in the Chisos Mountains and the highest in Brewster County. The peak is named for William H. Emory, the chief surveyor of the U.S. Boundary Survey team of 1852. From the Chisos Basin the peak appears to be a minor ridge, while the summit of Casa Grande, one mile closer, seems to be much taller. From the west, Emory Peak is clearly visible as a point slightly higher than most of the mountain range.

The peak can be reached by a moderate hike on a well-marked path across steep rocky terrain with an elevation gain of approximately 2,500 feet (760 m). The Emory Peak Trail is about 1.5 miles (2.4 km) long. The trail is reached by climbing the Pinnacles Trail 3.5 miles (5.6 km) from the Chisos Basin trailhead. Once at the base there is a semi-technical rock scramble to navigate before reaching the summit. No gear is needed for this climb although hikers should take great care. High-desert flora and fauna including alligator juniper (Juniperus deppeana), pinyon pine (Pinus cembroides), mule deer (Odocoileus hemionus), prickly pear cacti (Opuntia spp.), Mexican jay (Aphelocoma wollweberi), sotol (Dasylirion leiophyllum), and Texas madrone (Arbutus xalapensis) may be seen along the trail. There are signs warning of mountain lions and bears.

The view from the top takes in most of the northern section of the park and a good portion of the Chisos range to the south. One surprise at the top, during the right season, is the population of ladybugs on the summit. There are solar panels, radio transmission equipment, and antennas at the top.

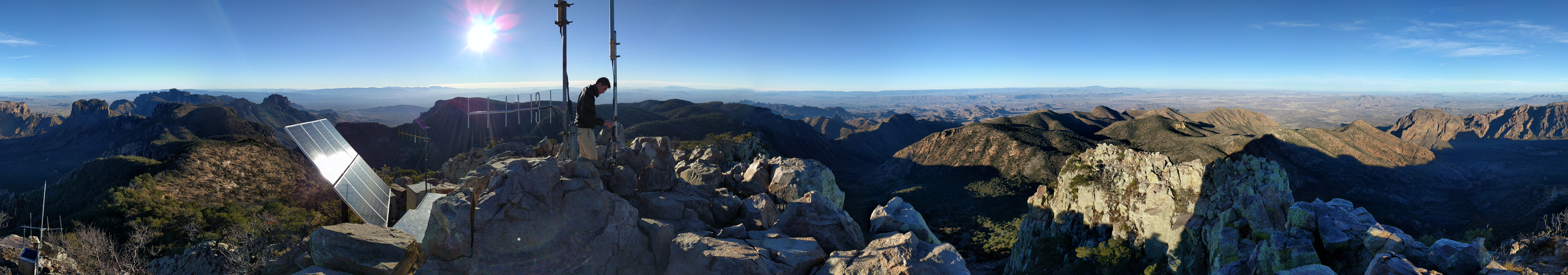
Panoramic view from the summit of Emory Peak
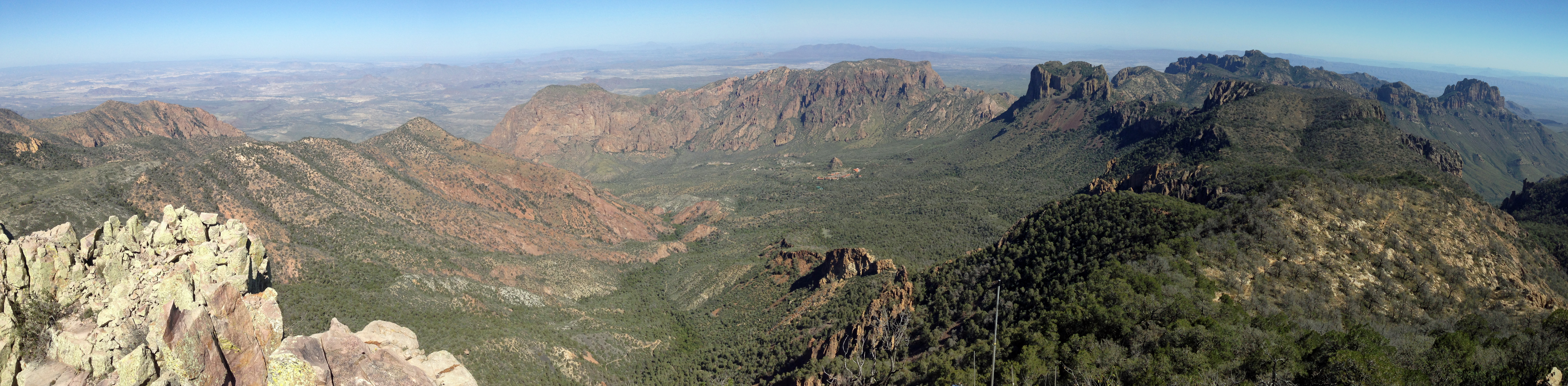
The Basin from the summit

== See also ==
- Chihuahuan Desert
- Guadalupe Peak
