= Chisos Mountains =

Mountain range in Texas, United States

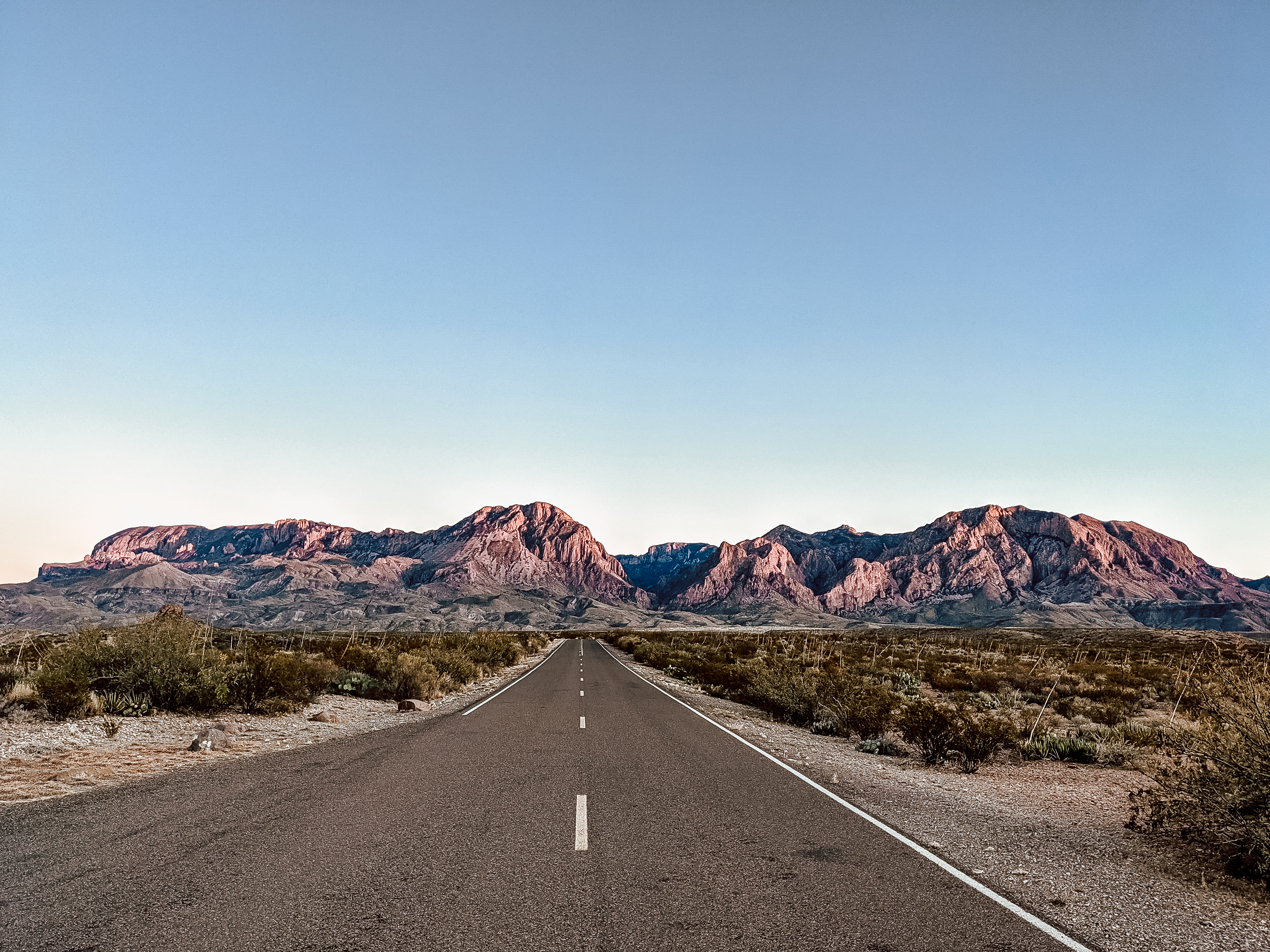
- The Chisos Mountains as photographed facing southeast

Highest point
- Peak: Emory Peak
- Elevation: 7,825 ft (2,385 m)
- Coordinates: 29°14′45″N 103°18′14″W

Geography
- Location within Texas
- Country: United States
- State: Texas
- Range coordinates: 29°16′N 103°18′W

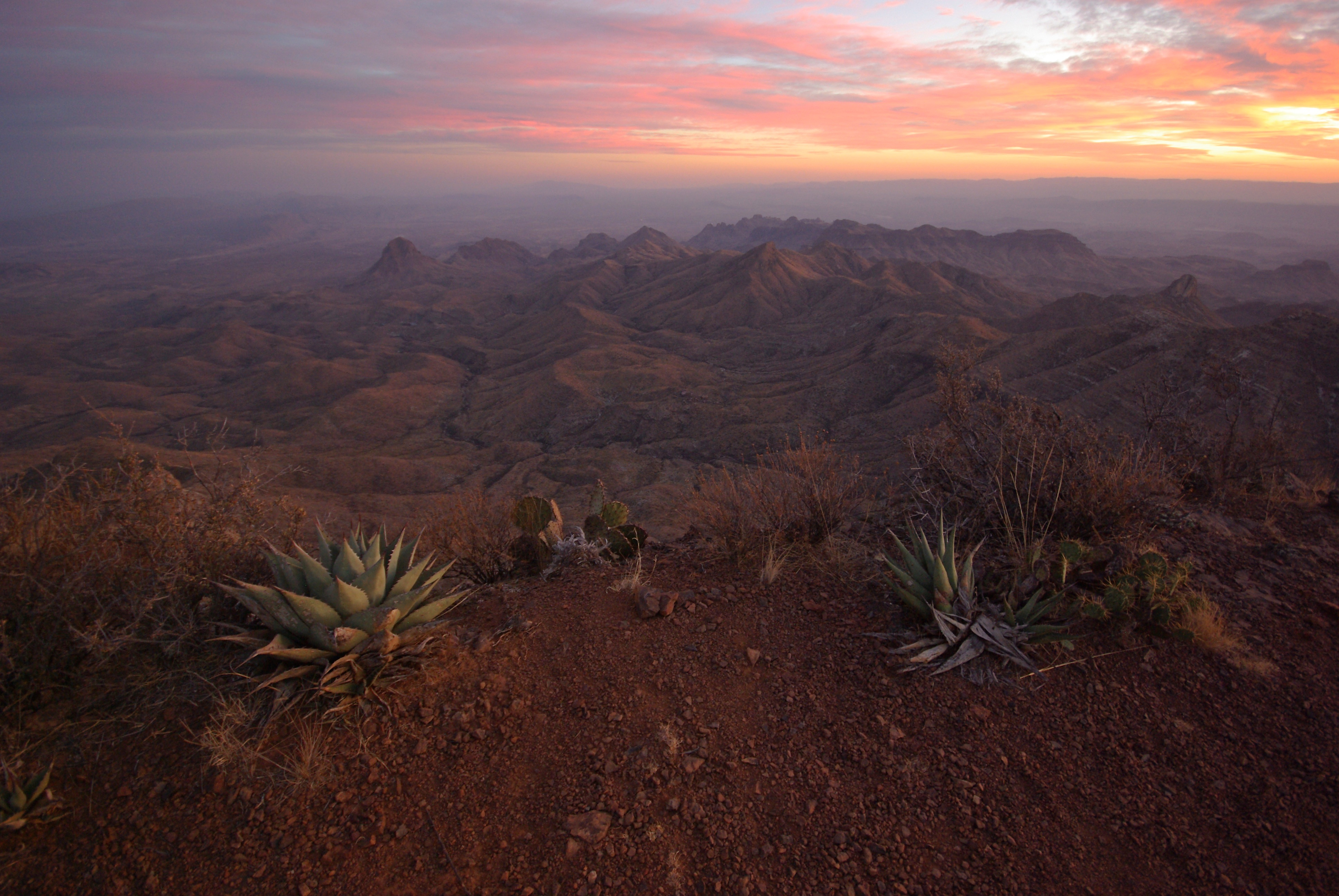
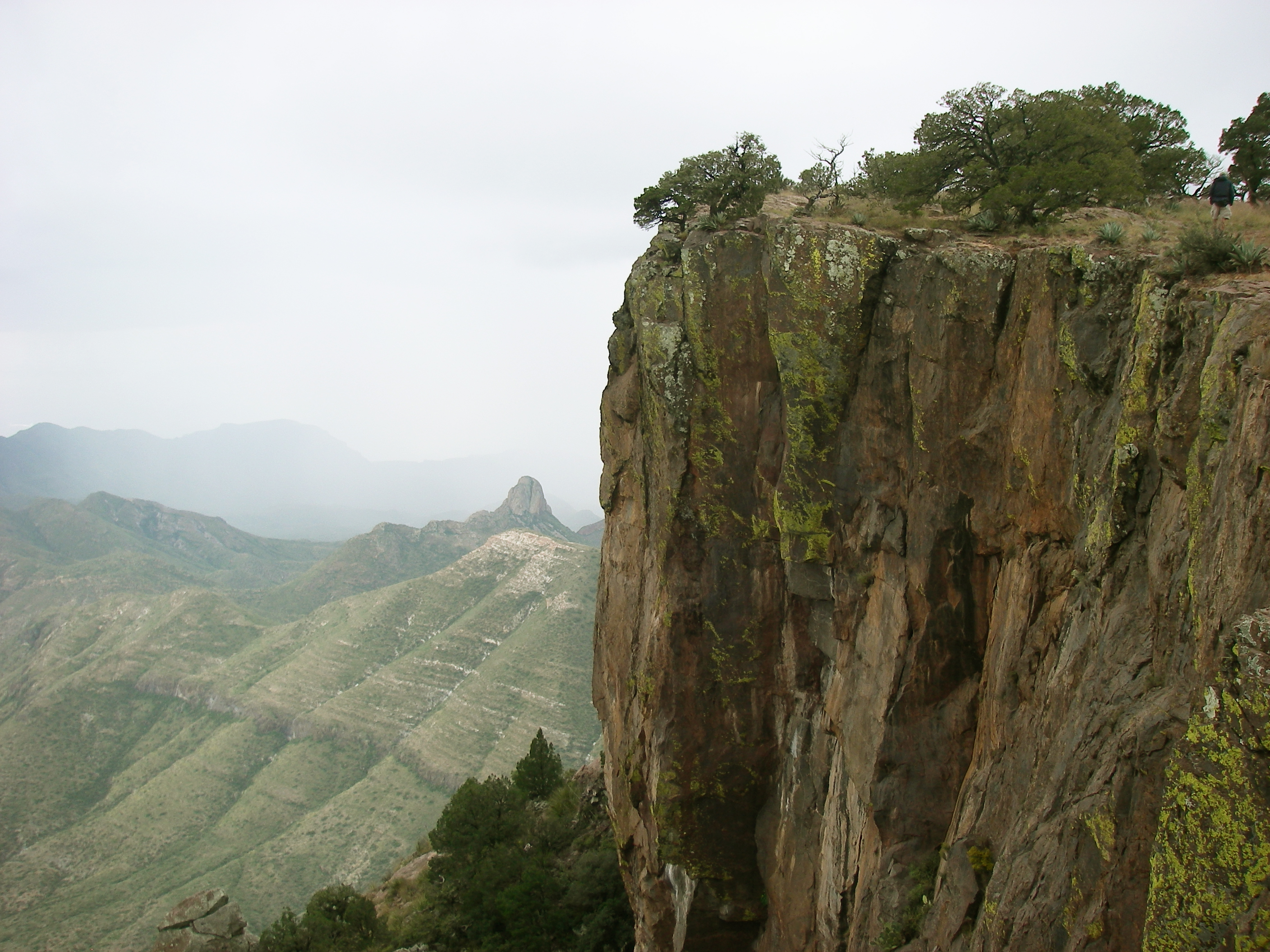
South rim sunset (left) and approaching rain (right)

The Chisos Mountains, also known as the Chisos, are a mountain range located in the Big Bend area of the Trans-Pecos region of Texas, United States. The mountain system covers 40 square miles (104 square km) and is contained entirely within the boundaries of Big Bend National Park, making it the only mountain range in the United States fully contained within a national park. The Chisos Mountains are the southernmost mountain range in the mainland United States.

The Chisos Mountains were created by volcanic activity during the Eocene Epoch 35–44 million years ago.

The highest point in the Chisos Mountain range is Emory Peak at 7,825 ft (2,385 m) above sea level.

== Location ==
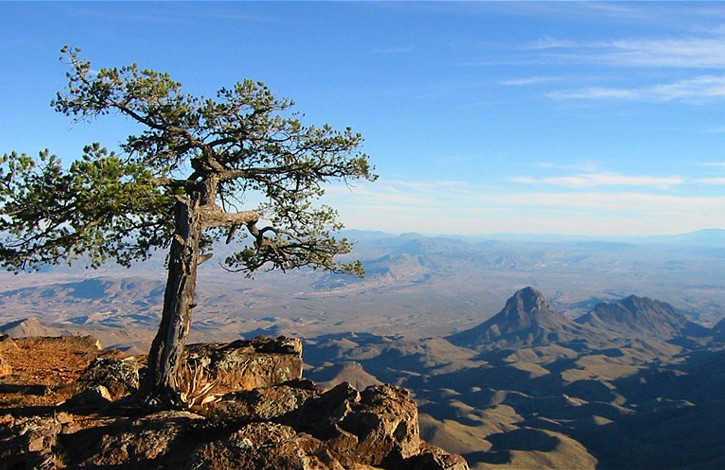
View from the South Rim.

The Chisos Mountains are located in Big Bend National Park. The range of mountains extends twenty miles from Punta de la Sierra in the southwest to Panther Junction in the northeast. An extensive trail system and permit-required backcountry campsites are maintained by Big Bend National Park for its visitors. The Northeast Rim and Southeast Rim trails are closed from February 1 through May 31 along with some of the backcountry campsites along these trails to protect the local peregrine falcon population.

The mountain area is partly forested (recovering from logging and overgrazing prior to the area's inclusion in the National Park System in the 1930s), and surrounded by the Chihuahuan Desert. The nearby towns include Lajitas, Study Butte, Terlingua, Fort Stockton, 135 miles north, Alpine, 105 mi (169 km) northwest and Presidio, about 100 mi (160 km) west. Two Mexican towns (Boquillas and Santa Elena) border the park; and cross-border access was reopened in 2011.

== Etymology ==
One of the multiple possibilities of the origin of the name is the option that it stems from hechizos, a Castilian word meaning "enchantment". Another possibility is that the word originated from chisos, a Native American word meaning "ghost" or "spirit".

== Peaks ==
- Emory Peak 7,835 ft (2,388 m)
- Townsend Point 7,574 ft (2,309 m)
- Lost Mine Peak 7,535 ft (2,297 m)
- Toll Mountain 7,415 ft (2,260 m)
- Casa Grande Peak 7,325 ft (2,233 m)

== Climate ==
- Elevation: 5,300 feet (1,615 m)

Climate data for Chisos Basin, Texas (Aug 1, 1943–Mar 31, 2013)
Month	Jan	Feb	Mar	Apr	May	Jun	Jul	Aug	Sep	Oct	Nov	Dec	Year
Record high °F (°C)	82 (28)	84 (29)	96 (36)	96 (36)	99 (37)	103 (39)	102 (39)	99 (37)	97 (36)	94 (34)	89 (32)	87 (31)	103 (39)
Mean daily maximum °F (°C)	58.3 (14.6)	61.8 (16.6)	68.7 (20.4)	76.3 (24.6)	82.8 (28.2)	86.8 (30.4)	84.8 (29.3)	83.7 (28.7)	79.5 (26.4)	73.8 (23.2)	65.2 (18.4)	59.4 (15.2)	73.4 (23.0)
Daily mean °F (°C)	47.6 (8.7)	50.4 (10.2)	56.4 (13.6)	63.9 (17.7)	70.7 (21.5)	75.1 (23.9)	74.2 (23.4)	73.2 (22.9)	69.0 (20.6)	62.9 (17.2)	54.2 (12.3)	48.7 (9.3)	62.2 (16.8)
Mean daily minimum °F (°C)	36.9 (2.7)	39.1 (3.9)	44.1 (6.7)	51.5 (10.8)	58.5 (14.7)	63.3 (17.4)	63.7 (17.6)	62.7 (17.1)	58.6 (14.8)	51.9 (11.1)	43.2 (6.2)	37.9 (3.3)	51.0 (10.6)
Record low °F (°C)	−3 (−19)	1 (−17)	12 (−11)	25 (−4)	37 (3)	45 (7)	53 (12)	52 (11)	34 (1)	19 (−7)	13 (−11)	4 (−16)	−3 (−19)
Average precipitation inches (mm)	0.68 (17)	0.58 (15)	0.41 (10)	0.62 (16)	1.59 (40)	2.21 (56)	3.39 (86)	3.12 (79)	2.48 (63)	1.51 (38)	0.57 (14)	0.51 (13)	17.67 (449)
Average snowfall inches (cm)	0.8 (2.0)	0.5 (1.3)	0.1 (0.25)	0.0 (0.0)	0.0 (0.0)	0.0 (0.0)	0.0 (0.0)	0.0 (0.0)	0.0 (0.0)	0.0 (0.0)	0.4 (1.0)	0.3 (0.76)	2.1 (5.3)
Average precipitation days (≥ 0.001 in)	3.59	2.99	2.22	2.74	4.51	7.30	9.60	8.88	7.64	4.77	2.90	2.83	60.19
Source: Western Regional Climate Center, Desert Research Institute

== Wildlife ==
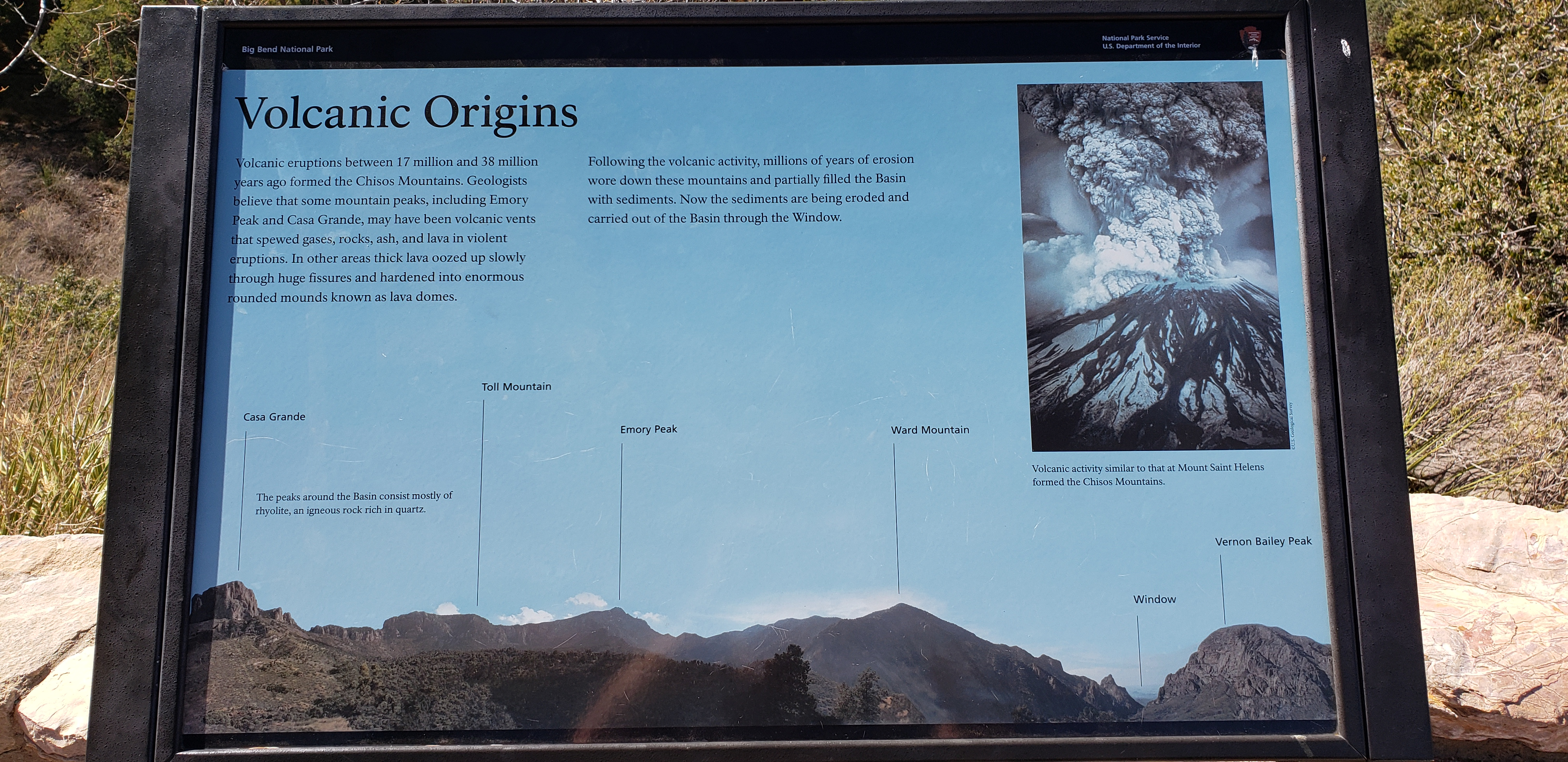
Geology of Chisos Basin

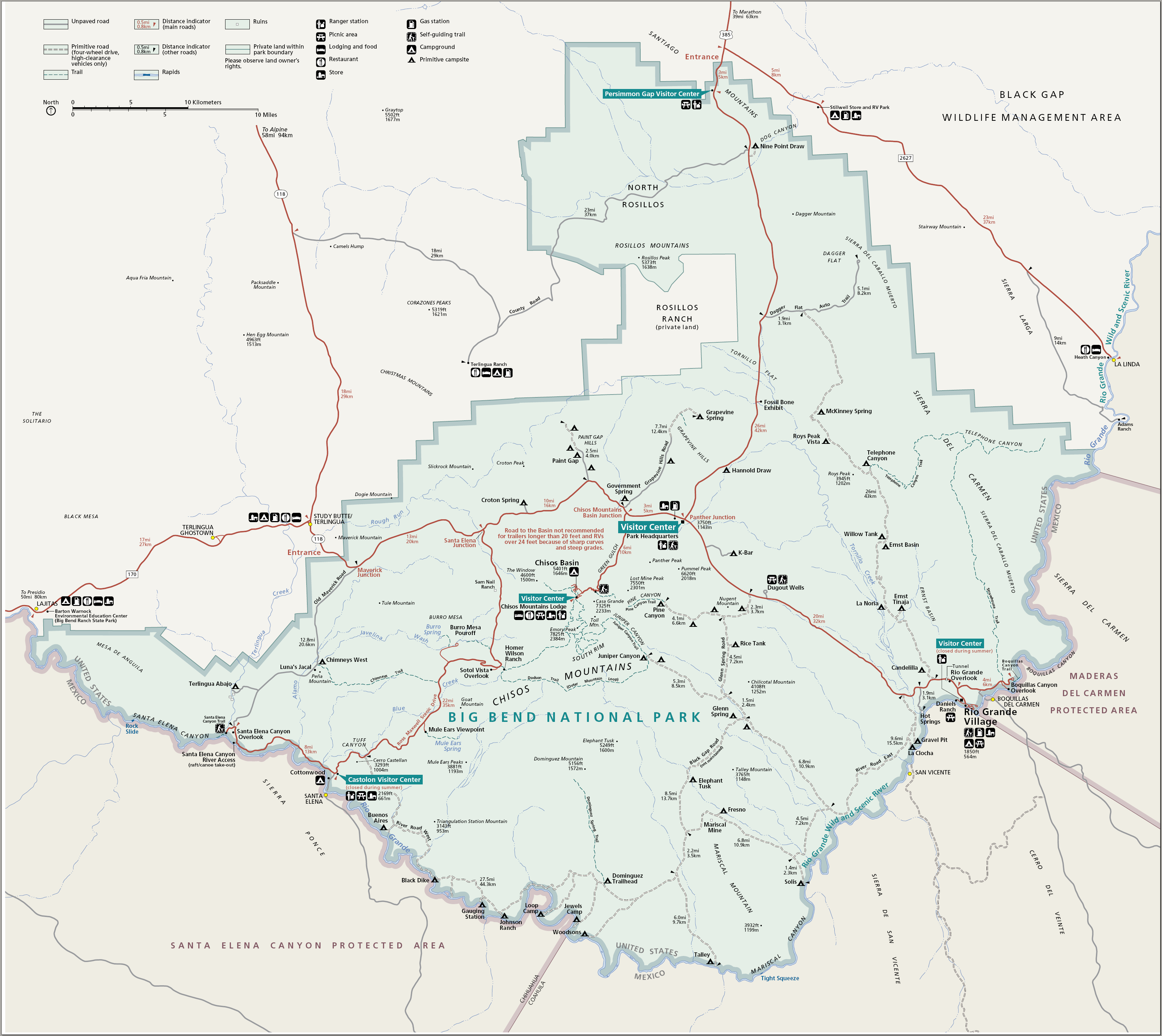
Map of Big Bend

- Ornithology
  - Birds of the Chisos Mountains include 81 total known species that live within six different plant associations. The six plant associations along with the number of known species within them include: the Arroyo-Mesquite-Acacia Association (31 species), the Lechuguilla-Creosotebush-Cactus Association (13 species), the Sotol-Grass Association (32 species), the Deciduous Woodland Association (42 species), the Pinyon-Juniper-Oak Association (32 Species), and the Cypress-Pine-Oak Association (24 species).
- Myrmecology
  - Ants of the Chisos Mountains include 81 total known species within 29 different genera.

== Flora ==
Quercus tardifolia is an evergreen tree with gray bark and reddish-brown twigs. The common name is Chisos Mountains oak which refers to where the species was rediscovered. This species was thought to be extinct when in May 2022, a specimen was found.

== See also ==
- Beach Mountains
- Big Bend (Texas)
- Chihuahuan Desert
- Sierra Madre Oriental pine–oak forests
