= Carpenter Mountain =

Carpenter Mountain can refer to the following mountains in the United States:

- Carpenter Mountain (Idaho), in Benewah County
- Carpenter Mountain (Maine), in Piscataquis County
- Carpenter Mountain (Oregon), in Linn County
- Carpenter Mountain (Texas), in Jeff Davis County
- Carpenter Mountain (Madison County, Virginia)
- Carpenter Mountain (Alleghany County, Virginia)
