= Bartlett Peak (Texas) =

Mountain in Texas, United States

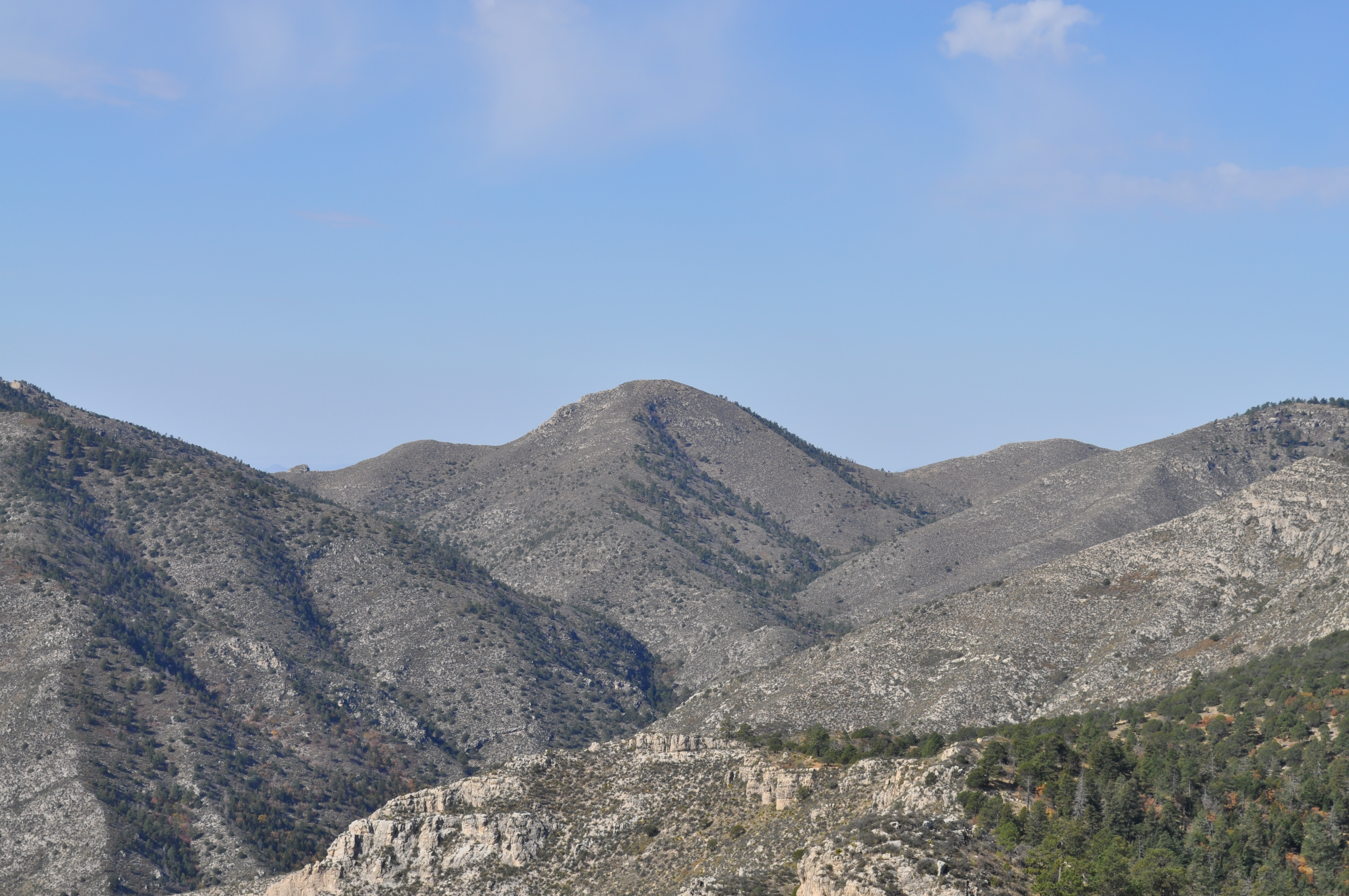
- East aspect

Highest point
- Elevation: 8,519 ft (2,597 m)
- Prominence: 450 ft (137 m)
- Parent peak: Bush Mountain (8,631 ft)
- Isolation: 0.82 mi (1.32 km)
- Coordinates: 31°55′04″N 104°52′55″W

Naming
- Etymology: John Russell Bartlett

Geography
- Location within Texas Location within the United States
- Country: United States
- State: Texas
- County: Culberson
- Protected area: Guadalupe Mountains National Park
- Parent range: Guadalupe Mountains
- Topo map: USGS P X Flat

Geology
- Rock age: Lopingian
- Rock type: Limestone

Climbing
- Easiest route: class 2 hiking

Bartlett Peak is an 8,519-foot-elevation (2,597-meter) summit in Culberson County, Texas, United States.

== Description ==
Bartlett Peak is located in Guadalupe Mountains National Park and it ranks as the fourth-highest peak in the Guadalupe Mountains, the park, the county, and in the state of Texas. The mountain is composed of late Permian limestone like the other peaks in the Guadalupe Mountains. Topographic relief is significant as the summit rises over 4,500 feet (1,372 m) above Salt Basin in three miles (4.8 km). Precipitation runoff from the mountain's slopes drains west to Salt Basin, and east to the Delaware River which is part of the Pecos River watershed. No trail reaches the summit, and the peak is best seen from U.S. Highway 62/180 to the west of the park. The Salt Basin Dunes provides a good location to view the peak from a distance.

== Etymology ==
The mountain's toponym was officially adopted on November 4, 1938, by the United States Board on Geographic Names to commemorate John Russell Bartlett (1805–1886), one of the United States and Mexican Boundary Commissioners. He passed through this region in the 1850s and wrote one of the best early descriptions of these mountains when in 1854 he published A Personal Narrative of Explorations and Incidents in Texas, New Mexico, California, Sonora and Chihuahua, in which he described the Guadalupe Mountains as "a dark, gloomy-looking range, with bold and forbidding sides, consisting of huge piles of rock, their debris heaped far above the surrounding hills."

== Climate ==
Based on the Köppen climate classification, Bartlett Peak is located in a cold semi-arid climate zone with relatively hot summers, calm, mild autumn weather, and cool to cold weather in winter and early spring. Nights are cool, even in summer. Late summer monsoons bring thunderstorms.

== See also ==
- List of mountain peaks of Texas
- Geography of Texas

== Gallery ==
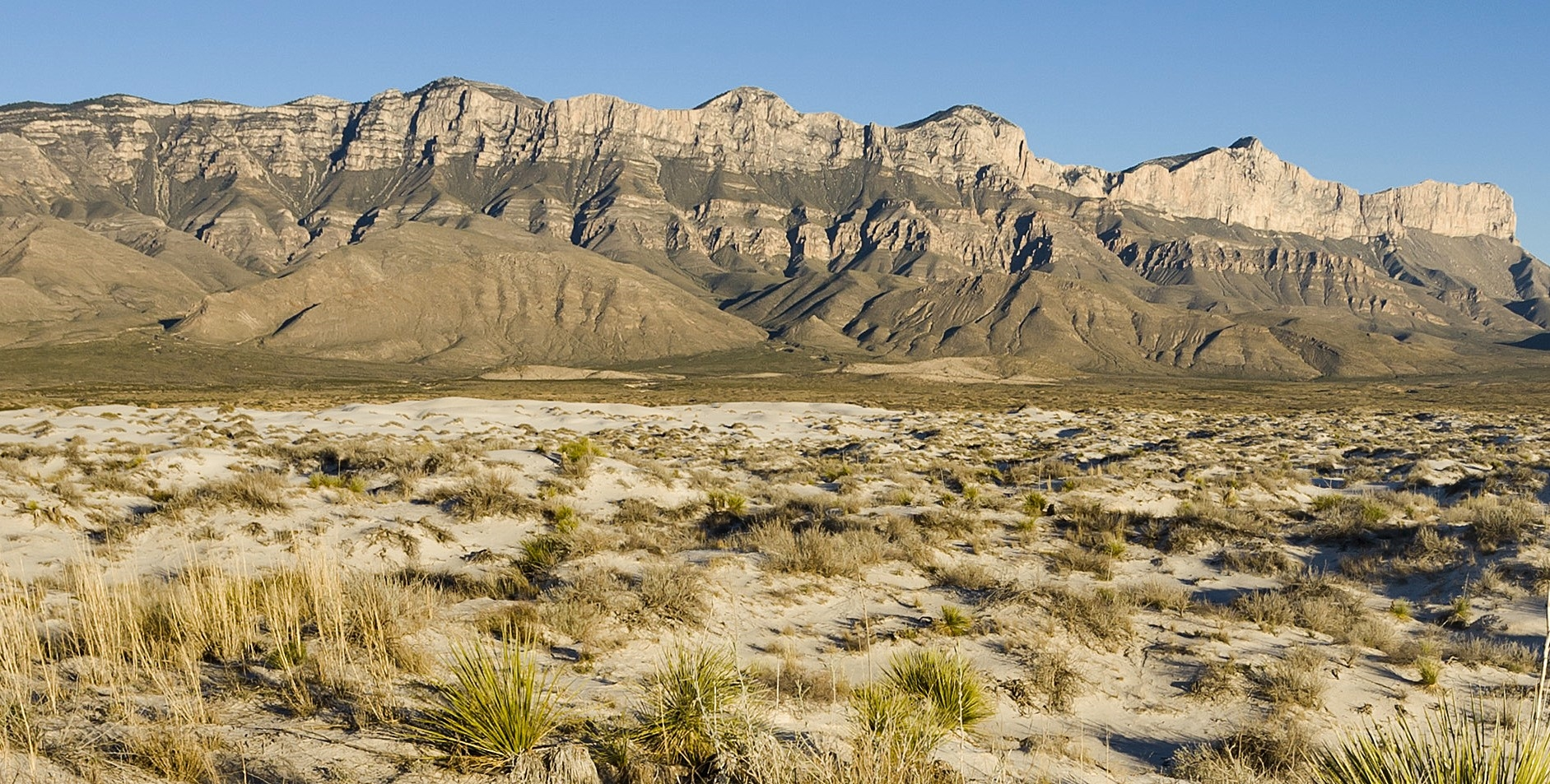
Western escarpment of the Guadalupe Mountains.
Bartlett Peak centered at top. (see file annotations)

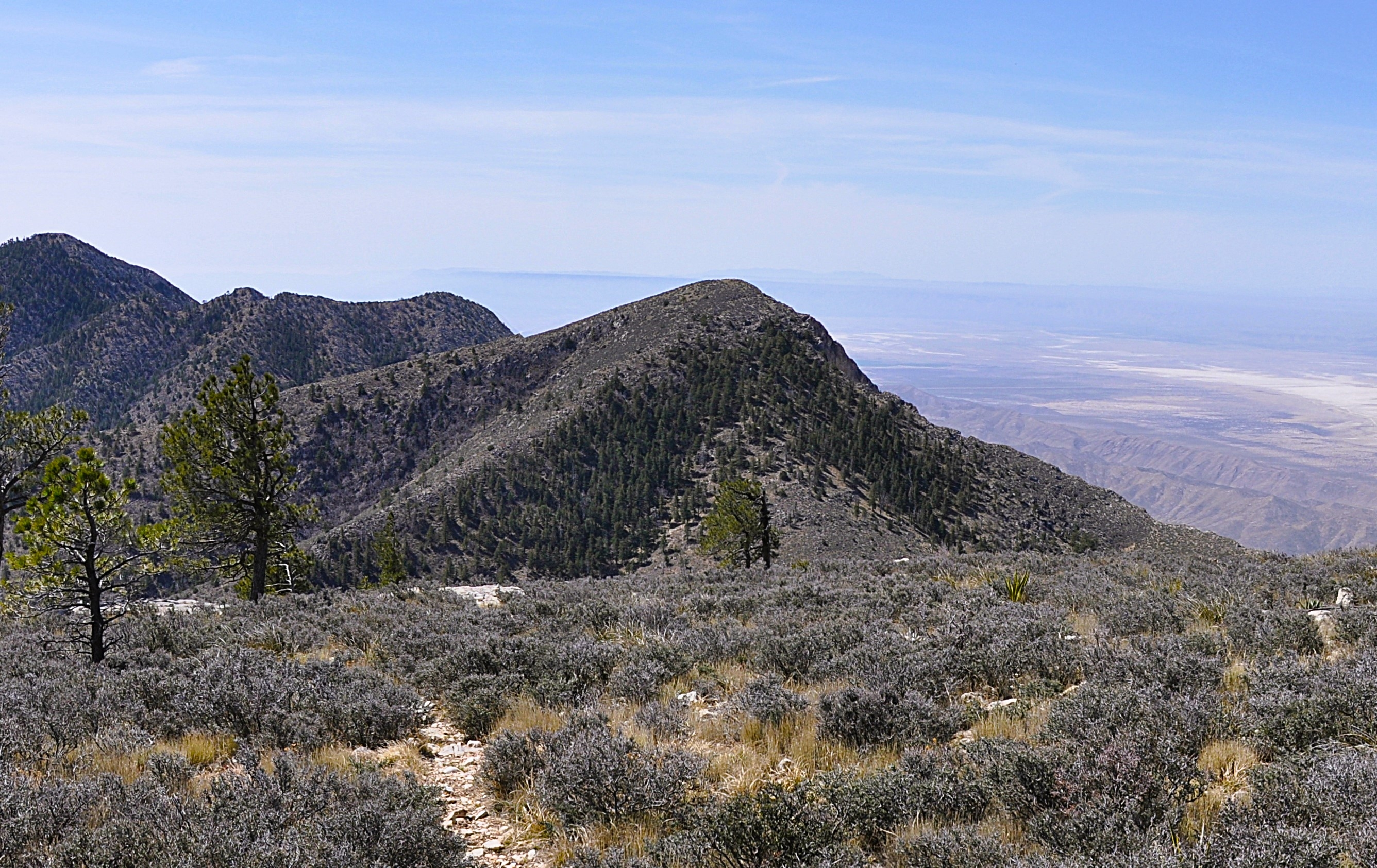
North aspect of Bartlett Peak centered, as seen from Bush Mountain

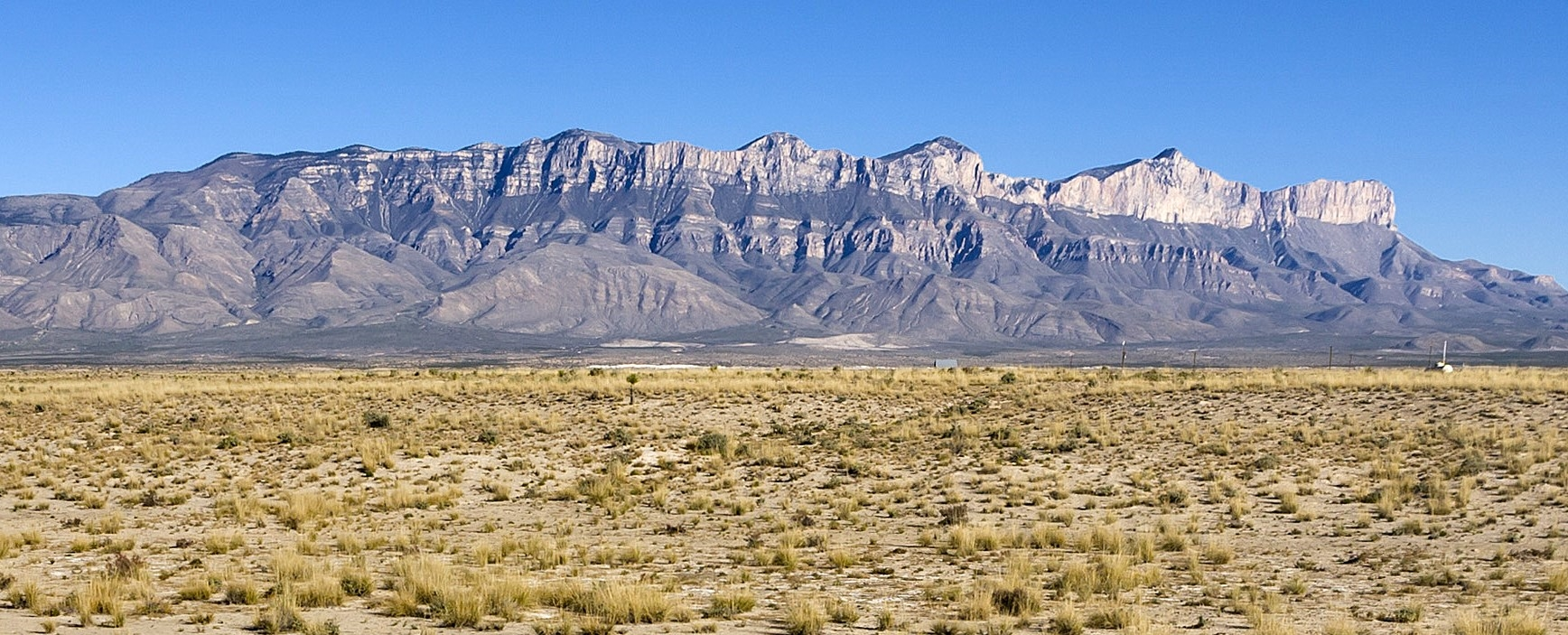
Western escarpment of the Guadalupe Mountains.
Bartlett Peak centered at top. (see file annotations)

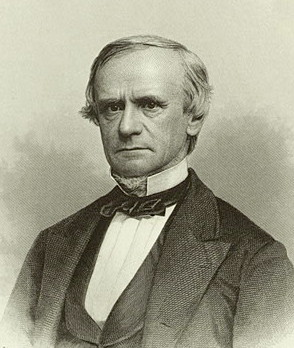
John Russell Bartlett
