= List of mountain peaks of Texas =

This is a list of mountains in the state of Texas greater than 2,000 feet.

Peaks in the state of Texas
Mountain Peak	Elevation	Prominence	Isolation	Location	Mountain range	County
Guadalupe Peak	8,751 ft 2667 m	3,031 ft 924 m	72.6 mi 116.9 km	31.891483°N 104.860727°W	Guadalupe Mountains	Culberson
Shumard Peak	8,635 ft 2632 m	899 ft 274 m	1.37 mi 2.2 km	31.907482°N 104.874481°W	Guadalupe Mountains	Culberson
Bush Mountain	8,631 ft 2631 m	951 ft 290 m	2.87 mi 4.62 km	31.929707°N 104.880097°W	Guadalupe Mountains	Culberson
Bartlett Peak	8,508 ft 2593 m	427 ft 130 m	0.82 mi 1.32 km	31.917852°N 104.88183°W	Guadalupe Mountains	Culberson
Baldy Peak (Mount Livermore)	8,378 ft 2554 m	3,921 ft 1195 m	95.4 mi 153.6 km	30.635656°N 104.173728°W	Davis Mountains	Jeff Davis
Hunter Peak	8,368 ft 2551 m	571 ft 174 m	2.35 mi 3.78 km	31.913747°N 104.830414°W	Guadalupe Mountains	Culberson
Blue Ridge	8,360 ft 2548 m	161 ft 49 m	0.89 mi 1.43 km	31.942533°N 104.878776°W	Guadalupe Mountains	Culberson
Peak 8,342 (Mt. Pratt)	8,342 ft 2543 m	463 ft 141 m	2.24 mi 3.6 km	31.94573°N 104.823845°W	Guadalupe Mountains	Culberson
Blue Ridge – North Peak	8,280 ft 2524 m	121 ft 37 m	0.47 mi 0.75 km	31.948627°N 104.875352°W	Guadalupe Mountains	Culberson
El Capitan	8,085 ft 2464 m	285 ft 87 m	0.98 mi 1.57 km	31.877501°N 104.858101°W	Guadalupe Mountains	Culberson
Peak 8,040	8,040 ft 2451 m	361 ft 110 m	0.68 mi 1.09 km	30.638767°N 104.184502°W	Davis Mountains	Jeff Davis
Peak 7,916	7,917 ft 2413 m	476 ft 145 m	1.56 mi 2.51 km	31.966807°N 104.83356°W	Guadalupe Mountains	Culberson
Lost Peak	7,831 ft 2387 m	151 ft 46 m	1.27 mi 2.05 km	31.969933°N 104.854962°W	Guadalupe Mountains	Culberson
Emory Peak	7,824 ft 2385 m	4,485 ft 1367 m	46.2 mi 74.3 km	29.246045°N 103.305252°W	Chisos Mountains	Brewster
Brooks Mountain	7,779 ft 2371 m	620 ft 189 m	1.4 mi 2.26 km	30.63317°N 104.207223°W	Davis Mountains	Jeff Davis
Chinati Peak	7,728 ft 2355 m	2,946 ft 898 m	49.6 mi 79.8 km	29.953002°N 104.477989°W	Chinati Mountains	Presidio
Paradise Mountain	7,720 ft 2353 m	400 ft 122 m	3.34 mi 5.37 km	30.596297°N 104.141004°W	Davis Mountains	Jeff Davis
McKittrick Ridge	7,717 ft 2352 m	236 ft 72 m	1.59 mi 2.56 km	31.973469°N 104.807587°W	Guadalupe Mountains	Culberson
Pine Peak	7,710 ft 2350 m	725 ft 221 m	3.8 mi 6.12 km	30.655268°N 104.114044°W	Davis Mountains	Jeff Davis
Sawtooth Mountain	7,687 ft 2343 m	1,407 ft 429 m	3.79 mi 6.1 km	30.685094°N 104.228198°W	Davis Mountains	Jeff Davis
Richman Mountain	7,641 ft 2329 m	331 ft 101 m	0.97 mi 1.56 km	30.645632°N 104.162216°W	Davis Mountains	Jeff Davis
Peak 7,625	7,625 ft 2324 m	305 ft 93 m	1.56 mi 2.51 km	31.994643°N 104.817043°W	Guadalupe Mountains	Culberson
Townsend Point	7,559 ft 2304 m	400 ft 122 m	1.01 mi 1.63 km	29.238652°N 103.290743°W	Chisos Mountains	Brewster
Black Mountain	7,543 ft 2299 m	1,381 ft 421 m	9.14 mi 14.71 km	30.722612°N 103.981754°W	Davis Mountains	Jeff Davis
Lost Mine Peak	7,536 ft 2297 m	1,417 ft 432 m	3.21 mi 5.16 km	29.275588°N 103.258465°W	Chisos Mountains	Brewster
Whitetail Mountain	7,484 ft 2281 m	479 ft 146 m	1.84 mi 2.96 km	30.66546°N 104.183445°W	Davis Mountains	Jeff Davis
Eagle Peak	7,484 ft 2281 m	3,114 ft 949 m	53.4 mi 85.9 km	30.92134°N 105.085465°W	Eagle Mountains	Hudspeth
Peak 7,418	7,418 ft 2261 m	299 ft 91 m	1.04 mi 1.68 km	30.581234°N 104.142867°W	Davis Mountains	Jeff Davis
Toll Mountain	7,415 ft 2260 m	420 ft 128 m	1.04 mi 1.67 km	29.254562°N 103.291142°W	Chisos Mountains	Brewster
South Rim Chisos Mountains	7,402 ft 2256 m	82 ft 25 m	0.27 mi 0.43 km	29.232486°N 103.291612°W	Chisos Mountains	Brewster
Pine Mesa	7,402 ft 2256 m	82 ft 25 m	1.35 mi 2.17 km	30.617461°N 104.165277°W	Davis Mountains	Jeff Davis
Casa Grande Peak	7,326 ft 2233 m	568 ft 173 m	0.94 mi 1.51 km	29.267698°N 103.287147°W	Chisos Mountains	Brewster
Brown Mountain	7,323 ft 2232 m	289 ft 88 m	1.57 mi 2.53 km	30.668351°N 104.092412°W	Davis Mountains	Jeff Davis
Peak 7,320	7,320 ft 2231 m	240 ft 73 m	0.78 mi 1.26 km	30.654347°N 104.180694°W	Davis Mountains	Jeff Davis
Peak 7,301	7,300 ft 2225 m	259 ft 79 m	0.66 mi 1.06 km	31.989665°N 104.807444°W	Guadalupe Mountains	Culberson
Blue Mountain	7,287 ft 2221 m	1,526 ft 465 m	7.24 mi 11.65 km	30.565091°N 104.022856°W	Davis Mountains	Jeff Davis
Peak 7,282	7,283 ft 2220 m	282 ft 86 m	1.17 mi 1.88 km	30.920242°N 105.105128°W	Eagle Mountains	Hudspeth
Sierra Parda	7,270 ft 2216 m	1,132 ft 345 m	3.22 mi 5.19 km	29.947248°N 104.531336°W	Chinati Mountains	Presidio
Bear Mountain	7,257 ft 2212 m	1,017 ft 310 m	1.55 mi 2.5 km	30.675076°N 104.251538°W	Davis Mountains	Jeff Davis
McDaniel Mountain	7,234 ft 2205 m	633 ft 193 m	2.34 mi 3.76 km	30.696512°N 104.167632°W	Davis Mountains	Jeff Davis
North Franklin Mountain	7,192 ft 2192 m	2,982 ft 909 m	25.1 mi 40.5 km	31.903028°N 106.493649°W	Franklin Mountains	El Paso
Peak 7,150	7,149 ft 2179 m	469 ft 143 m	1.27 mi 2.04 km	29.240404°N 103.325249°W	Chisos Mountains	Brewster
Crown Mountain	7,119 ft 2170 m	561 ft 171 m	1.39 mi 2.24 km	29.257302°N 103.248682°W	Chisos Mountains	Brewster
Peak 7,120	7,119 ft 2170 m	279 ft 85 m	0.87 mi 1.4 km	30.59262°N 104.127007°W	Davis Mountains	Jeff Davis
Peak 7,095	7,096 ft 2163 m	377 ft 115 m	0.62 mi 0.99 km	30.690267°N 104.219726°W	Davis Mountains	Jeff Davis
Peak 7,070	7,070 ft 2155 m	269 ft 82 m	0.55 mi 0.88 km	29.24813°N 103.323286°W	Chisos Mountains	Brewster
Davis Peak 7,040	7,041 ft 2146 m	400 ft 122 m	1.18 mi 1.9 km	30.680496°N 104.160491°W	Davis Mountains	Jeff Davis
Guadalupe Peak 7,040	7,041 ft 2146 m	240 ft 73 m	1.91 mi 3.07 km	31.970327°N 104.775269°W	Guadalupe Mountains	Culberson
Chisos Peak 7,040	7,041 ft 2146 m	240 ft 73 m	0.43 mi 0.7 km	29.275519°N 103.265695°W	Chisos Mountains	Brewster
San Antonio Mountain	7,024 ft 2141 m	1,804 ft 550 m	2.87 mi 4.62 km	31.99512°N 105.549358°W	Cornudas Mountains	Hudspeth
Crown Mountain West Peak	7,011 ft 2137 m	571 ft 174 m	0.71 mi 1.14 km	29.260397°N 103.259849°W	Chisos Mountains	Brewster
Peak 7,000	7,001 ft 2134 m	761 ft 232 m	2.4 mi 3.87 km	30.712027°N 104.253978°W	Davis Mountains	Jeff Davis
Sierra Blanca	6,890 ft 2100 m	2,251 ft 686 m	26.8 mi 43.1 km	31.252078°N 105.435841°W	None	Hudspeth
Mount Locke	6,759 ft 2060 m	558 ft 170 m	4.16 mi 6.7 km	30.671621°N 104.02255°W	Davis Mountains	Jeff Davis
Cerro Alto Mountain	6,703 ft 2043 m	1,447 ft 441 m	25 mi 40.2 km	31.945278°N 105.97°W	Hueco Mountains	Hudspeth
Quitman Mountains High Point	6,690 ft 2039 m	2,031 ft 619 m	7.92 mi 12.74 km	31.149725°N 105.496648°W	Quitman Mountains	Hudspeth
Diablo Rim	6,640 ft 2024 m	1,939 ft 591 m	29.7 mi 47.8 km	31.45°N 104.90°W	Sierra Diablo	Culberson
Santiago Peak	6,526 ft 1989 m	2,444 ft 745 m	24.3 mi 39.1 km	29.835321°N 103.416272°W	Santiago Mountains	Brewster
Beach Mountains Peak	5,827 ft 1776 m	1,726 ft 526 m	3.34 mi 5.38 km	31.138103°N 104.868947°W	Beach Mountains	Culberson
Sue Peaks	5,853 ft 1784 m	2,913 ft 888 m	17.04 mi 27.4 km	29.420799°N 102.980046°W	Sierra del Carmen	Brewster
Carpenter Mountain	5,826 ft 1776 m	406 ft 124 m	1.33 mi 2.14 km	30.518611°N 104.065833°W	Davis Mountains	Jeff Davis
Christmas Mountains High Point	5,728 ft 1746 m	2,388 ft 728 m	12.19 mi 19.62 km	29.425293°N 103.442347°W	Christmas Mountains	Brewster
Rosillo Peak	5,446 ft 1660 m	2,106 ft 642 m	13.99 mi 22.5 km	29.53092°N 103.244164°W	Rosillos Mountains	Brewster
Needle Peak	4,608 ft 1405 m	821 ft 250 m	1.35 mi 2.17 km	29.428248°N 103.810191°W	The Solitario	Presidio
Jumbo Hill	3,422 ft 1043 m			32.3959462°N 102.9426826°W	None	Andrews
Double Mountains	2,580 ft 786 m	540 ft 165 m	31.6 mi 50.9 km	33.06498°N 100.438402°W	Double Mountains	Stonewall
Leonard Mountain	5,868 ft 1789 m	1,190 ft 363 m		30.3251653°N 103.2321178°W	Glass Mountains	Brewster
Castle Peak	2,341 ft 714 m	291 ft 89 m	13.25 mi 21.3 km	32.3672°N 100.0001°W	None	Taylor
Mount Old Baldy	1,849 ft 564 m			29.5755°N 99.729889°W	None	Uvalde
