= Bush Mountain =

Bush Mountain may refer to:

- Bush Mountain (Texas) in Culberson County
- Bush Mountains in Antarctica
