= Sierra Blanca (Texas) =

Mountain in Texas, United States

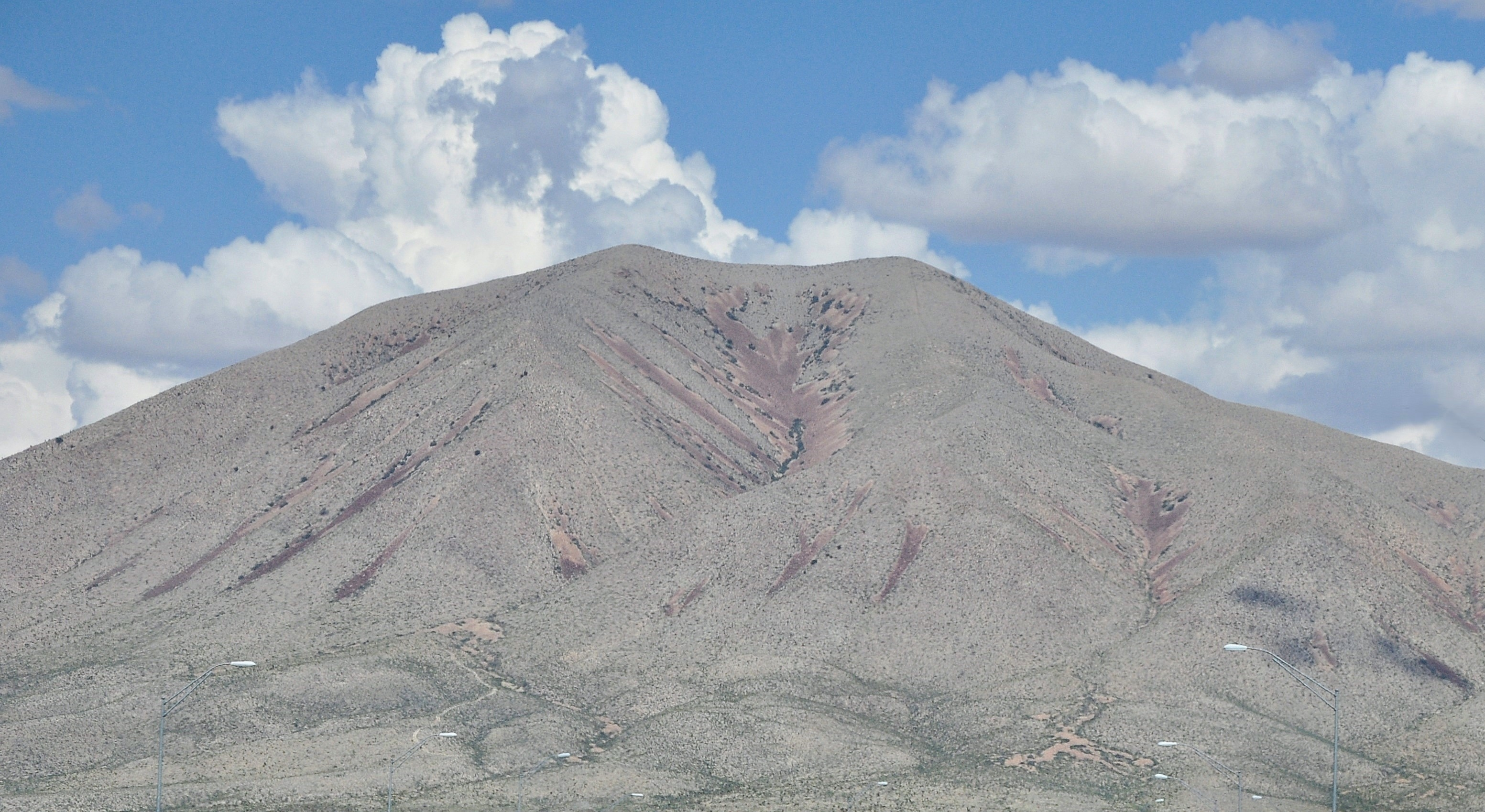
- Southwest aspect, from Interstate 10

Highest point
- Elevation: 6,892 ft (2,101 m)
- Prominence: 2,254 ft (687 m)
- Isolation: 26.82 mi (43.16 km)
- Coordinates: 31°15′08″N 105°26′09″W

Naming
- Etymology: White Mountain

Geography
- Location within Texas Location within the United States
- Country: United States
- State: Texas
- County: Hudspeth
- Parent range: Sierra Blanca
- Topo map: USGS Gunsight Hills South

Geology
- Rock age: Oligocene
- Mountain type: Laccolith
- Rock type: Intrusive igneous rock (Rhyolite)

Climbing
- Easiest route: class 2 hiking

Sierra Blanca is a 6,892-foot-elevation (2,101-meter) summit in Hudspeth County, Texas, United States.

== Description ==
Sierra Blanca is set in the Chihuahuan Desert, six miles (9.7 km) northwest of the town of Sierra Blanca which is named after this mountain. The volcanic peak ranks as the highest point in the Sierra Blanca range, the sixth-highest summit in the county and 54th-highest in the state. It is a prominent landmark along Interstate 10 in Texas, as it is ranked 10th in topographic prominence in the state. Topographic relief is significant as the summit rises 2,400 feet (732 m) above the surrounding terrain in two miles (3.2 km). The mountain is a laccolith composed of late Oligocene rhyolite which intruded sedimentary layers of limestone, shale, and sandstone of Cretaceous age. Based on the Köppen climate classification, the mountain is located in a hot arid climate zone with hot summers and mild winters. Any scant precipitation runoff from the peak's slopes drains to the Rio Grande which is less than 20 miles to the southwest. The mountain's Spanish name translates as "White Mountain" which is attributable to white flowers which grow on the slopes, and may have been so named by the Spanish explorer, Francisco Vázquez de Coronado. The mountain's toponym has been officially adopted by the United States Board on Geographic Names, and has been reported in publications since at least 1890. However, the town is named after the mountain, and the town was founded in 1881 at the completion point of a southern transcontinental railway southeast of the mountain where a silver spike was laid.

== See also ==
- List of mountain peaks of Texas
- Geography of Texas

== Gallery ==
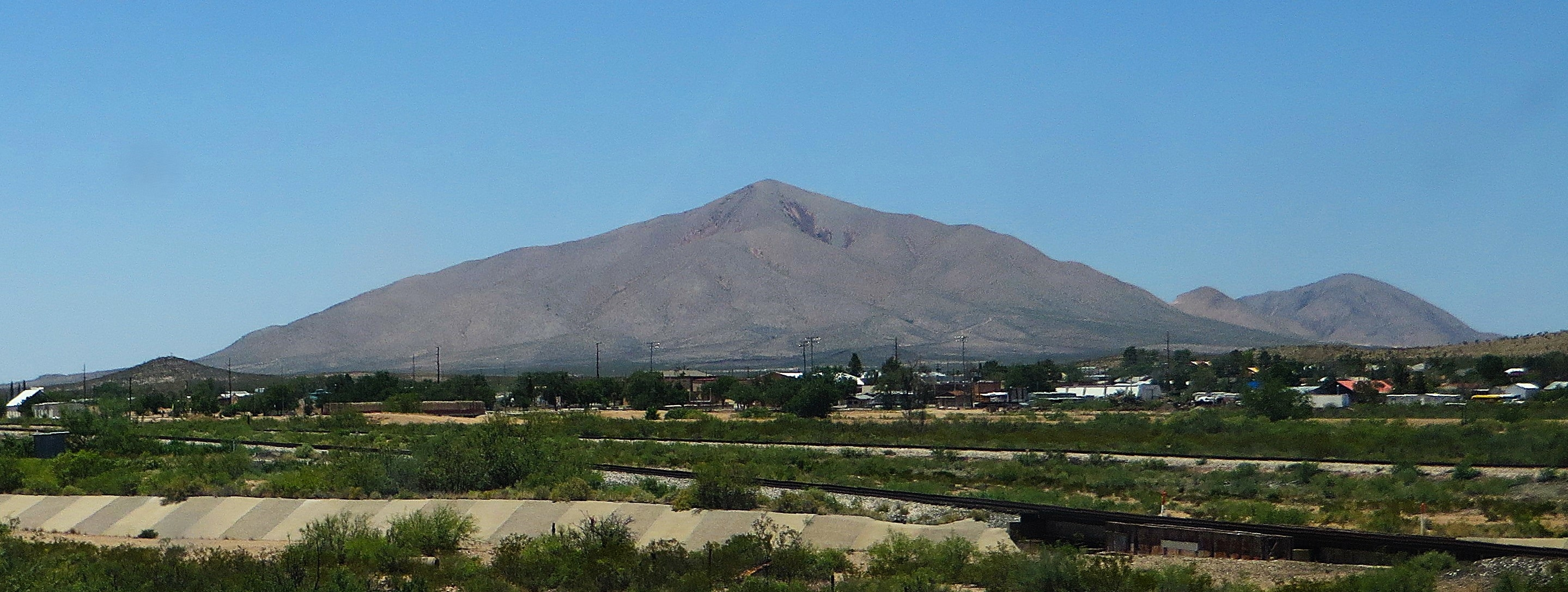
Southeast aspect of Sierra Blanca viewed from the town of Sierra Blanca

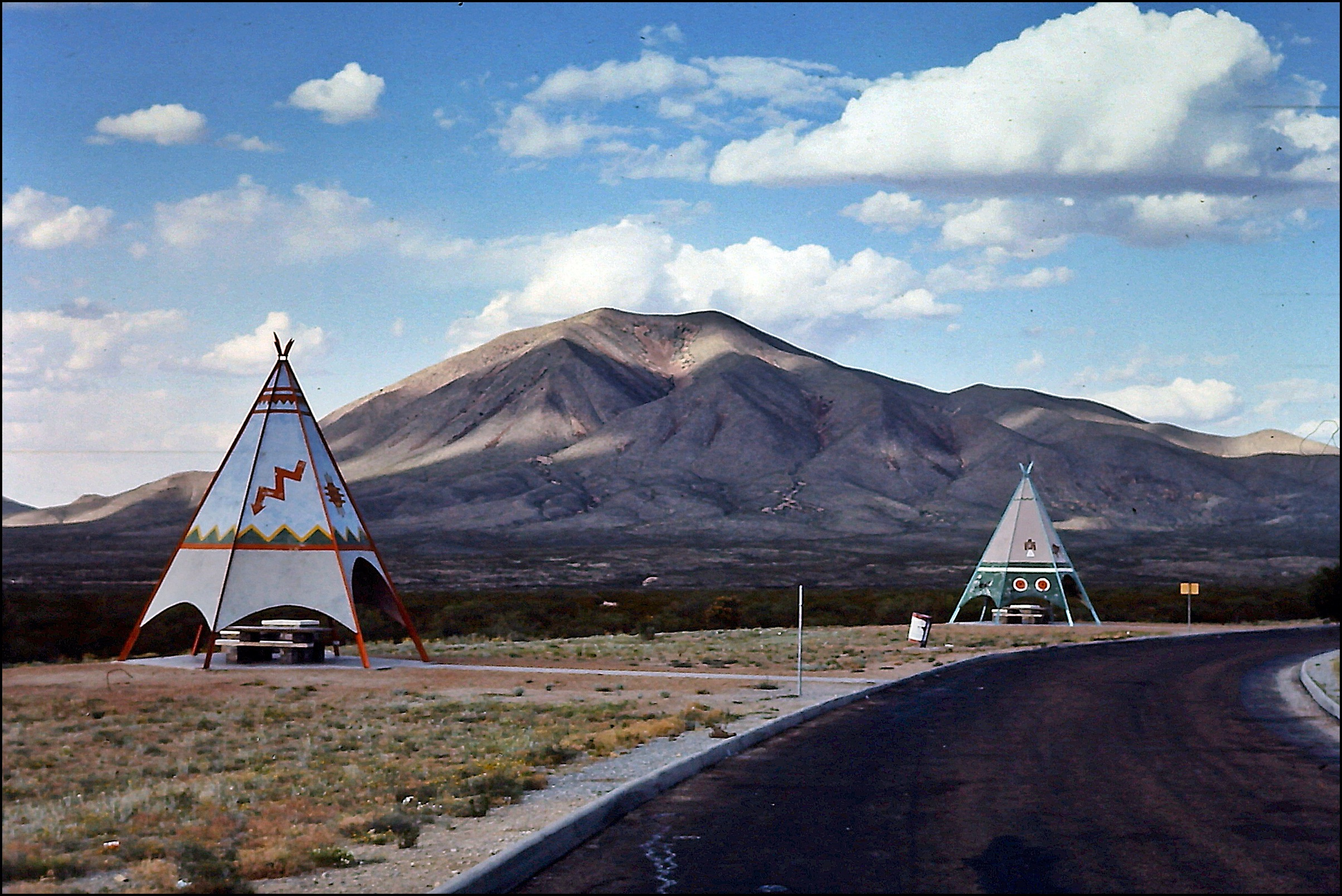
Sierra Blanca from southwest
