= Crown Mountain (Texas) =

Mountain in Texas, United States

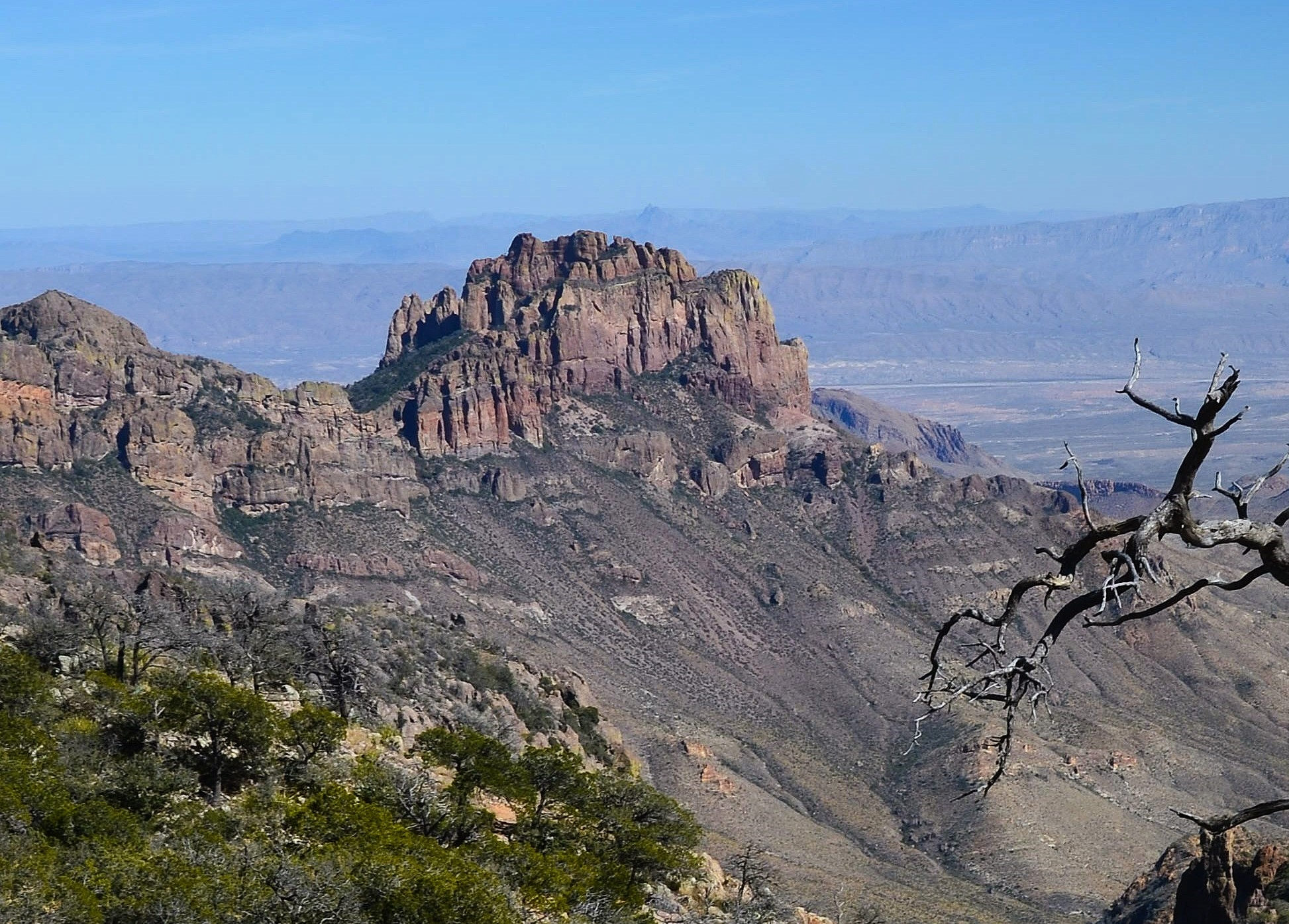
- Southwest aspect

Highest point
- Elevation: 7,155 ft (2,181 m)
- Prominence: 629 ft (192 m)
- Parent peak: Lost Mine Peak (7,547 ft)
- Isolation: 1.39 mi (2.24 km)
- Coordinates: 29°15′22″N 103°14′32″W

Geography
- Location within Texas Location within the United States
- Country: United States
- State: Texas
- County: Brewster
- Protected area: Big Bend National Park
- Parent range: Chisos Mountains
- Topo map: USGS Panther Junction

Geology
- Rock age: Paleogene
- Rock type: Volcanic rock

Climbing
- Easiest route: class 4

Crown Mountain is a 7,155-foot-elevation (2,181-meter) summit in Brewster County, Texas, United States.

== Description ==
Crown Mountain is located in Big Bend National Park and the Chisos Mountains. It ranks as the sixth-highest peak in this park, mountain range, and county, but only the 34th-highest in Texas. The mountain is composed of volcanic rock of the Chisos Formation which formed during the Paleogene period. Although modest in elevation, topographic relief is significant as the summit rises nearly 2,000 feet (610 m) above Pine Canyon in 0.75 miles (1.21 km), and 2,650 feet (808 m) above Juniper Canyon in 1.25 miles (2.01 km). Based on the Köppen climate classification, Crown Mountain is located in a hot arid climate zone with hot summers and mild winters. Any scant precipitation runoff from the mountain's slopes drains into the Rio Grande watershed, with the river 15 miles southeast of the peak. The lower slopes of the peak are covered by juniper, oak, and piñon. The mountain's toponym has been officially adopted by the United States Board on Geographic Names.

== See also ==
- List of mountain peaks of Texas
- Geography of Texas

== Gallery ==
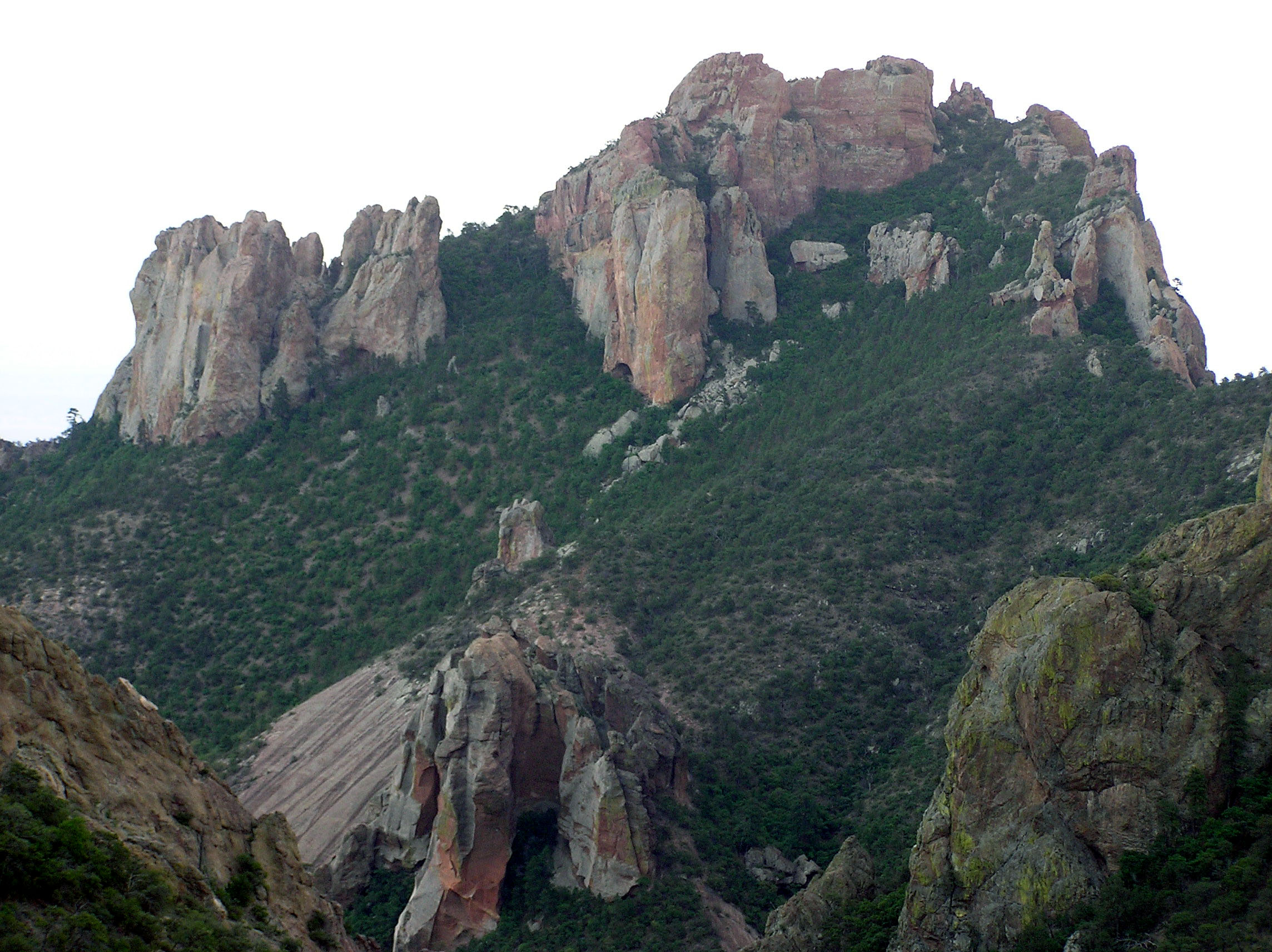
Northwest aspect

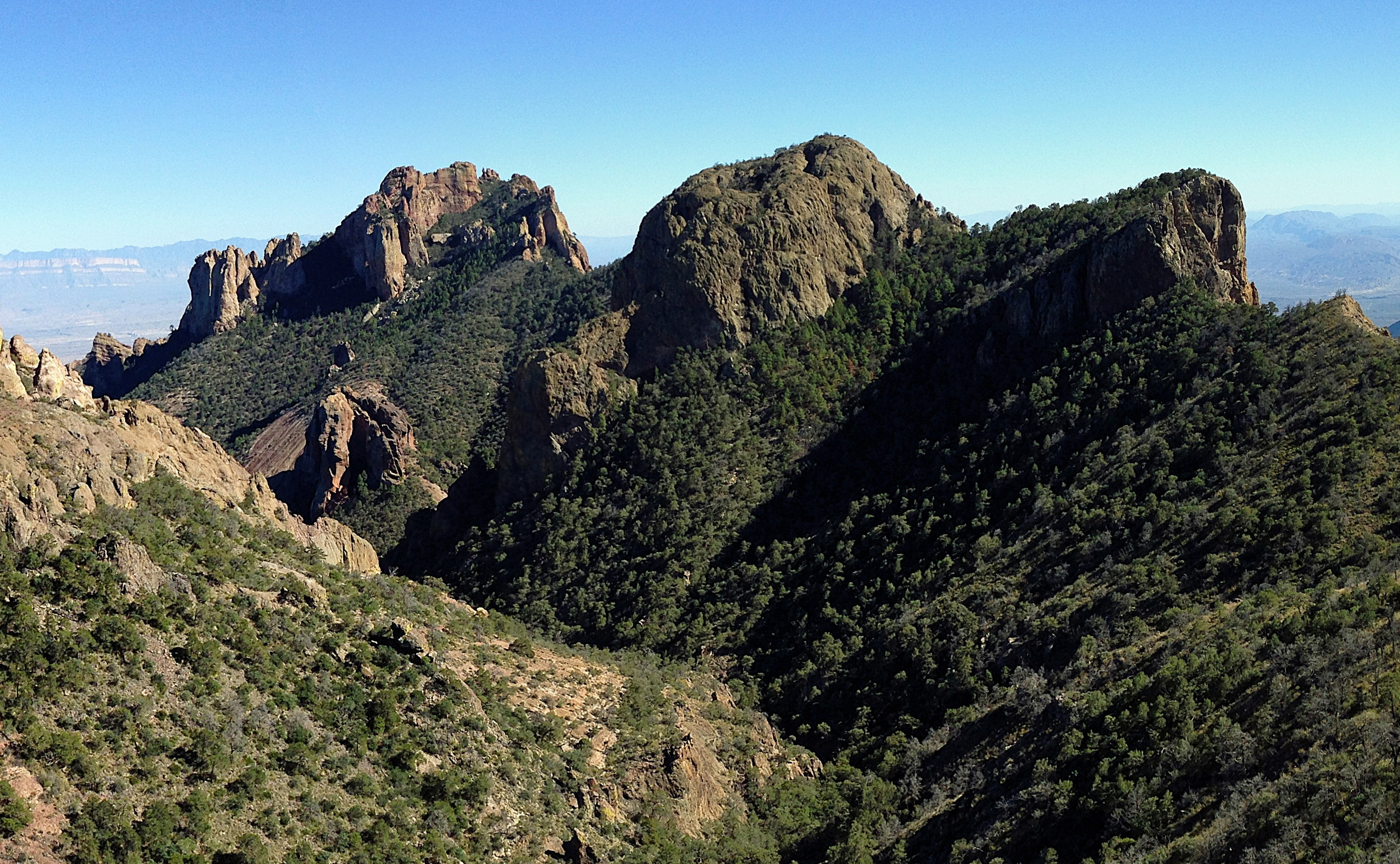
Northwest aspect from Lost Mine Trail.
Crown's west peak centered, east peak (true summit) to left.

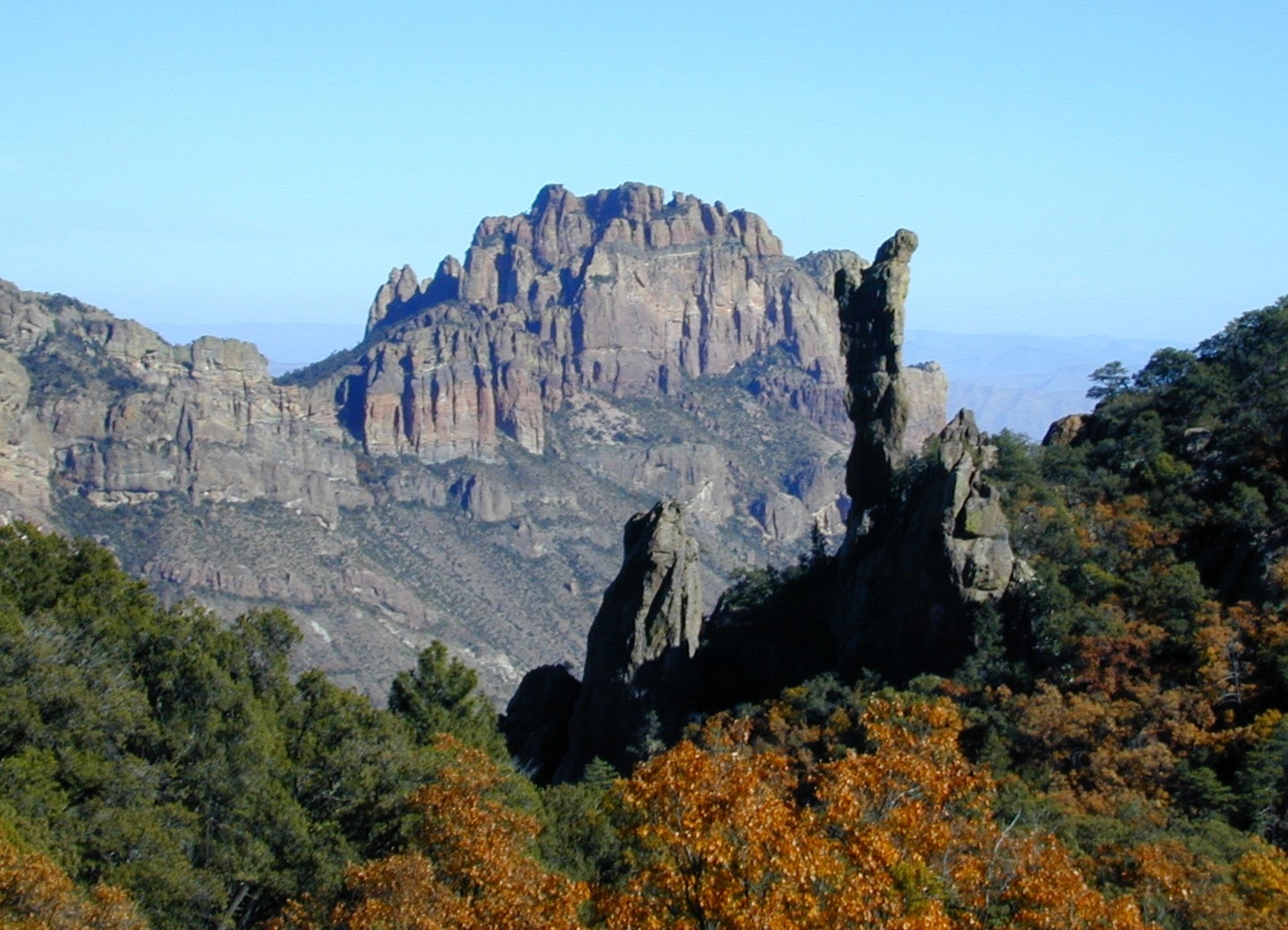
Southwest aspect, with Boot Rock in foreground

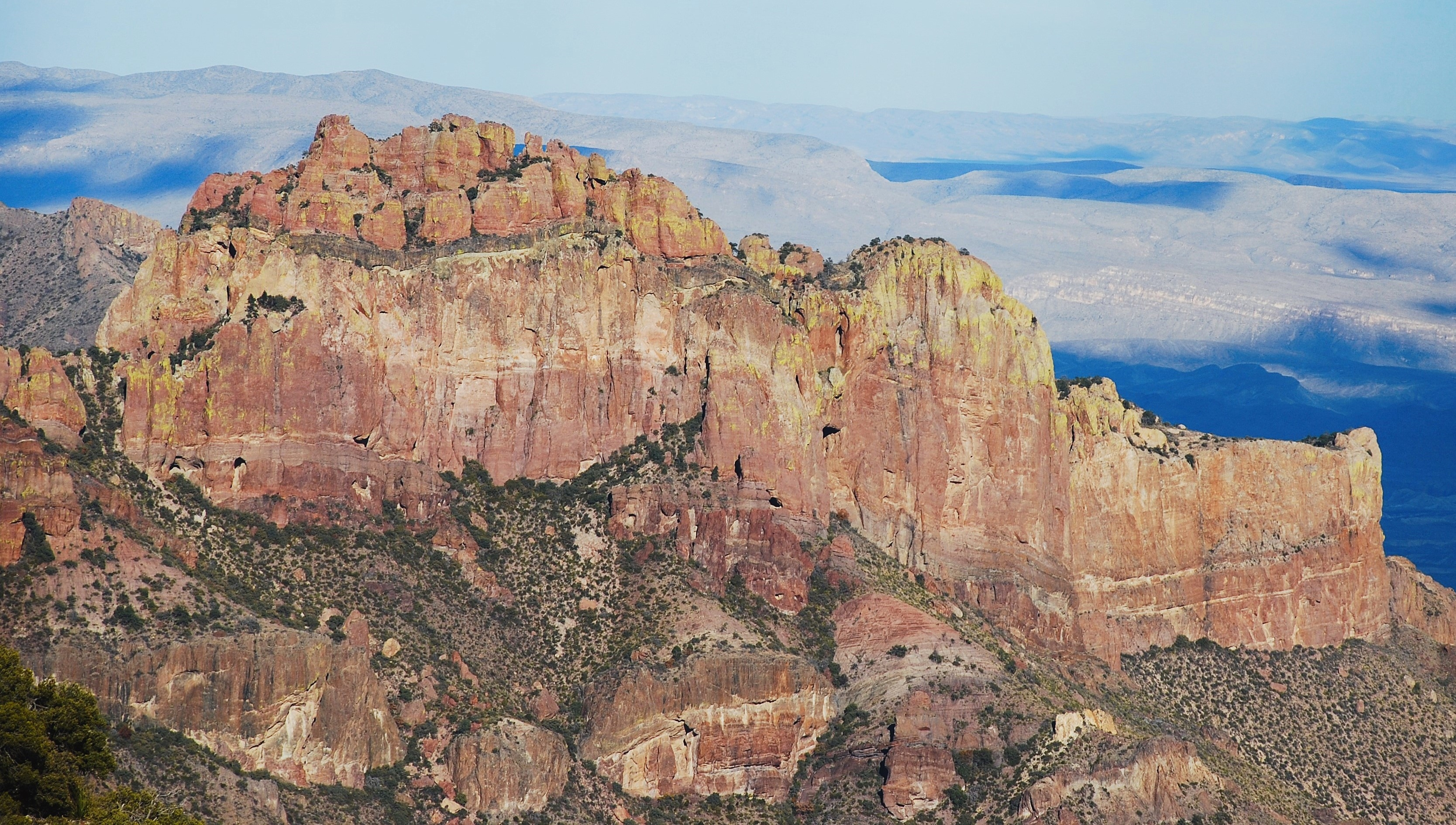
Southwest aspect
