= Santiago Peak (Texas) =

Mountain in Texas, United States

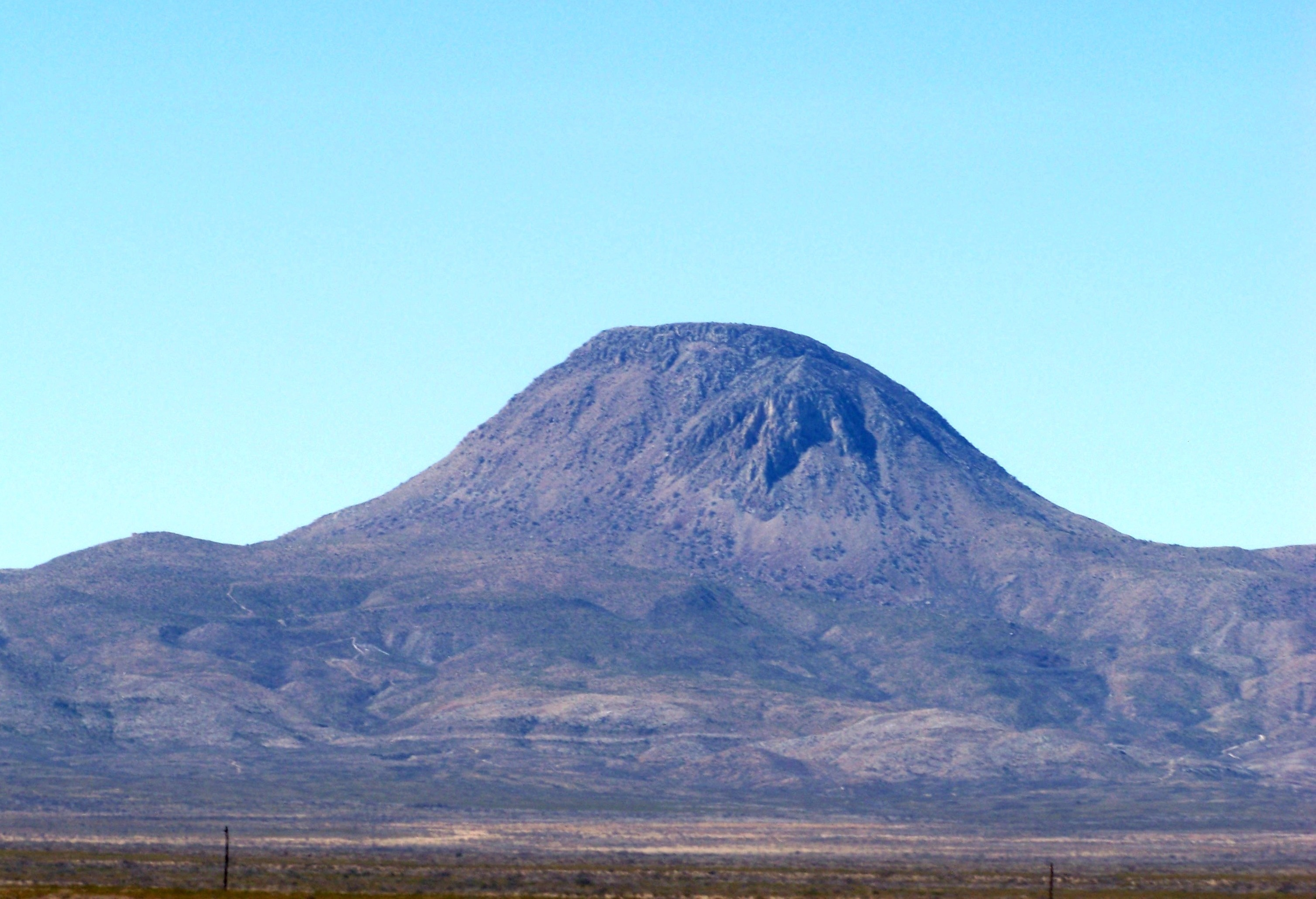
- East-northeast aspect

Highest point
- Elevation: 6,522 ft (1,988 m)
- Prominence: 2,440 ft (744 m)
- Parent peak: Mount Ord (6,803 ft)
- Isolation: 24.34 mi (39.17 km)
- Coordinates: 29°50′07″N 103°24′59″W

Geography
- Location within Texas Location within the United States
- Country: United States
- State: Texas
- County: Brewster
- Parent range: Santiago Mountains
- Topo map: USGS Santiago Peak

Geology
- Rock age: 35 Ma (Eocene)
- Mountain type: Volcanic plug
- Rock type: Igneous rock (Syenite)
- Volcanic arc: Trans-Pecos Volcanic Field

Climbing
- Easiest route: class 2+

Santiago Peak is a 6,522-foot-elevation (1,988-meter) summit in Brewster County, Texas, United States.

== Description ==
Santiago Peak is the highest point in the Santiago Mountains and it ranks eighth in topographic prominence in the state of Texas. It is set in the Chihuahuan Desert where it is a landmark seen for many miles from Highway 118. Although modest in elevation, topographic relief is significant as the summit rises 2,500 feet (762 m) above the surrounding terrain in 1.25 mile (2 km). The lofty summit served as a lookout for Apache, with remnants of their campsite still found there. The mountain is composed of syenite, a 35 million-year-old igneous rock that intruded Cretaceous sedimentary rock, mostly limestones.

Based on the Köppen climate classification, Santiago Peak is located in a hot arid climate zone with hot summers and mild winters. This desert climate supports scrub brush, creosote bush, cacti, grasses, live oak, and mesquite growing on the slopes. Any scant precipitation runoff from the mountain's slopes drains to the Rio Grande via Chalk Draw, Nine Point Draw, and Maravillas Creek. The mountain's toponym has been officially adopted by the United States Board on Geographic Names, and has been reported in publications since at least 1902. Legend has it that the mountain was named after Santiago, an Indian fighter from Presidio del Norte who was killed by Apache at the base of this peak.

== See also ==
- List of mountain peaks of Texas
- Geography of Texas

== Gallery ==
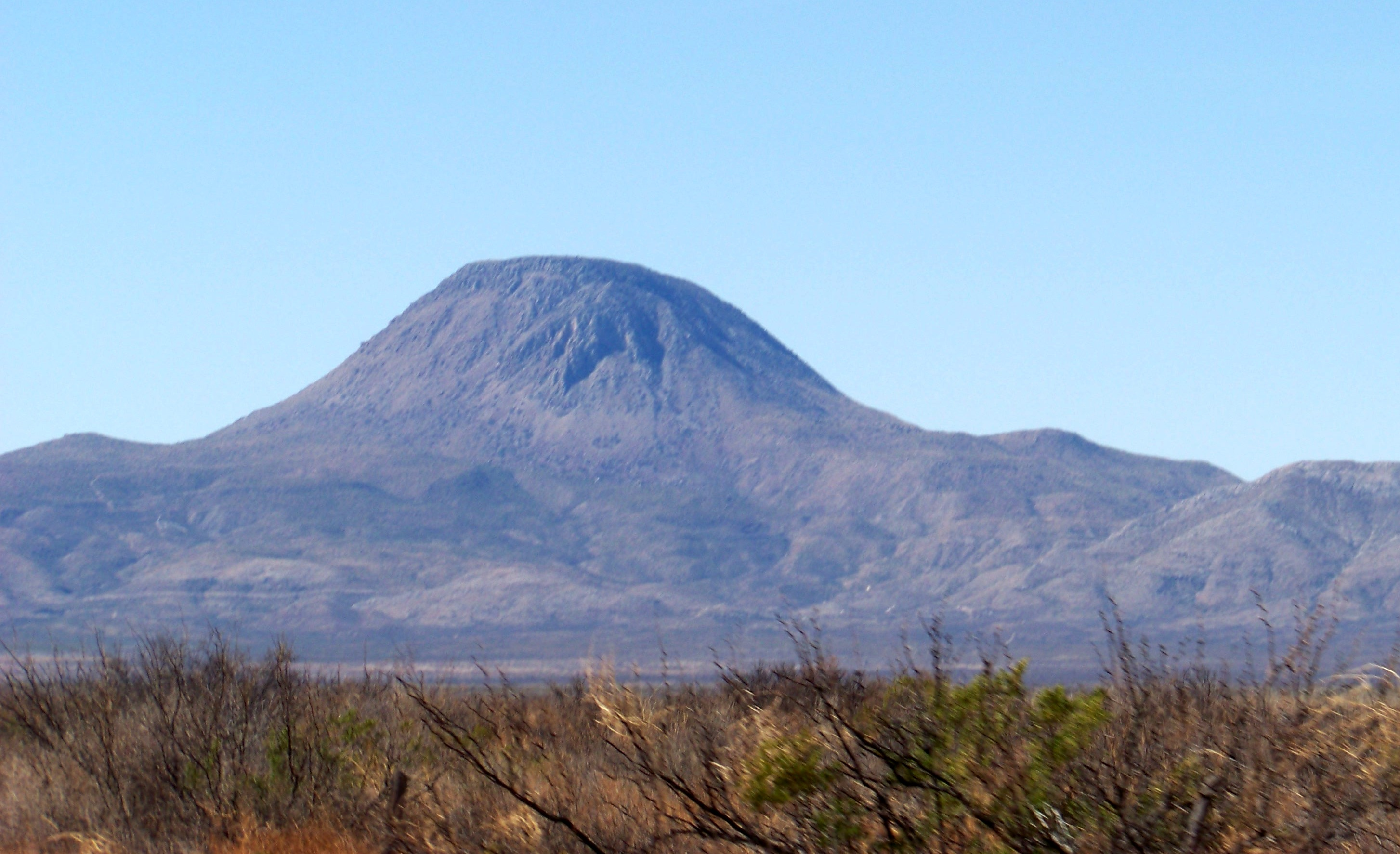

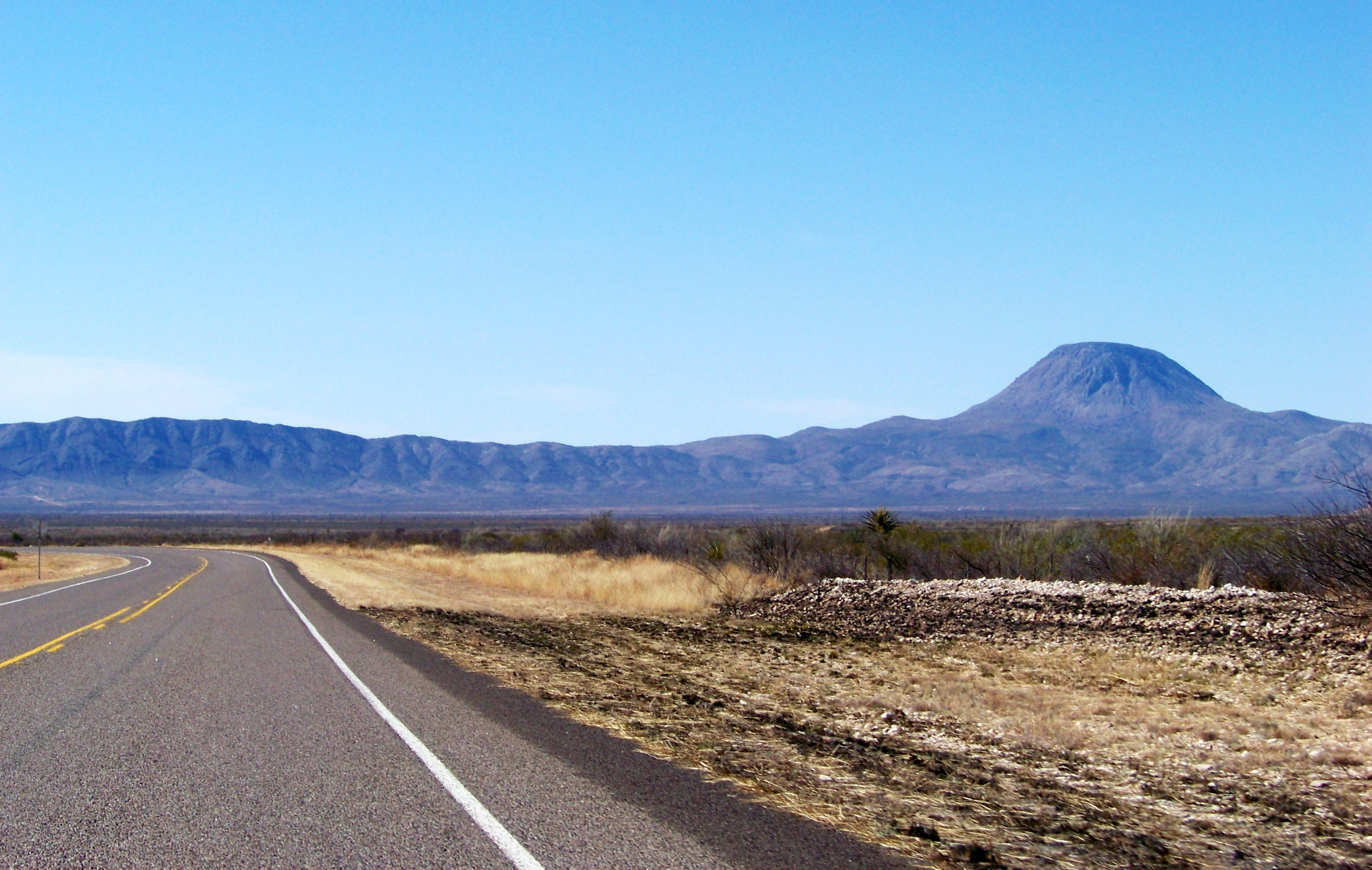
Santiago Peak (right) from Highway 385
