= Black Mountain (Jeff Davis County, Texas) =

Mountain in Texas, United States

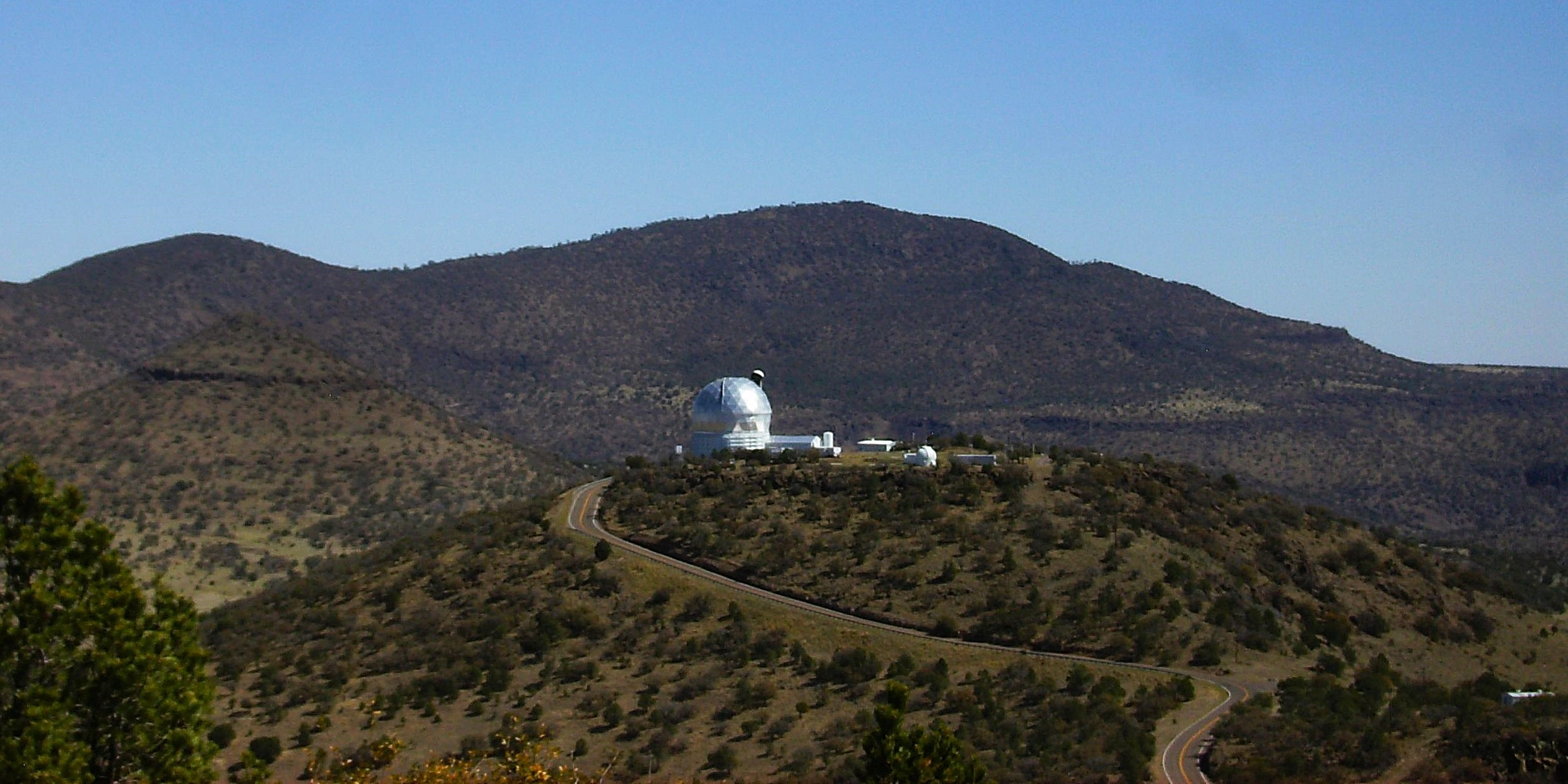
- Southwest aspect, centered on horizon

Highest point
- Elevation: 7,546 ft (2,300 m)
- Prominence: 1,404 ft (428 m)
- Parent peak: Pine Peak (7,710 ft)
- Isolation: 9.15 mi (14.73 km)
- Coordinates: 30°43′21″N 103°58′54″W

Geography
- Location within Texas Location within the United States
- Country: United States
- State: Texas
- County: Jeff Davis
- Parent range: Davis Mountains
- Topo map: USGS Casket Mountain

Geology
- Rock age: 35 Ma (Eocene)
- Rock type: Igneous rock
- Volcanic arc: Trans-Pecos Volcanic Field

Black Mountain is a 7,546-foot-elevation (2,300-meter) summit in Jeff Davis County, Texas, United States.

== Description ==
Black Mountain is the ninth-highest peak in the Davis Mountains and it ranks as 21st-highest in the state of Texas. Topographic relief is significant as the summit rises over 2,000 feet (610 m) above Big Aguja Canyon in 1.25 mile (2 km). The mountain is composed of 35 million-year-old igneous rock. Based on the Köppen climate classification, Black Mountain is located in a semi-arid climate zone with hot summers and cold winters. This climate supports Douglas fir, aspen, Arizona cypress, maple, ponderosa pine, and madrone growing on the slopes. Precipitation runoff from the mountain's slopes drains into the Pecos River watershed. The mountain's toponym has been officially adopted by the United States Board on Geographic Names, and has been reported in publications since at least 1902.

== See also ==
- List of mountain peaks of Texas
- Geography of Texas

== Gallery ==
Black Mountain in the distance with McDonald Observatory in the foreground

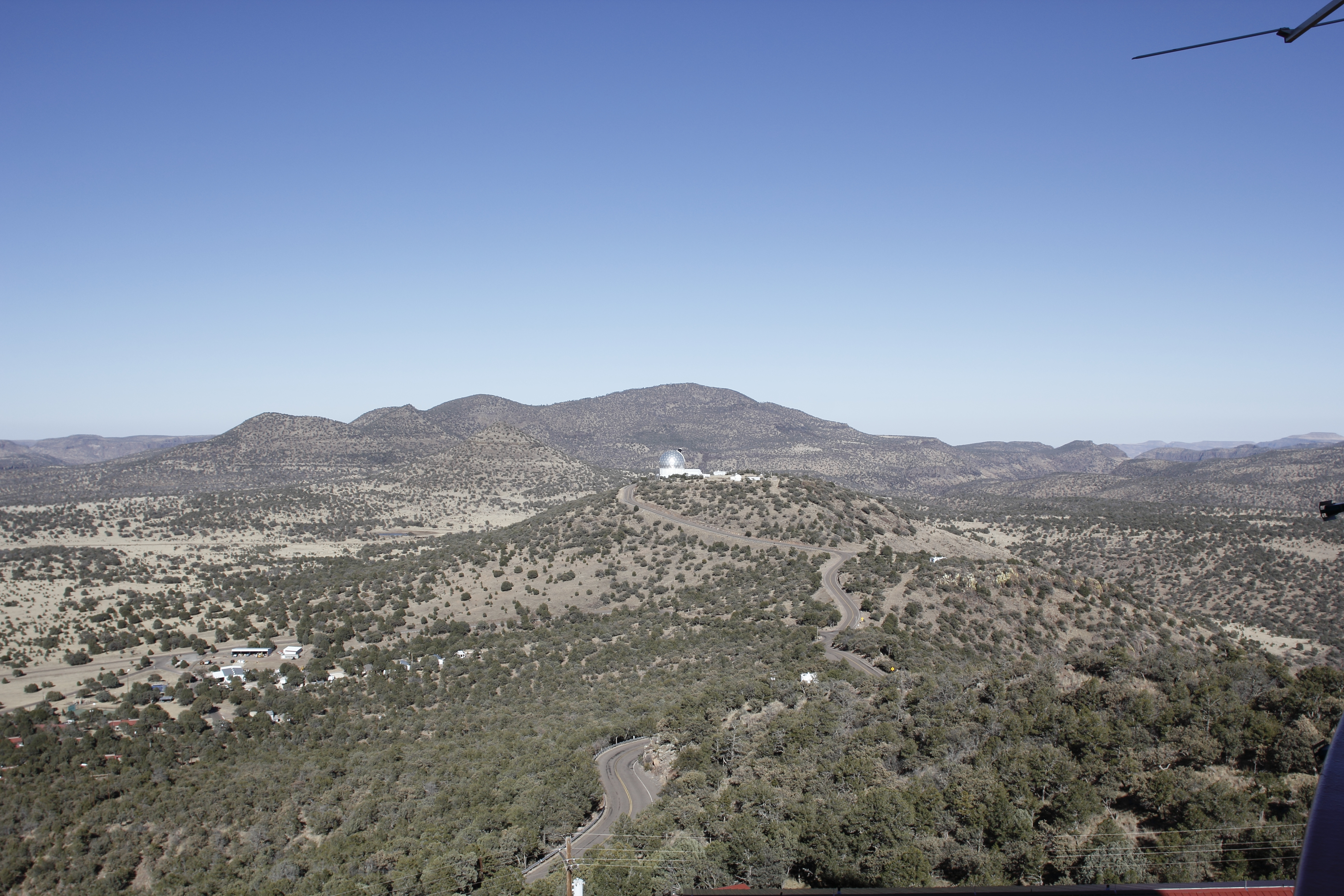
Black Mountain centered in the distance
