= Andrews Forest =

H.J. Andrews Experimental Forest
- IUCN category IV (habitat/species management area)
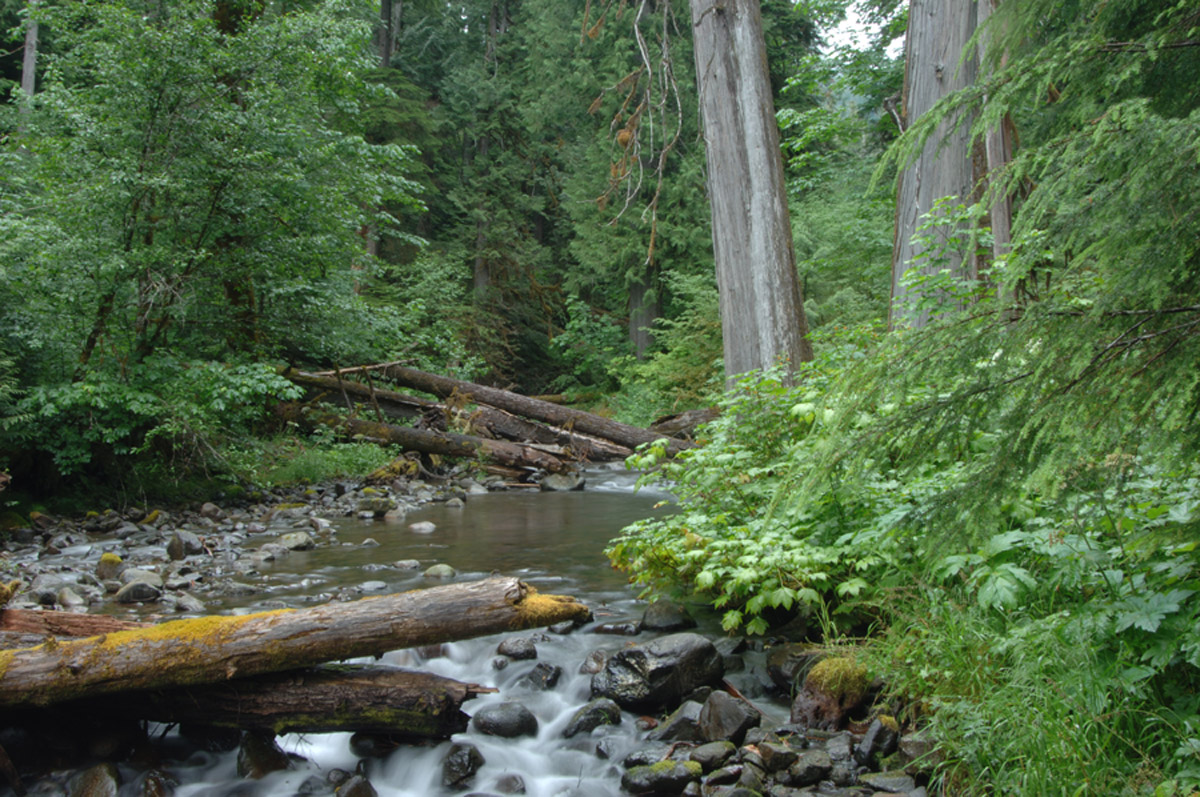
- Lookout Creek at the Andrews Forest (2005).

- Location within Oregon Location within the United States
- Location: between Blue River and Belknap Springs, Lane and Linn, Oregon, United States
- Coordinates: 44°12′44.2″N 122°15′19″W
- Area: 6,400 ha (25 sq mi)
- Established: 1948
- Governing body: Oregon State University and United States Forest Service
- Website: andrewsforest.oregonstate.edu

The H.J. Andrews Experimental Forest, commonly referred to as Andrews Forest, is located near Blue River, Oregon, United States, and is managed cooperatively by the United States Forest Service's Pacific Northwest Research Station, Oregon State University, and the Willamette National Forest. It was one of only 610 UNESCO International Biosphere Reserves, until being withdrawn from the program as of June 14, 2017, and a Long Term Ecological Research site. It is situated in the middle of the Western Cascades.

There is a roughly 1300 m elevation difference between the lowest point of the forest near the headquarters and living facilities and its highest point at the summit of Carpenter Mountain. North- and west- facing slopes of the forest are exemplary of temperate rainforest, and old-growth forest covers 40% of the forest's surface area.

== Administration ==
The current official mission of the H.J. Andrews Experimental Forest is to support research on forests, streams, and watersheds, and to foster strong collaboration among ecosystem science, education, natural resource management, and the humanities.

Through 1970s, the site was part of the International Biological Programme-Coniferous Forest Biome (IBP-CFB), and in 1976 it was designated a Biosphere Reserve as part of the United Nations' Man and the Biosphere Program. In 1948, the site was established as an experimental forest by the US Forest Service and in 1980 the site became a charter member of the National Science Foundation's Long-Term Ecological Research (LTER) Program.

== History ==
Andrews Forest was named for Horace Justin Andrews, a forester.

The history of the research program at the Andrews Forest has been diverse, with the dominant themes changing over time. Research emphasis in the 1950s and 1960s concerned effects of forest management (clearcutting, prescribed fire, roads) on streamflow, soil erosion, and water quality. During the International Biological Program of the 1970s, basic studies centered on the workings of the forest and stream ecosystems, especially in old-growth forests. In the 1980s, these basic studies continued under LTER and were augmented with applied research in silviculture, wildlife, landscape ecology, carbon dynamics, and other topics. Conflict over federal forestry in the 1990s focused attention on old-growth, spotted owl, and landscape ecology. With growing concern about climate change in the 2000s, analysis of long-term records and effects of mountain topography on ecosystem response to climate variability took center stage.

== Research ==
The Andrews Forest Program has many components and is supported by a variety of grants, contracts and private donors. Research within the LTER program since the 1990s is concerned with how land use, natural disturbances, and climate affect carbon and nutrient dynamics, biodiversity, and hydrology. More current research focuses on the roles of topography on interactions among drivers and responders, including feedback responses, and on how the highly diverse topography of the Andrews Forest may influence ecosystem responses to potential climate change. In addition Andrews Forest researchers are expanding inquiry to consider the Andrews Forest as part of a coupled natural/human system.

=== Current research projects ===
- Detritral input and removal treatments (DIRT)
- Biomicrometeorology group (BmM)
- Vegetation Survey Group (Veg)
- Ecosystem Informatics Group
  - Eco-Informatics Summer Institute (EISI)
- Bird Survey Group
  - Northern Spotted Owl survey
- 200-year log decomposition experiment
- Uneven Aged Management Project

== Outreach ==
The Andrews Forest Program includes a very broad spectrum of outreach activities with multiple objectives and funding sources. The Education program provides an opportunity for undergraduate and graduate classes from regional and international schools to visit the forest for field courses, study tours and research experiences.

Innovative K-12 programs give teachers the experience and skills to lead authentic research projects with their students, and middle school students the unique opportunity to study the forest on the ground and in the canopy. The Andrews Forest Program develops research-management partnerships in which insights and information flow in both directions, projects are undertaken jointly to develop the scientific basis for addressing land management challenges, and broad communication of key findings is a priority. The program actively promotes arts and humanities inquiry into the nature of forests, streams and selves through the LTEReflections program.

=== LTEReflections ===
Since 2002, the Andrews Forest has engaged poets, essayists, philosophers, religious scholars – in the Long-Term Ecological Reflections program jointly sponsored by the Forest Service Pacific Northwest Research Station and the Spring Creek Project for Ideas, Nature, and the Written Word in the School of Religion, Philosophy, and History at Oregon State University. Raw data (e.g., journal entries) and published works of more than 40 writers in residence are posted on The Forest Log.

This work is part of a larger effort to encourage arts-humanities-environmental science collaboration across a network of about 20 sites and programs characterized by long-term, place-based work that collects, archives and actively disseminates the work of artists, scientists, and creative writers of many persuasions.
