= Carpenter Mountain (Alleghany County, Virginia) =

Mountain in Virginia, United States

Coordinates: 37.73013°N 79.98783°W

Carpenter Mountain is located in Alleghany County, Virginia.

The summit at 2,690 feet (820 meters) above sea level is approximately 4.5 miles (7.2 km) south of Covington, Virginia. An unofficial variant name for Carpenter Mountain is Carpenter's Mountain.
