= Carpenter Mountain (Oregon) =

Mountain in Oregon, United States

Highest point
- Elevation: 5,353 ft (1,632 m) NAVD 88
- Prominence: 2,029 ft (618 m)
- Coordinates: 44°18′6″N 122°8′15″W

Geography
- Topo map: USGS Carpenter Mountain

Geology
- Rock age: Miocene
- Mountain type(s): Igneous (summit is basalt), with significant amounts of volcanic sediment near the base

Climbing
- Easiest route: Carpenter Mountain Trail (maintained by the USFS), mostly class 1, with a short class 3 scramble to the summit and fire lookout

Carpenter Mountain is a mountain located in Linn County, Oregon in the Willamette National Forest. It is part of the Cascade Range, and is one of the highest and easternmost peaks of the low-lying Western Cascades. A fire lookout on the summit was built in 1934 and has been recently reactivated for use. It marks the northernmost point in the H.J. Andrews Experimental Forest.

== Route ==
Due to its remoteness and rough road conditions, the summit is relatively inaccessible compared to most other area mountains with a maintained trail and is mostly hiked by researchers resident in the Experimental Forest or hikers familiar with the region. The trailhead is located on a Forest Service road near an overlook. The trail is approximately 1 mile long with an elevation gain of 1,000 feet. It is heavily used by ecology researchers, and temperature sensors and blazes for bushwhacked routes are visible from the trail. Although the route is short, reaching the summit requires a short rock scramble that is doable without any equipment.

== Summit ==
There is a historic fire lookout which occupies much of the summit. The summit, a large basaltic block, is an ancient volcanic plug. From the lookout, there are views of the Three Sisters, Mount Washington, Three Fingered Jack, Mount Jefferson and much of the central Oregon Cascades. On clear days, it is possible to see Mount Hood.
