= Carpenter Mountain (Texas) =

Mountain in Texas, United States

- Location within Texas

Highest point
- Elevation: 5,826 ft (1,776 m)
- Prominence: 406 ft (124 m)
- Parent peak: Peak 5,940
- Coordinates: 30°31′07″N 104°03′57″W

Geography
- Location: Jeff Davis County, Texas, U.S.
- Topo map: USGS Blue Mountain

Carpenter Mountain is a mountain peak in Jeff Davis County, Texas. Its summit is 5,826 feet (1,776 m) above sea level. Carpenter Mountain is about 12 mi (19 km) west-southwest of Fort Davis, Texas.
