= Bush Mountain (Texas) =

Mountain in Texas, United States

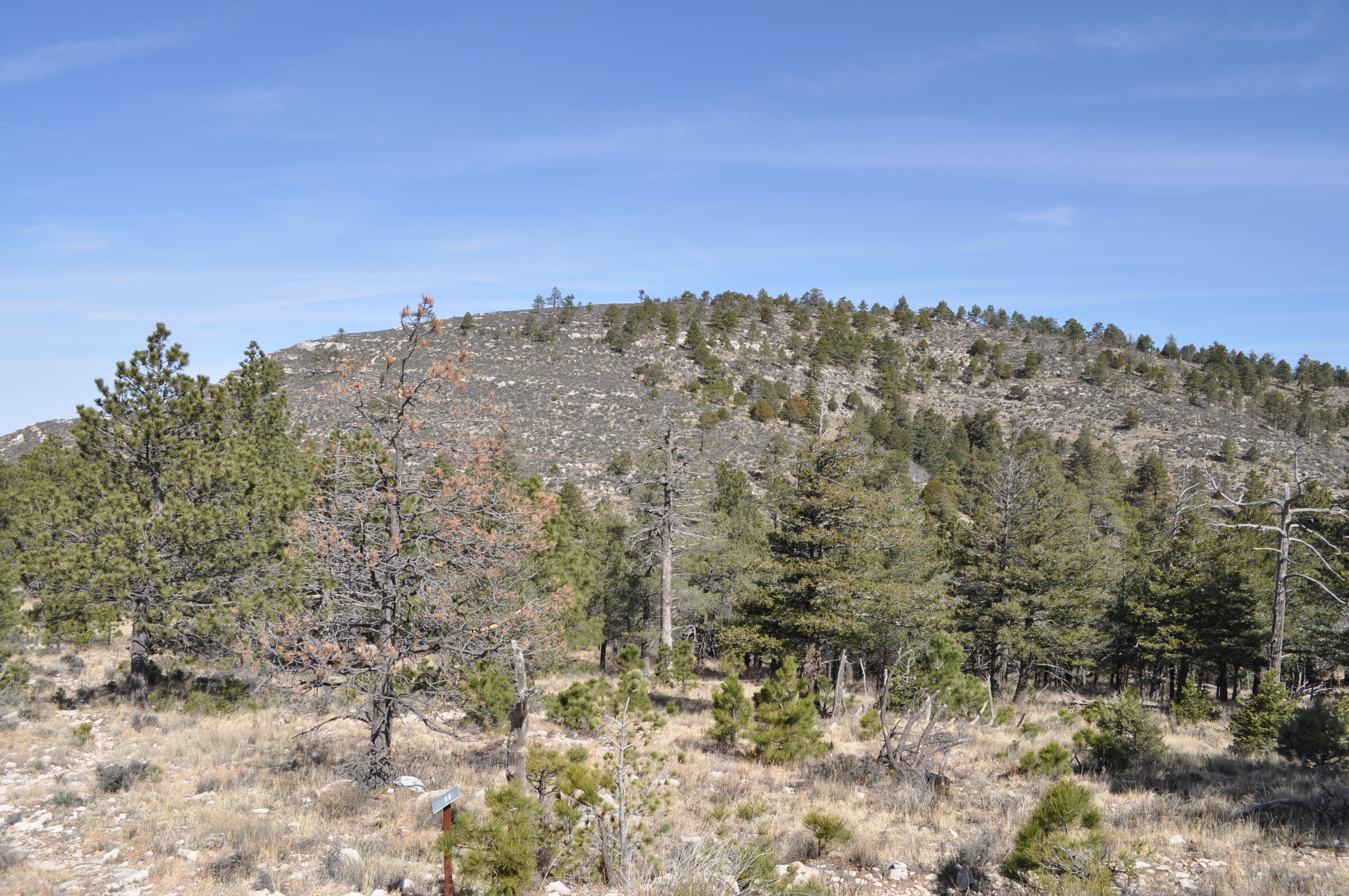

Highest point
- Elevation: 8,631 ft (2,631 m)
- Prominence: 951 ft (290 m)
- Parent peak: Guadalupe Peak
- Coordinates: 31°55′46″N 104°52′49″W

Geography
- Location within Texas
- Location: Culberson County, Texas, U.S.
- Parent range: Guadalupe Mountains
- Topo map: USGS P X Flat

Climbing
- Easiest route: Hiking, class 1

Bush Mountain, at an elevation of 8,631 feet (2,631 m) is the second highest peak in the U.S. state of Texas. Located in the Guadalupe Mountains of Culberson County, Bush Mountain is about 2.87 miles (4.62 km) northwest of Guadalupe Peak, its nearest higher neighbor. Its proximity to Guadalupe Peak gives Bush Mountain the 22nd greatest prominence of any mountain in Texas at 951 feet (290 m). Bush Mountain is within the Guadalupe Mountains Wilderness of Guadalupe Mountains National Park and can only be accessed via hiking or horseback.

Bush Mountain can be accessed via trailheads at both Pine Springs (6.7 miles (10.8 km) one way) and Dog Canyon in Guadalupe Mountains National Park, and the Bush Mountain Trail passes over the summit of the mountain. The Bush Mountain Campground is located along the trail just below the southeast side of the summit, and the National Park Service has a radio repeater on the summit.

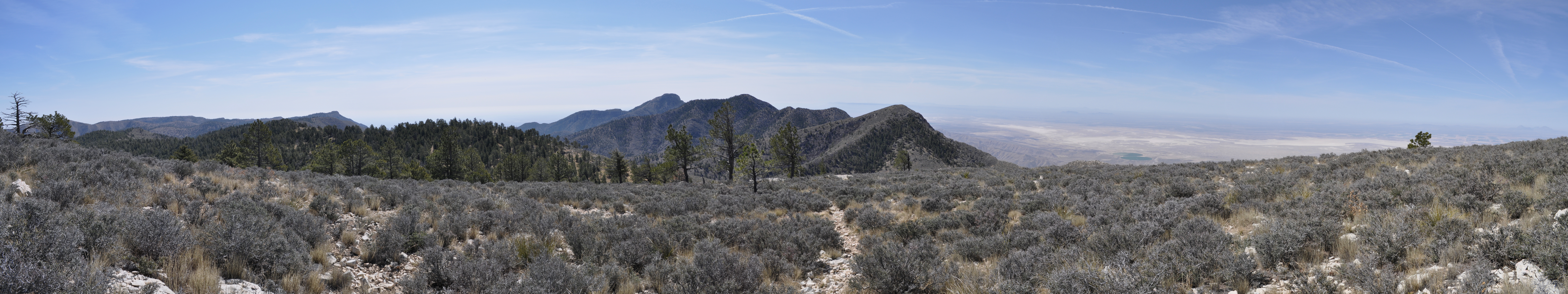
View southeast from the summit with Guadalupe Peak in the distance at center
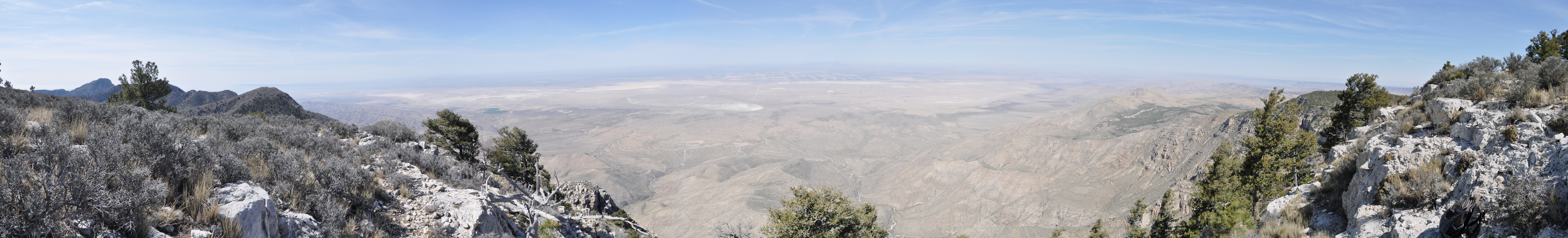
View west from the summit
