= Geography of Texas =

- Region: South Central United States
- Coordinates: 31°N 100°W
- Area
  - Total: 268,581 sq mi (695,620 km^{2})
- Coastline: 367 mi (591 km)
- Highest point: Guadalupe Peak, 8,749 feet (2,667 m)
- Lowest point: Gulf of Mexico, sea level

Texas municipalities and counties

The geography of Texas is diverse and large. Occupying about 7% of the total water and land area of the U.S., it is the second largest state after Alaska, and is the southernmost part of the Great Plains, which end in the south against the folded Sierra Madre Oriental of Mexico. Texas is in the South Central United States of America, and is considered to form part of the U.S. South and also part of the U.S. Southwest.

By residents, the state is generally divided into North Texas, East Texas, Central Texas, South Texas, West Texas and, sometimes, the Panhandle and Upper Gulf Coast, but according to the Texas Almanac, Texas has four major physical regions: Gulf Coastal Plains, Interior Lowlands, Great Plains, and Basin and Range Province. This has been cited as the difference between human geography and physical geography, although the fact that Texas was granted the prerogative to divide into as many as five U.S. states may be a historical motive for Texans defining their state as containing exactly five regions.

Some regions in Texas are more associated with the American Southeast (primarily East Texas, Central Texas, and North Texas). The Panhandle is part of the Great Plains and is considered by many to have more in common with parts of the Midwest than either the South or Southwest. Geographically and culturally, El Paso is closer to New Mexico or Arizona than it is to Austin or to East Texas. The size of Texas prohibits easy categorization of the entire state wholly in any recognized region of the United States, and even cultural diversity among regions of the state makes it difficult to treat Texas as a region in its own right.

== Physical geography ==
Texas covers a total area of 268,581 square miles (695,622 km^{2}). The longest straight-line distance is from the northwest corner of the panhandle to the Rio Grande river just below Brownsville, 801 miles (1,289 km). The greatest east–west distance is 773 miles (1,244 km) from the extreme eastward bend in the Sabine River in Newton County to the extreme western bulge of the Rio Grande just above El Paso. The largest continental state is so expansive that El Paso, in the western corner of the state, is closer to San Diego, California, than to the Houston/Beaumont area, near the Louisiana state line; while Orange, on the border with Louisiana, is closer to Jacksonville, Florida, than it is to El Paso. Texarkana, in the northeastern corner of the state, is about the same distance from Chicago, Illinois, as it is from El Paso, and Dalhart, in the northwestern corner of the state, is closer to the state capitals of Kansas, Nebraska, Colorado, New Mexico, Oklahoma and Wyoming than it is to Austin, its own state capital.

The geographic center of Texas is about 15 miles (24 km) northeast of Brady in northern McCulloch County. Guadalupe Peak, at 8,749 feet (2,666.7 m) above sea level, is the highest point in Texas, the lowest being sea level where Texas meets the Gulf of Mexico. Texas has five state forests and 120 state parks totalling over 605,000 acres (2,450 km^{2}). There are 3,700 named streams and 15 major river systems flowing through 191,000 miles (307,000 km) of Texas, supporting over 212 reservoirs.

With 10 climatic regions, 14 soil regions, and 11 distinct ecological regions, regional classification becomes problematic with differences in soils, topography, geology, rainfall, and plant and animal communities.

=== Coast and estuaries ===
Much of the 367-mile (591 km) Gulf coastline of Texas is paralleled by the Texas barrier islands, many of which enclose a series of estuaries where the state's rivers mix with water from the Gulf of Mexico. These water bodies include some of the largest and most ecologically productive coastal estuaries in the United States and contribute significantly to the ecological and economic resources of Texas.

=== Coastal Plains ===
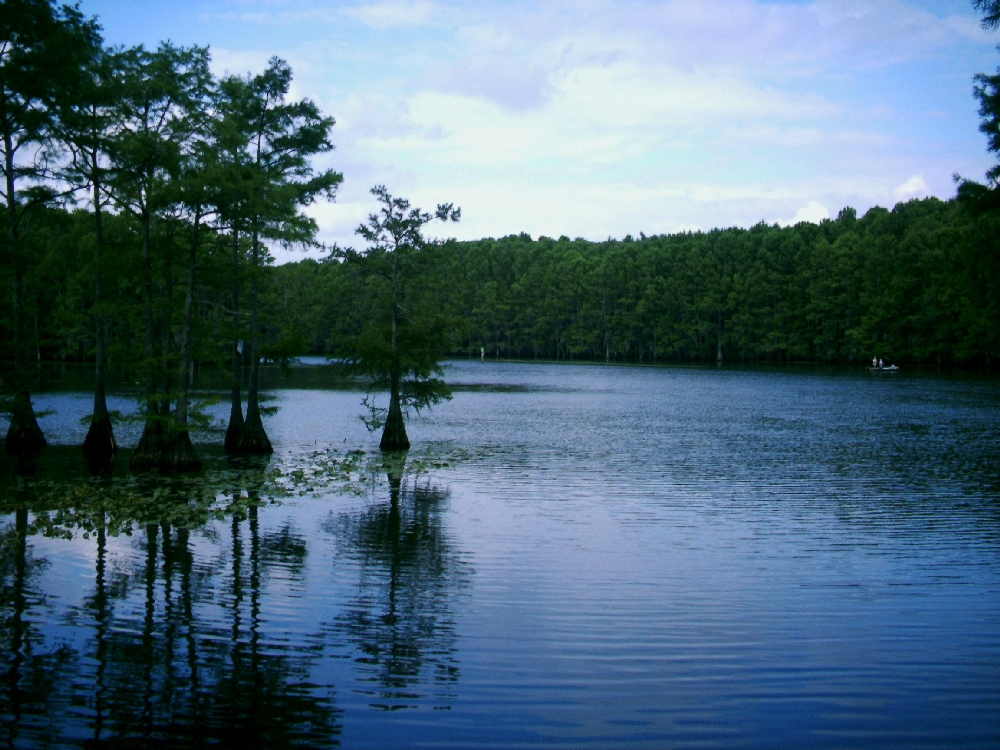
Caddo Lake

The Gulf Coastal Plains extends from the Gulf of Mexico inland to the Balcones Fault and the Eastern Cross Timbers. This large area stretches from the cities of Paris to San Antonio to Del Rio but shows a large variety in vegetation. Ranging from 20 to 58 inches (510 to 1,470 mm) of annual rainfall, this is a nearly level, drained plain dissected by streams and rivers flowing into coastal estuaries and marshes. Windblown sands and dunes, grasslands, oak mottes and salt marshes make up the seaward areas. National Parks include Big Thicket National Preserve, Padre Island National Seashore and the Palo Alto Battlefield National Historic Site.

=== North Central Plains ===
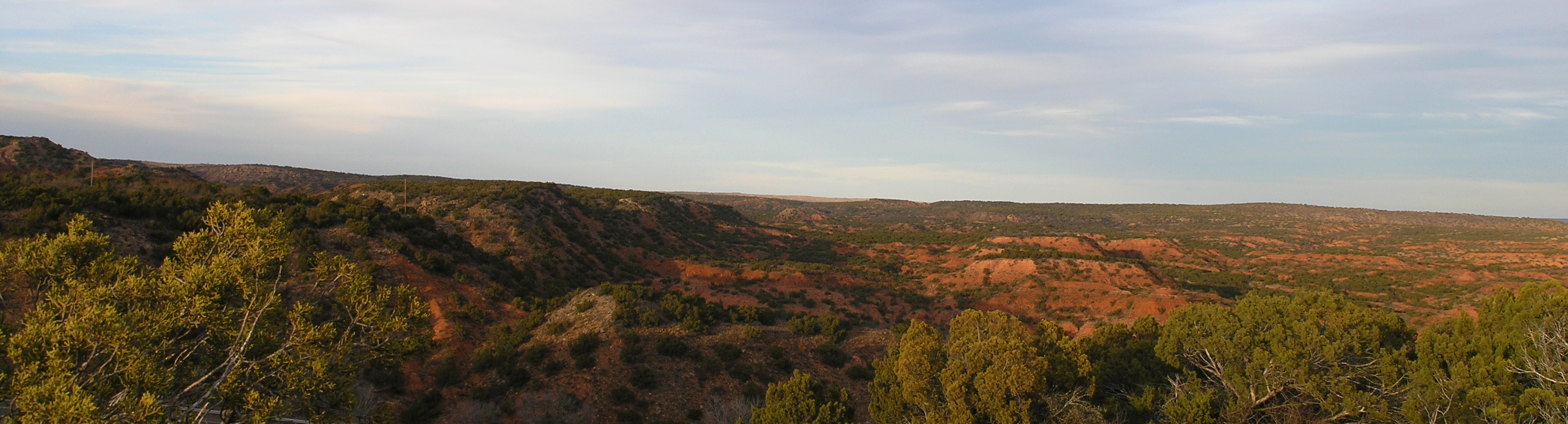
Looking north at the Caprock Escarpment

The North Central Plains are bounded by the Caprock Escarpment to the west, the Edwards Plateau to the south, and the Eastern Cross Timbers to the east. This area includes the North Central Plains around the cities of Abilene and Wichita Falls, the Western Cross Timbers to the west of Fort Worth, the Grand Prairie, and the Eastern Cross Timbers to the east of Dallas. With about 35 to 50 inches (890 to 1,270 mm) annual rainfall, gently rolling to hilly forested land is part of a larger pine-hardwood forest of oaks, hickories, elm and gum trees. Soils vary from coarse sands to tight clays or sheetrock clays and shales.

=== Great Plains ===
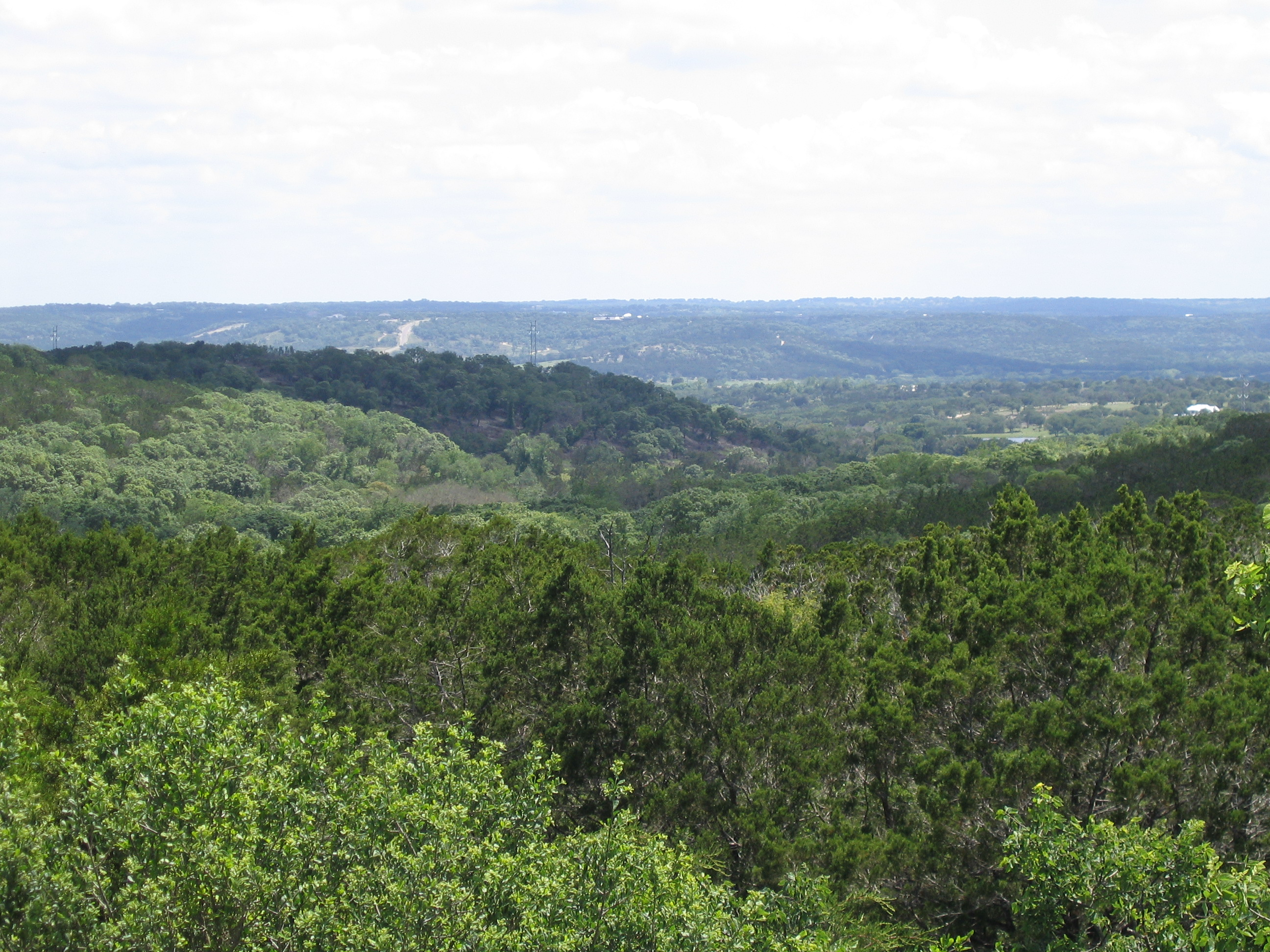
Hill Country

The Great Plains include the Llano Estacado, the Panhandle, Edwards Plateau, Toyah Basin, and the Llano Uplift. It is bordered on the east by the Caprock Escarpment in the panhandle and by the Balcones Fault to the southeast. Cities in this region include Midland and Odessa, Lubbock, and Amarillo. The Hill Country is a popular name for the area of hills along the Balcones Escarpment and is a transitional area between the Great Plains and the Gulf Coastal Plains. With about 15 to 31 inches (380 to 790 mm) annual rainfall, the southern end of the Great Plains are gently rolling plains of shrub and grassland, and home to the dramatic Caprock Canyons and Palo Duro Canyon state parks. The largest concentration of playa lakes in the world (nearly 22,000) is on the Southern High Plains of Texas and Eastern New Mexico.

Texas's blackland prairies were some of the first areas farmed in Texas. Highly expansive clays with characteristic dark coloration, called the Houston Black series, occur on about 1.5 million acres (6,000 km^{2}) extending from north of Dallas south to San Antonio. The Professional Soil Scientists Association of Texas has recommended to the State Legislature that the Houston Black series be designated the State soil. The series was established in 1902. National Parks in this area are the Lyndon B. Johnson National Historical Park and the San Antonio Missions National Historical Park.

=== Mountains and basins ===
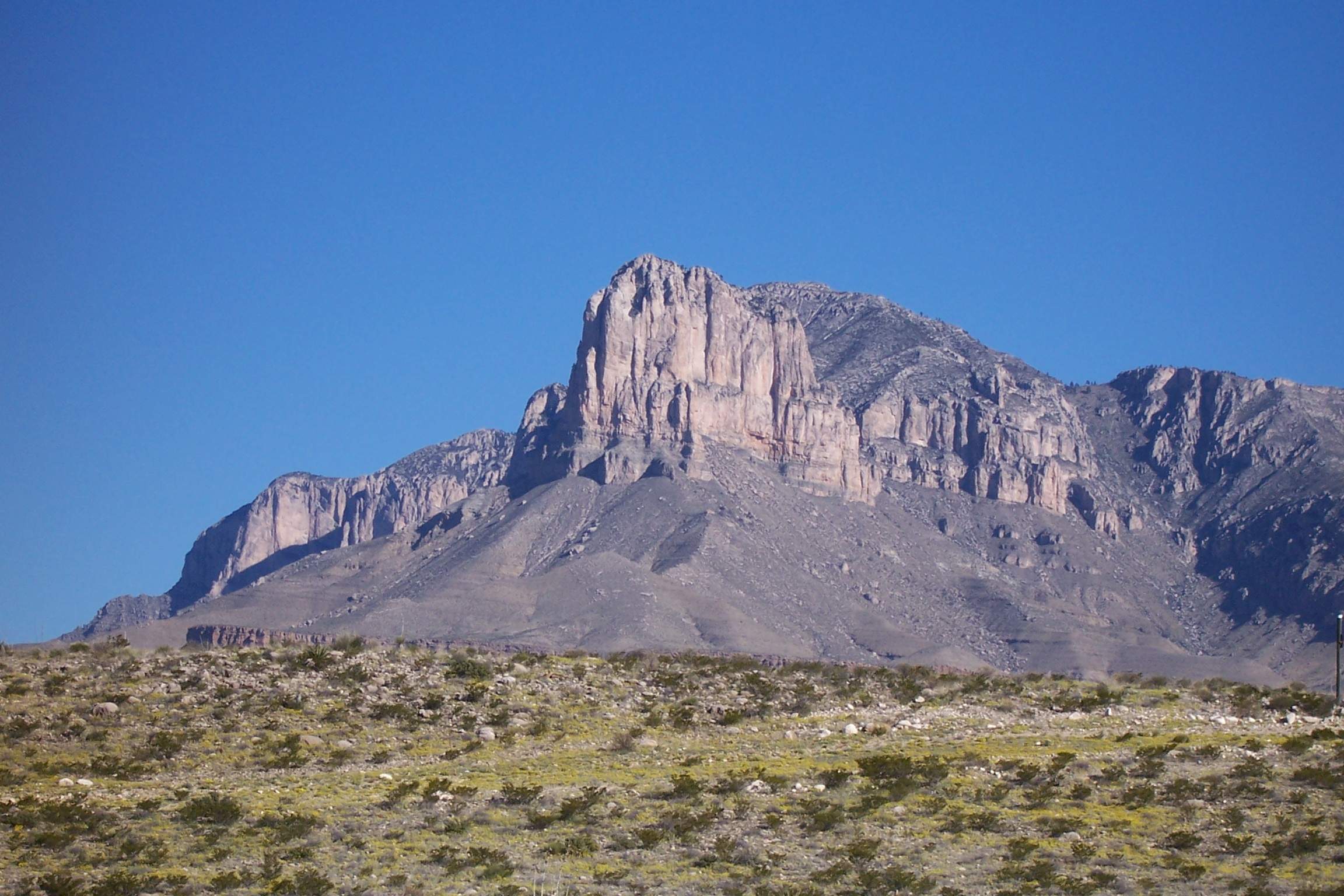
El Capitan

The Trans-Pecos Natural Region has less than 12 inches (300 mm) annual rainfall. The most complex Natural Region, it includes Sand Hills, the Stockton Plateau, desert valleys, wooded mountain slopes and desert grasslands. The Basin and Range Province is in West Texas, west of the Pecos River, beginning with the Davis Mountains on the east and the Rio Grande to its west and south. The Trans-Pecos region is the only part of Texas regarded as mountainous and includes seven named peaks in elevation greater than 8,000 feet (2,400 m). This region includes sand hills, desert valleys, wooded mountain slopes and desert grasslands.

The vegetation diversity includes at least 268 grass species and 447 species of woody plants. National Parks include the Amistad National Recreation Area, Big Bend National Park, Chamizal National Memorial, Fort Davis National Historic Site, Guadalupe Mountains National Park, and the Rio Grande Wild and Scenic River. This area is part of the Chihuahuan Desert.

== Climate ==
Köppen climate classification types of Texas

Continental, Mountain, and Modified Marine are the three major climatic types of Texas, with no distinguishable boundaries. Modified Marine, or subtropical, dominates the majority of the state. Texas has an annual precipitation range from 60.57 inches (1,538 mm) in Jasper County, East Texas, to 9.43 inches (240 mm) in El Paso. The record high of 120 °F (49 °C) was reached at Seymour on 12 August 1936, and Monahans on 28 June 1994. The low also ties at −23 °F (−31 °C) in Tulia on 12 February 1899, and Seminole on 8 February 1933.

== Geology ==
Texas is mostly sedimentary rocks, with East Texas underlain by a Cretaceous and younger sequence of sediments, the trace of ancient shorelines east and south until the active continental margin of the Gulf of Mexico is met. This sequence is built atop the subsided crest of the Appalachian Mountains–Ouachita Mountains–Marathon Mountains zone of Pennsylvanian continental collision, which collapsed when rifting in Jurassic time opened the Gulf of Mexico. West from this orogenic crest, which is buried beneath the Dallas–Waco–Austin–San Antonio trend, the sediments are Permian and Triassic in age. Oil is found in the Cretaceous sediments in the east, the Permian sediments in the west, and along the Gulf coast and out on the Texas continental shelf. A few exposures of Precambrian igneous and metamorphic rocks are found in the central and western parts of the state, and Oligocene volcanic rocks are found in far west Texas, in the Big Bend area. A blanket of Miocene sediments known as the Ogallala formation in the western high plains region is an important aquifer. Texas has no active or dormant volcanoes and few earthquakes, being situated far from an active plate tectonic boundary. The Big Bend area is the most seismically active; however, the area is sparsely populated and suffers minimal damages and injuries, and no known fatalities have been attributed to a Texas earthquake.

== Resources ==
With a large supply of natural resources, Texas is a major agricultural and industrial state, producing oil, cattle, sheep, and cotton. The state also produces poultry, eggs, dairy products, greenhouse and nursery products, wheat, hay, rice, sugar cane, and peanuts, and a range of fruits and vegetables.

- Asphalt-bearing rocks, mainly cretaceous limestones, occur in Bexar, Burnet, Kinney, Uvalde, and other counties.
- Cement is produced in Bexar, Comal, Dallas, Ector, Ellis, El Paso, Harris, Hays, McLennan, Nolan, Nueces, Potter, and Tarrant counties. Historically, Texas' Portland cement output accounts for about 10% of the annual United States production.
- With an abundance of various types of clays, Texas is one of the leading producers of clays.
- Bituminous coal occurs primarily in Coleman, Eastland, Erath, Jack, McCulloch, Montague, Palo Pinto, Parker, Throckmorton, Wise, and Young counties of Texas. Lignite, or brown coal, occurs in deposits in the Texas Coastal Plain.
- Fluorspar or fluorite is an important industrial mineral used in the manufacture of steel, aluminum, glass, and fluorocarbons. It occurs at several localities in the Trans-Pecos and Llano regions of Texas.
- Collecting gemstone rock and mineral specimens has proved quite profitable. Agate, jasper, cinnabar, fluorite, topaz, calcite, opal, petrified wood, and tektites are all commonly collected.
- Deposits of graphite occur in the Llano region and was previously produced in Burnet County.
- Bat guano occurs in numerous caverns in the Edwards Plateau and in the Trans-Pecos region and to a more limited extent in Central Texas.
- Gypsum is extensively developed in Texas where the main occurrences are in the Permian Basin, the Cretaceous Edwards Formation in Gillespie and Menard counties, and the Gulf Coast salt domes of Harris County and previously Brooks County.
- Texas is the leading producer of helium solely from the Cliffside gas field near Amarillo.
- Deposits of iron ore are present in northeastern Texas as well as several in Central Texas.
- Elements of the Lanthanide series are commonly termed rare-earth elements. Several of the rare earths have anomalous concentrations in the rhyolitic and related igneous rocks in the Trans-Pecos area of Texas. A deposit containing several rare-earth minerals was exposed at Barringer Hill in Llano County before it was covered by the waters of Lake Buchanan.
- Limestones, abundant in many parts of Texas, are used in the manufacture of lime. Plants for the production of lime are operating in Bexar, Bosque, Burnet, Comal, Deaf Smith, Hill, Johnson, Nueces, and Travis counties.
- Magnesium chloride, magnesium sulfate and other mineral salts are present in the Upper Permian Basin and in the underlying playas of the High Plains.
- Manganese is known to occur in Precambrian rocks in Mason and Llano counties, in Val Verde County, in Jeff Davis County, and in Dickens County.
- Mica is present in Precambrian pegmatite in the Llano region.
- Common opal occurs on the Texas Coastal Plain.
- Salts occurs in large quantities in salt domes in the Texas Coastal Plain and with other evaporites in the Permian Basin of West Texas, as well as near Grand Saline, Texas.
- Sands used for industrial purposes commonly have been found in the Texas Coastal Plains, East Texas, north central Texas, and Central Texas; and sand mines have opened in the Shinnery (dunes) ecosystem of northern West Texas and the eastern part of the West Wingtip.
- The discovery of silver in Texas has been credited by some to Franciscans who discovered and operated mines near El Paso about 1680. Documented silver production started in the late 1880s at the Presidio Mine, in Presidio County. Texas produced 32,663,405 troy ounces of silver between 1885 and 1955.
- Sulfur occurs in the caprocks of salt domes in the Gulf Coastal Plain, in Permian-age bedded deposits in Trans-Pecos Texas.
- In the past, uranium was produced from surface mines in Atascosa, Gonzales, Karnes, and Live Oak counties. All uranium mines are closed and Texas is no longer a producer.
- The Barnett Shale, located in the Fort Worth basin, has gained attention in recent years as a source of natural gas. Controversy regarding drilling and exploration rights is an issue.

== Regions ==
There are several different methods used to describe the geographic and geological differences within the state, and there are often subdivisions within a region which more accurately describe both the terrain and the culture. Because there is no single standard for subdividing the regions of Texas, many accepted areas either overlap or seem to contradict others. All are included for completeness.

1. High Plains (Lubbock and Amarillo) – Lubbock, Randall, Potter, Hale, Moore, Hockley, Gray, Hutchinson, Deaf Smith, Lamb, Terry, Ochiltree, Parmer, Yoakum, Dallam, Castro, Bailey, Swisher, Childress, Lynn, Carson, Floyd, Crosby, Hansford, Hartley, Wheeler, Garza, Donley, Hemphill, Lipscomb, Hall, Sherman, Collingsworth, Cochran, Oldham, Armstrong, Dickens, Briscoe, Motley, Roberts, King
2. Northwest (Abilene and Wichita Falls) – Taylor, Wichita, Brown, Montague, Jones, Eastland, Young, Scurry, Callahan, Comanche, Nolan, Wilbarger, Clay, Runnels, Stephens, Jack, Archer, Mitchell, Coleman, Haskell, Fisher, Baylor, Hardeman, Knox, Shackelford, Throckmorton, Cottle, Stonewall, Foard, Kent
3. Metroplex (Dallas and Fort Worth) – Dallas, Tarrant, Collin, Denton, Ellis, Johnson, Kaufman, Parker, Grayson, Rockwall, Hunt, Wise, Hood, Navarro, Erath, Cooke, Fannin, Palo Pinto, Somervell
4. Upper East (Tyler) – Smith, Gregg, Bowie, Henderson, Harrison, Van Zandt, Anderson, Rusk, Cherokee, Lamar, Wood, Upshur, Hopkins, Titus, Cass, Panola, Rains, Camp, Morris, Red River, Franklin, Marion, Delta
5. Southeast (Beaumont) – Jefferson, Angelina, Orange, Nacogdoches, Hardin, Polk, Jasper, San Jacinto, Shelby, Houston, Tyler, Trinity, Newton, Sabine, San Augustine
6. Central (Killeen, Waco and College Station) – Bell, McLennan, Brazos, Coryell, Hill, Washington, Grimes, Milam, Lampasas, Limestone, Freestone, Burleson, Bosque, Falls, Robertson, Leon, Madison, Hamilton, San Saba, Mills
7. Gulf Coast (Houston) – Harris, Fort Bend, Montgomery, Brazoria, Galveston, Liberty, Walker, Waller, Chambers, Wharton, Matagorda, Austin, Colorado
8. Capital (Austin) – Travis, Williamson, Hays, Bastrop, Burnet, Caldwell, Fayette, Llano, Lee, Blanco
9. Alamo (San Antonio) – Bexar, Comal, Guadalupe, Medina, Wilson, Kerr, Atascosa, Kendall, Gillespie, Bandera, Frio, Karnes
10. West Texas (Midland and Odessa) – Midland, Ector, Tom Green, Howard, Gaines, Andrews, Pecos, Reeves, Dawson, Ward, McCulloch, Winkler, Martin, Crane, Kimble, Mason, Coke, Concho, Sutton, Reagan, Upton, Crockett, Schleicher, Menard, Irion, Sterling, Glasscock, Terrell, Borden, Loving
11. Coastal Bend (Corpus Christi) – Nueces, Victoria, San Patricio, Jim Wells, Bee, Kleberg, Aransas, Lavaca, DeWitt, Gonzales, Calhoun, Jackson, Live Oak, Duval, Goliad, Brooks, Refugio, McMullen, Kenedy
12. South Texas Border (Laredo, Brownsville and McAllen) – Hidalgo, Cameron, Webb, Starr, Maverick, Val Verde, Uvalde, Willacy, Zapata, Zavala, Dimmit, La Salle, Jim Hogg, Kinney, Real, Edwards
13. Upper Rio Grande (El Paso) – El Paso, Brewster, Presidio, Hudspeth, Culberson, Jeff Davis

This MECE (mutually exclusive and collectively exhaustive) partition of the 254 counties into 12 economic regions is used by the Texas comptroller for various analysis and reporting purposes.

- Alamo, an economic region defined by the Texas Comptroller.
- Big Bend, a sub-region in the south of the Trans-Pecos region located along the Rio Grande.
- Blackland Prairies, an ecoregion that stretches between North Texas and the Alamo region.
- Brazos Valley, comprising seven closely related counties in Central Texas.
- Canadian River Valley, which is centered around a prominent tributary of the Arkansas River in Northwest Texas.
- Central Texas, one of the regions used by the Texas Comptroller. Central Texas overlaps with Texas Hill Country.
- Concho Valley, a sub-region of West Texas centered around the Concho River.
- Coastal Bend, which follows a curved stretch in the center of Texas's Gulf Coast. The Coastal Bend region overlaps with the Alamo region, South Texas, and the Texas Comptroller's Gulf Coast region.
- Cross Timbers
- East Texas
- Edwards Plateau
- Gulf Coast, also known as Texas Gulf Coast or Upper Gulf Coast, which can refer to either an economic region defined by the Texas Comptroller or a geographical region encompassing all of Texas's coastline on the Gulf of Mexico, or only a region roughly corresponding with Greater Houston.
- Llano Estacado
- North Texas
- Northeast Texas
- Northwest Texas, an economic region defined by the Texas Comptroller.
- Permian Basin
- Piney Woods
- Red River Valley
- Rio Grande Valley
- South Plains The vernacular term 'South Plains' is part of Llano Estacado, listed above.
- South Texas
- Southeast Texas
- Texas Hill Country
- Texas Panhandle, known to the Texas Comptroller as the High Plains. The region is sometimes defined as only the 26 northernmost counties that are on latitude with Oklahoma.
- Texas Urban Triangle
- Trans-Pecos
- West Texas

=== Geographical regions that extend into Texas ===
- Southwestern United States
- Southern United States
- Deep South
- Black Belt
- Great Plains
- Chihuahuan Desert
- High Plains
- Piney Woods

== See also ==
- List of rivers of Texas
- List of lakes in Texas
- List of regions of the United States
- List of ecoregions in the United States (EPA)
