= Bee Mountain (Texas) =

Mountain in Texas, United States

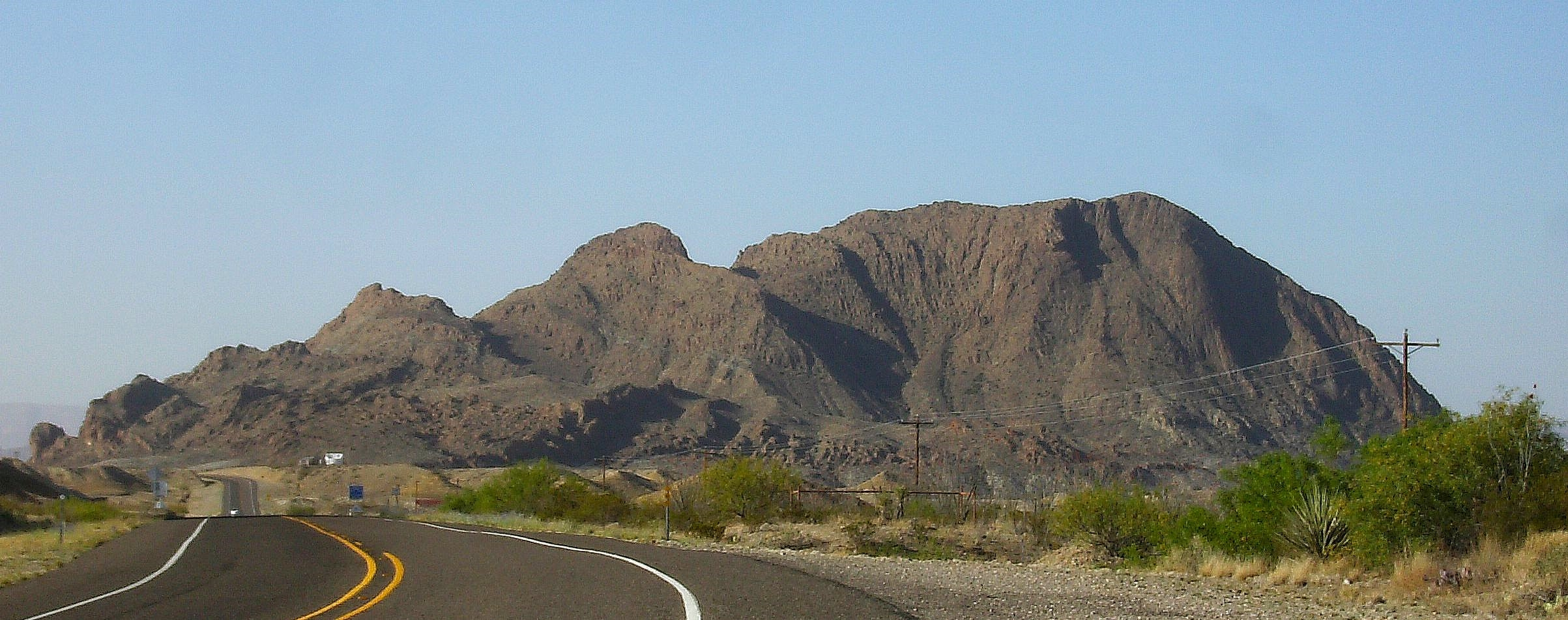
- North aspect

Highest point
- Elevation: 3,460 ft (1,055 m)
- Prominence: 729 ft (222 m)
- Parent peak: Willow Mountain (3,826 ft)
- Isolation: 2.18 mi (3.51 km)
- Coordinates: 29°20′33″N 103°32′25″W

Naming
- Etymology: Bee

Geography
- Location within Texas Location within the United States
- Country: United States
- State: Texas
- County: Brewster
- Parent range: Christmas Mountains
- Topo map: USGS Terlingua

Geology
- Rock age: Oligocene
- Mountain type: Volcanic plug
- Rock type: Igneous rock
- Volcanic arc: Trans-Pecos Volcanic Field

Bee Mountain is a 3,460-foot-elevation (1,055-meter) summit in Brewster County, Texas, United States.

== Description ==
Bee Mountain is set the Chihuahuan Desert less than two miles outside the boundary of Big Bend National Park where it is a landmark seen from Highway 118 which skirts the eastern base of the peak. The mountain is a soda microsyenite volcanic plug which formed 34 million years ago when it intruded three Late Cretaceous marine sedimentary formations which included the Boquillas Formation and the Pen Formation. Based on the Köppen climate classification, Bee Mountain is located in a hot arid climate zone with hot summers and mild winters. Any scant precipitation runoff from the mountain's slopes drains to the Rio Grande via Bens Hole Creek and Terlingua Creek. Although modest in elevation, topographic relief is significant as the summit rises 860 feet (262 m) above Bens Hole Creek in 0.35 mile (0.56 km). The mountain's toponym has been officially adopted by the United States Board on Geographic Names, and has been listed in publications since at least 1904. The name is attributed to native bees which would build their once numerous hives in crevices on the sides of the mountain before settlers eventually destroyed them to collect honey.

== See also ==
- List of mountain peaks of Texas
- Geography of Texas
