= Cerro de las Burras =

Mountain in Texas, United States

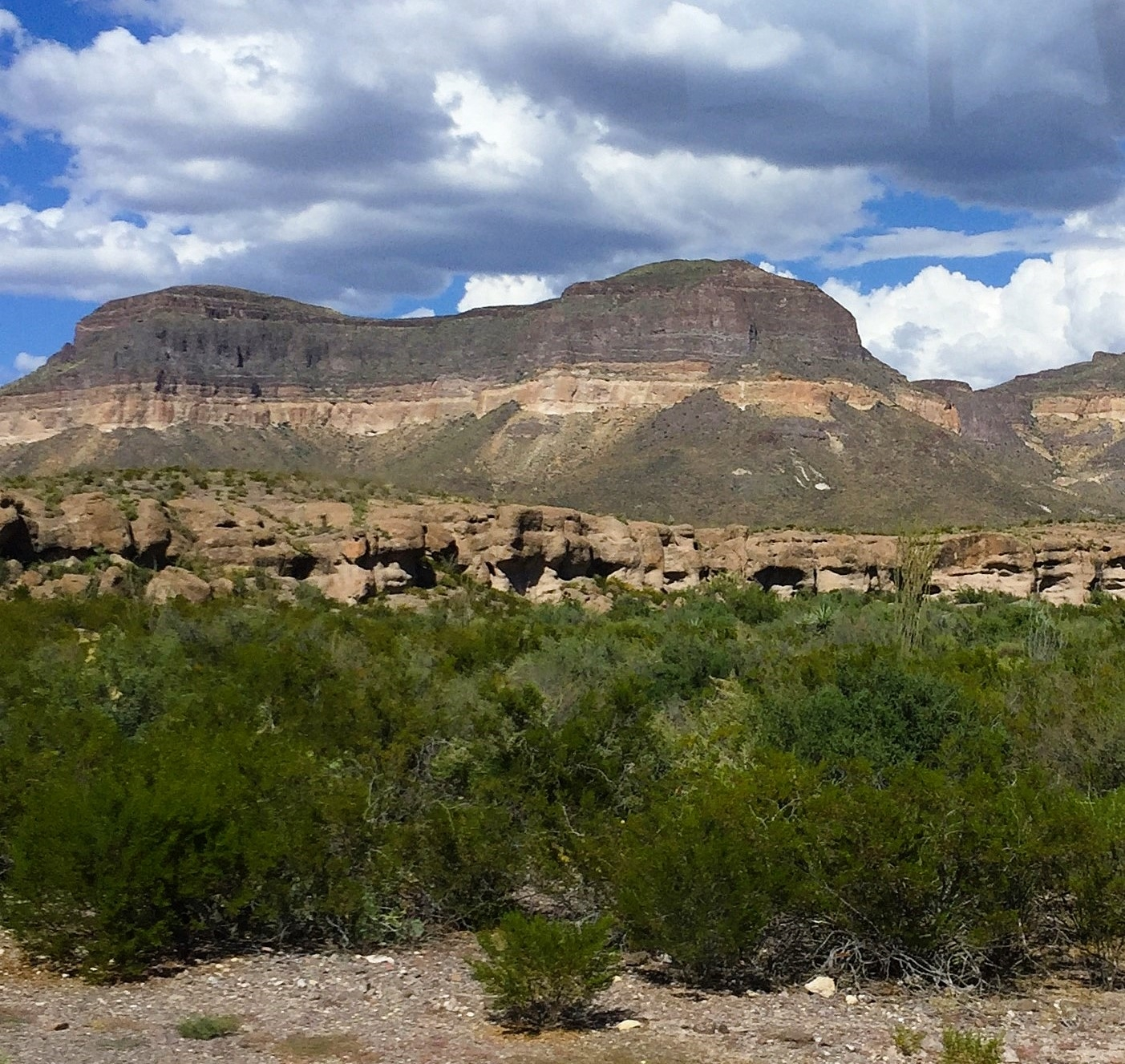
- South aspect

Highest point
- Elevation: 4,349 ft (1,326 m)
- Prominence: 246 ft (75 m)
- Isolation: 1.25 mi (2.01 km)
- Coordinates: 29°24′35″N 104°06′35″W

Naming
- Etymology: Donkey Hill

Geography
- Location within Texas Location within the United States
- Country: United States
- State: Texas
- County: Presidio
- Protected area: Big Bend Ranch State Park
- Parent range: Bofecillos Mountains
- Topo map: USGS Agua Adentro Mountain

Geology
- Rock age: Oligocene (27 Ma)
- Rock type: Igneous rock
- Volcanic arc: Trans-Pecos Volcanic Field

Cerro de las Burras is a 4,349-foot-elevation (1,326-meter) summit in Presidio County, Texas, United States.

== Description ==
Cerro de las Burras is set in Big Bend Ranch State Park and the Chihuahuan Desert. The mountain is composed of 27.1 Ma basalt and tuff, overlaying 32 Ma conglomerate and sandstone. Charles Christopher Parry walked to this mountain on August 24, 1852, during the United States and Mexican Boundary Survey. Based on the Köppen climate classification, the mountain is located in a hot arid climate zone with hot summers and mild winters. Any scant precipitation runoff from the peak's slopes drains to the Rio Grande which is two miles (3.2 km) to the south. Topographic relief is significant as the summit rises 1,870 feet (570 m) above the river in two miles (3.2 km). The mountain's toponym has been officially adopted by the United States Board on Geographic Names. The mountain's Spanish name translates as "Jenny Hill" as in jenny, a female donkey.

== See also ==
- Geography of Texas
- Leyva Canyon Volcano
