= Three Dike Hill =

Mountain in Texas, United States

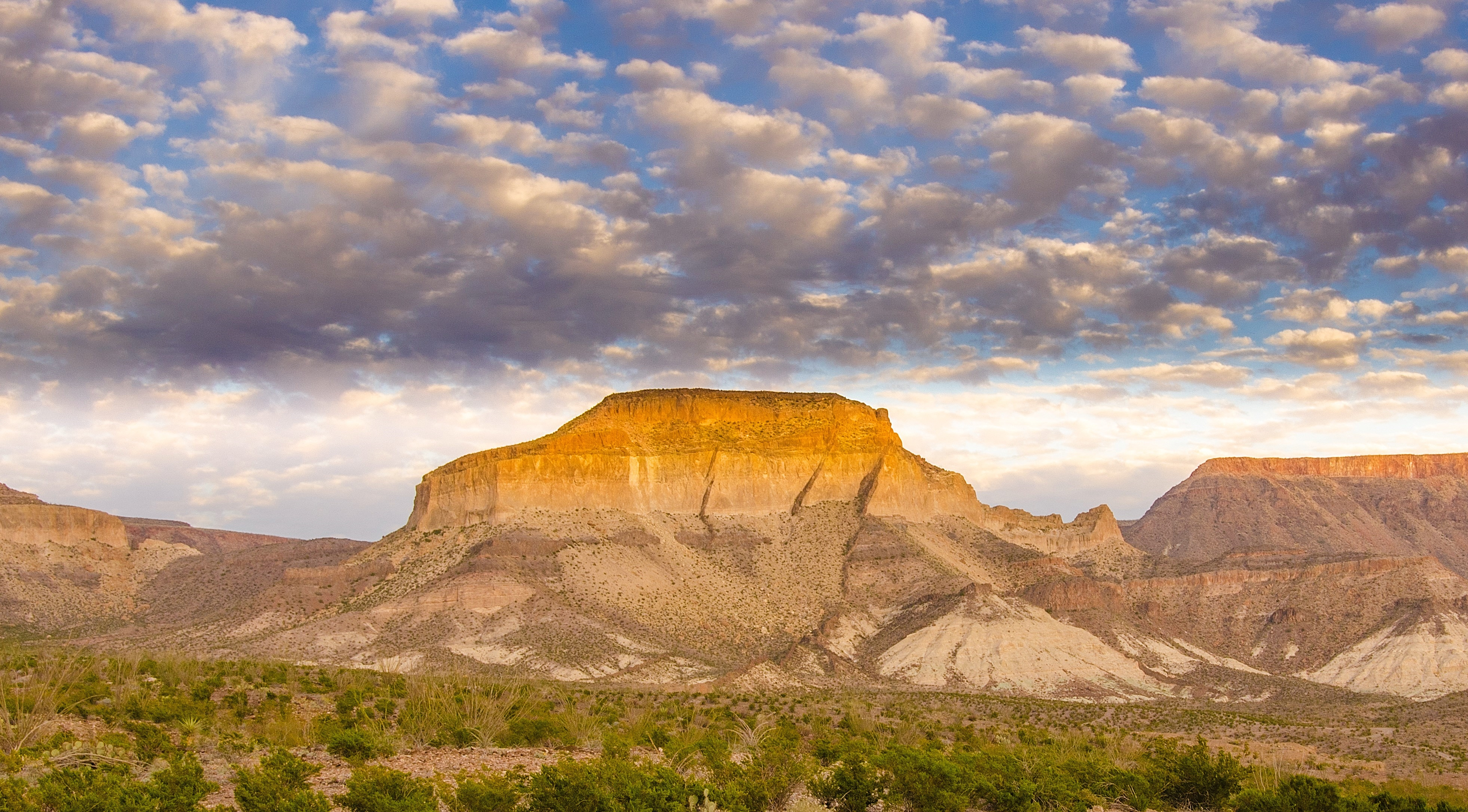
- West aspect

Highest point
- Elevation: 3,430 ft (1,045 m)
- Prominence: 410 ft (125 m)
- Isolation: 2.21 mi (3.56 km)
- Coordinates: 29°22′57″N 104°05′46″W

Geography
- Location within Texas Location within the United States
- Country: United States
- State: Texas
- County: Presidio
- Protected area: Big Bend Ranch State Park
- Parent range: Bofecillos Mountains
- Topo map: USGS Agua Adentro Mountain

Geology
- Rock age: Oligocene (27 Ma)
- Mountain type: Butte
- Rock type: Igneous rock
- Volcanic arc: Trans-Pecos Volcanic Field

Three Dike Hill is a 3,430-foot-elevation (1,045-meter) summit in Presidio County, Texas, United States.

== Description ==
Three Dike Hill is a butte set in Big Bend Ranch State Park and the Chihuahuan Desert. The top of the butte is a caprock of basalt with three dark dikes of basalt rising up through layers of tuff and sedimentary rock. Charles Christopher Parry accurately sketched this geological formation on August 26, 1852, during the United States and Mexican Boundary Survey. Based on the Köppen climate classification, the mountain is located in a hot arid climate zone with hot summers and mild winters. Any scant precipitation runoff from the peak's slopes drains to the Rio Grande which is one mile (1.6 km) to the south. Topographic relief is significant as the summit rises over 1,000 feet (305 m) above the river in three-quarters mile (1.2 km) and 800 feet (244 m) above Tapado Canyon in one-half mile (0.8 km). The mountain's toponym has not been officially adopted by the United States Board on Geographic Names.

== Gallery ==
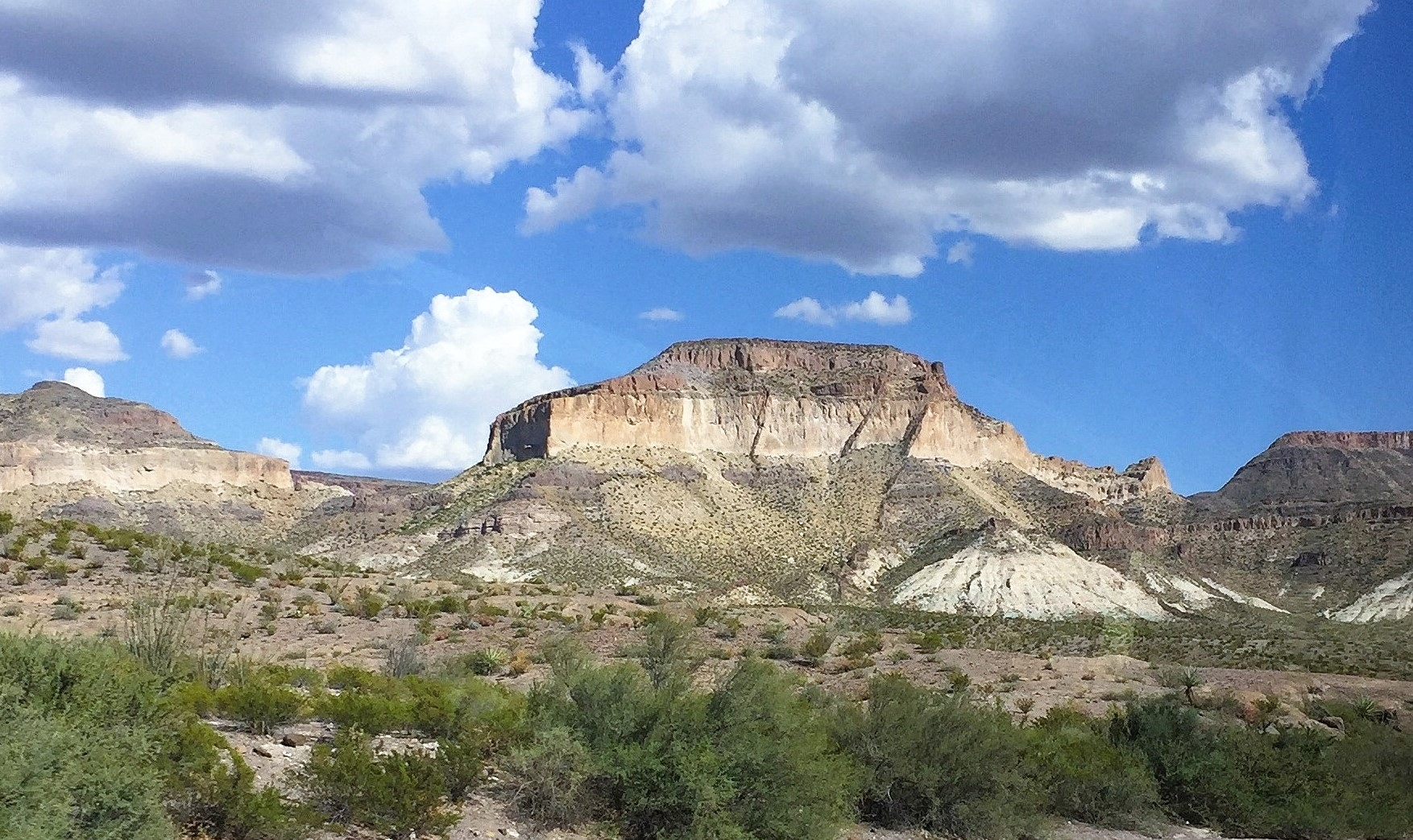
Three Dike Hill

== See also ==
- Geography of Texas
- Leyva Canyon Volcano
