= Packsaddle Mountain =

Packsaddle Mountain can refer to the following mountains in the United States:

- Packsaddle Mountain, in the Cerbat Mountains, Mohave County, Arizona
- Packsaddle Mountain (Idaho) in Bonner County
- Packsaddle Mountain (Lane County, Oregon)
- Packsaddle Mountain (Wheeler County, Oregon)
- Packsaddle Mountain (Llano County, Texas)
- Packsaddle Mountain (Brewster County, Texas)
