= Little Christmas Mountain =

Mountain in Texas, United States

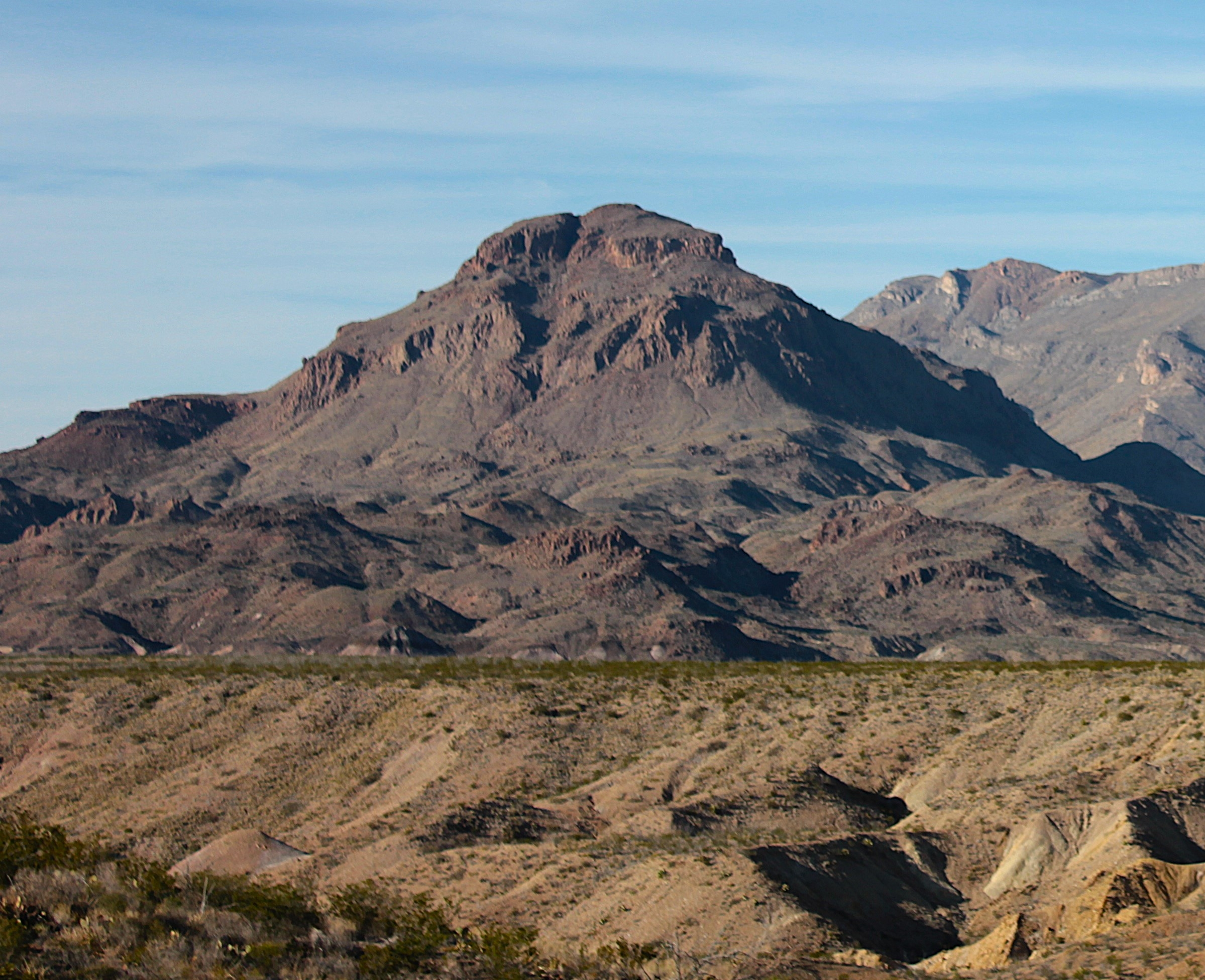
- South aspect

Highest point
- Elevation: 4,828 ft (1,472 m)
- Prominence: 1,374 ft (419 m)
- Isolation: 2.62 mi (4.22 km)
- Coordinates: 29°22′51″N 103°26′03″W

Geography
- Location within Texas Location within the United States
- Country: United States
- State: Texas
- County: Brewster
- Protected area: Big Bend National Park
- Parent range: Christmas Mountains
- Topo map: USGS Christmas Mountains

Geology
- Rock age: Oligocene
- Rock type: Igneous rock (Rhyolite)

Little Christmas Mountain is a 4,828-foot-elevation (1,472-meter) summit in Brewster County, Texas, United States.

== Description ==
Little Christmas Mountain is part of the Christmas Mountains where it is set within Big Bend National Park and the Chihuahuan Desert. The mountain is composed of intrusive rhyolite (volcanic rock) which formed 33 million years ago during the Oligocene period. Based on the Köppen climate classification, the mountain is located in a hot arid climate zone with hot summers and mild winters. Any scant precipitation runoff from the peak's slopes drains into Rough Run → Terlingua Creek → Rio Grande. Topographic relief is significant as the summit rises 1,600 feet (488 m) above Rough Run in one mile (1.6 km). The mountain's toponym was officially adopted on March 9, 1939, by the United States Board on Geographic Names.

== See also ==
- List of mountain peaks of Texas
- Geography of Texas
