= Tule Mountain =

Mountain in Texas, United States

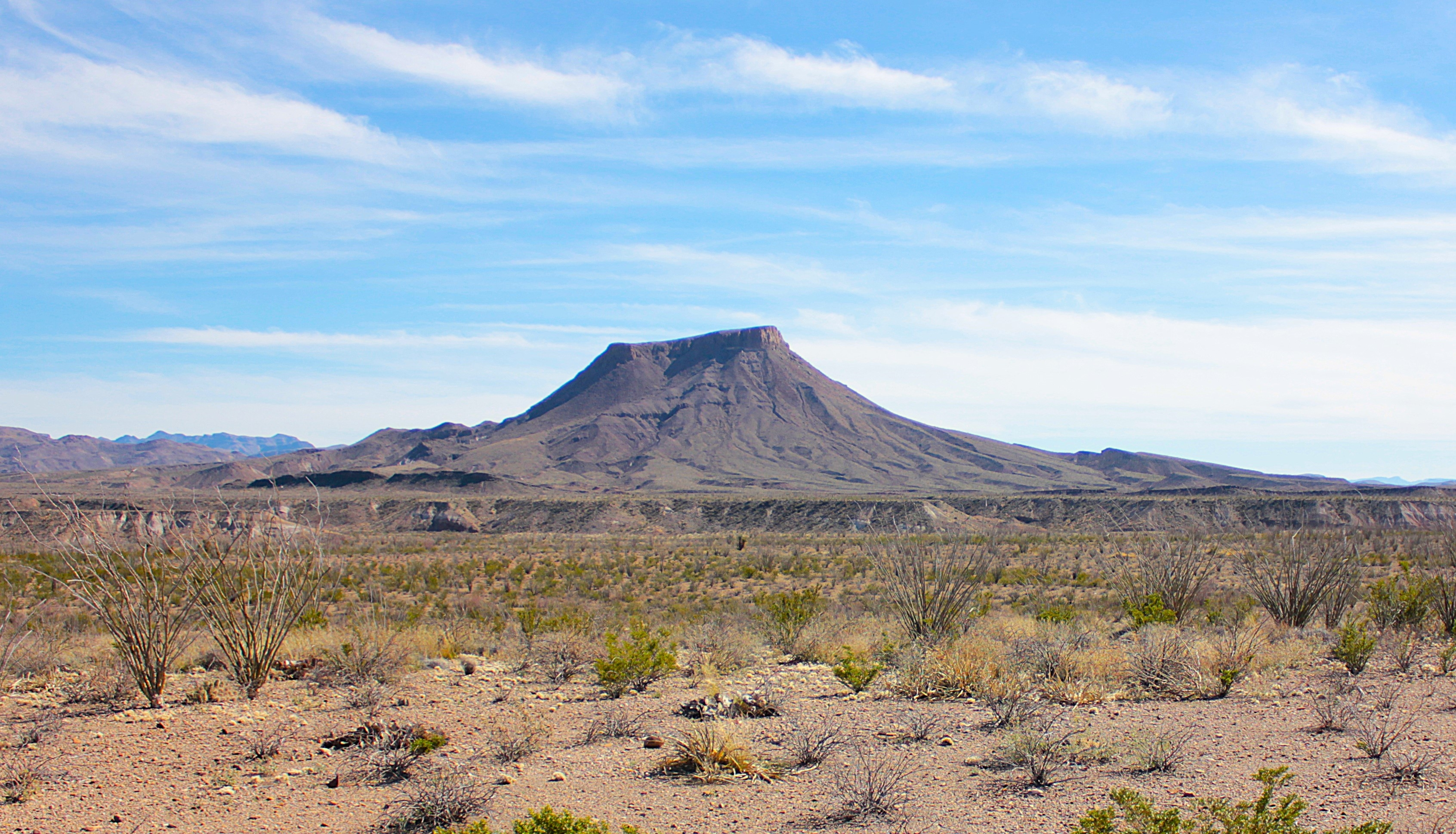
- North aspect

Highest point
- Elevation: 3,825 ft (1,166 m)
- Prominence: 848 ft (258 m)
- Parent peak: Burro Mesa
- Isolation: 3.13 mi (5.04 km)
- Coordinates: 29°15′52″N 103°28′37″W

Naming
- Etymology: Tule

Geography
- Location within Texas Location within the United States
- Country: United States
- State: Texas
- County: Brewster
- Protected area: Big Bend National Park
- Parent range: Chisos Mountains
- Topo map: USGS Tule Mountain

Geology
- Rock age: Eocene
- Rock type: Igneous rock

Tule Mountain is a 3,825-foot-elevation (1,166-meter) summit in Brewster County, Texas, United States.

== Description ==
Tule Mountain is part of the Chisos Mountains where it is set in Big Bend National Park and the Chihuahuan Desert. Based on the Köppen climate classification, the mountain is located in a hot arid climate zone with hot summers and mild winters. This climate supports plants on the slopes such as live oak, piñon pine, juniper, and grasses. Any scant precipitation runoff from the peak's slopes drains into Alamo Creek which is tributary of the Rio Grande. Topographic relief is modest as the summit rises 1,200 feet (366 m) above Alamo Creek in 1.5 mile (2.4 km). The mountain's toponym has been officially adopted by the United States Board on Geographic Names.

== Geology ==
The mountain is composed of volcanic rock which formed 33–42 million years ago during the late Eocene Epoch. The volcanic rocks exposed at Tule Mountain in stratigraphic order are Chisos tuffs, Ash Spring Basalt, Chisos tuffs and conglomerates, Mule Ear Spring Tuff, and Tule Mountain Trachyandesite at the top which is dated at 33 Ma.

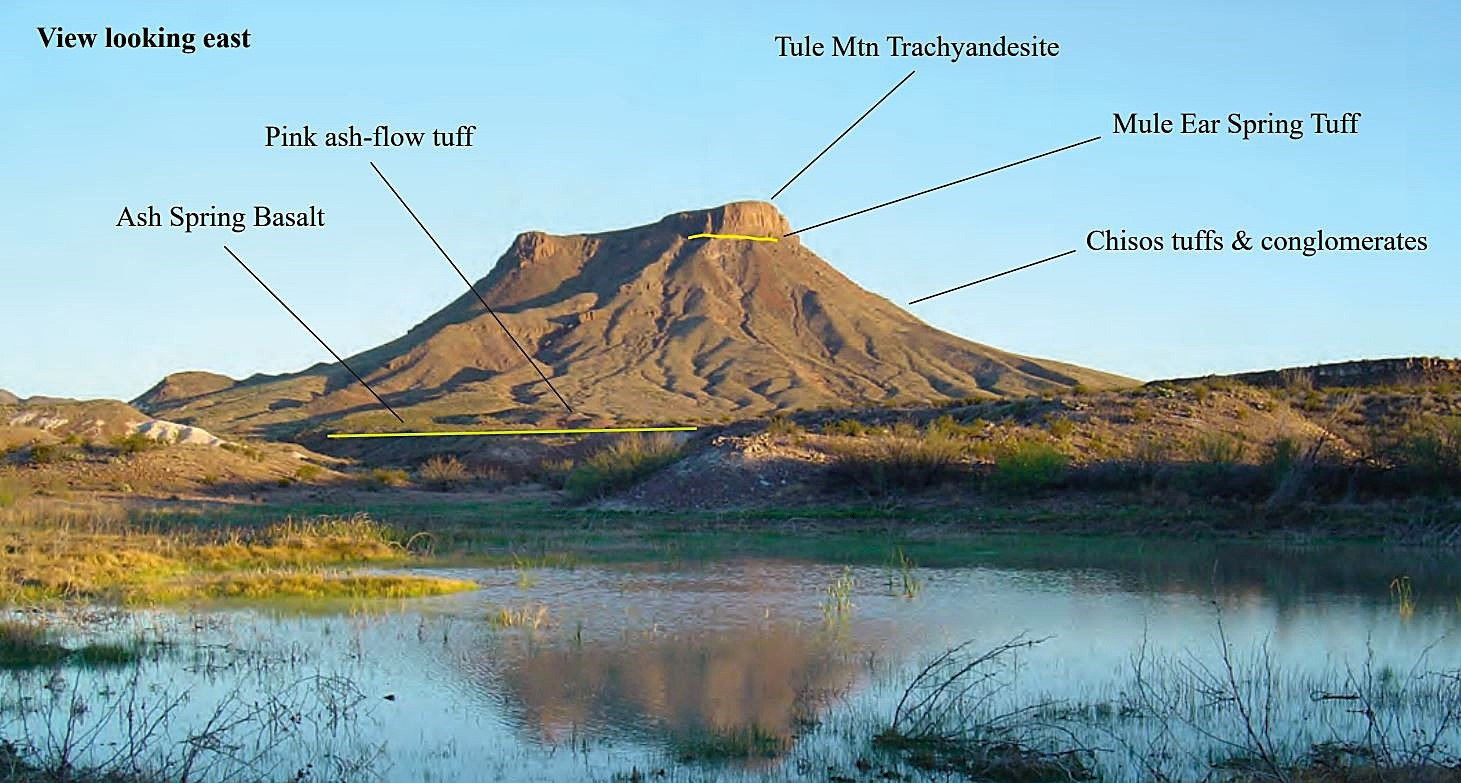
Tule Mountain

== See also ==
- List of mountain peaks of Texas
- Geography of Texas
