= Willow Mountain =

Mountain in Texas, United States

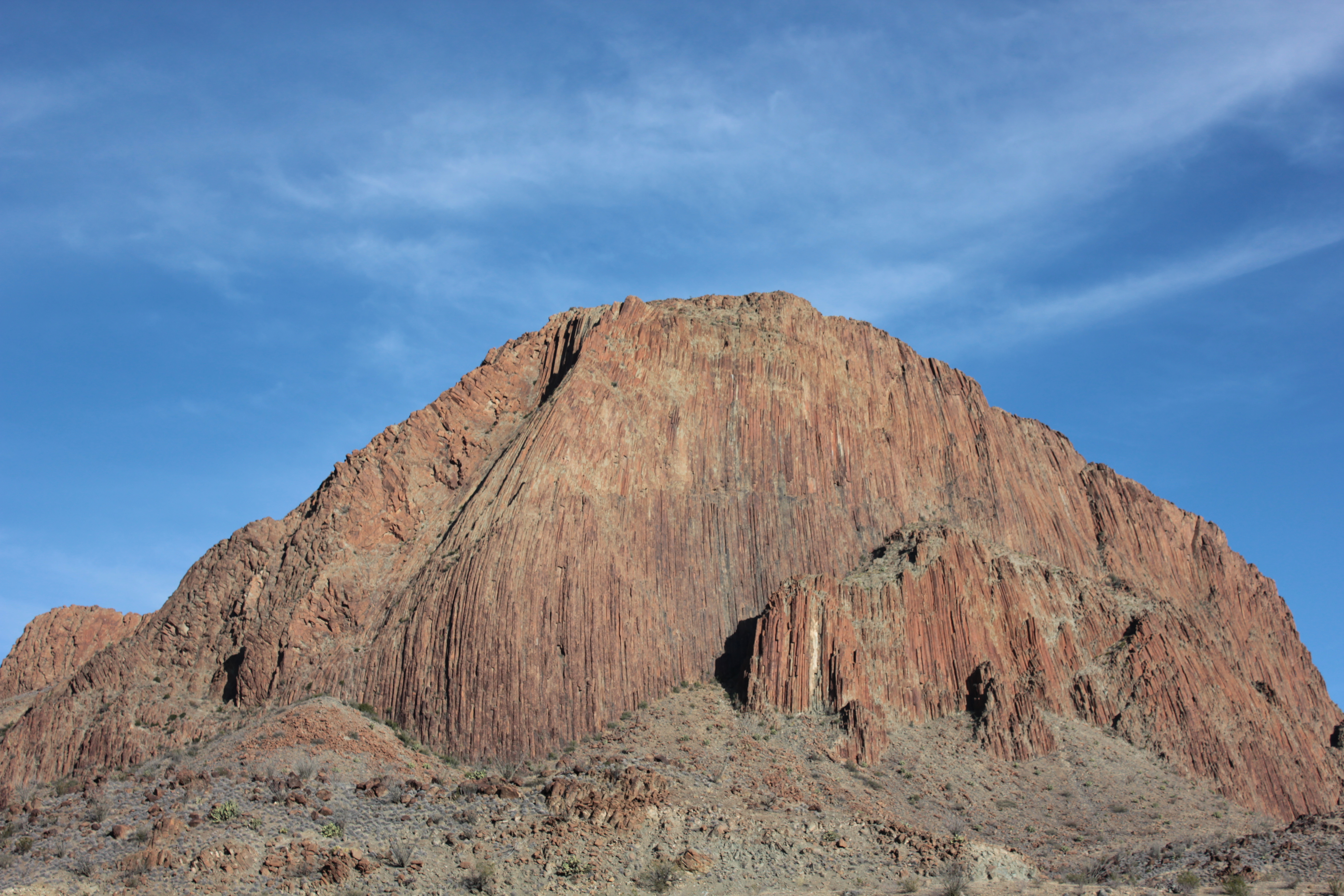
- Southwest aspect

Highest point
- Elevation: 3,826 ft (1,166 m)
- Prominence: 824 ft (251 m)
- Parent peak: Wildhorse Mountain (3,980 ft)
- Isolation: 2.63 mi (4.23 km)
- Coordinates: 29°21′55″N 103°30′57″W

Geography
- Location within Texas Location within the United States
- Country: United States
- State: Texas
- County: Brewster
- Parent range: Christmas Mountains
- Topo map: USGS Terlingua

Geology
- Rock age: Eocene
- Mountain type: Volcanic plug
- Rock type: Igneous rock

Willow Mountain is a 3,826-foot-elevation (1,166-meter) summit in Brewster County, Texas, United States.

== Description ==
Willow Mountain is set in the Christmas Mountains and the Chihuahuan Desert. The mountain is composed of 43-million-year-old volcanic rock which formed columnar jointing as displayed on the west face. Although modest in elevation, topographic relief is significant as the summit rises 1,000 feet (305 m) above Highway 118 in one-half mile (0.8 km). Based on the Köppen climate classification, Willow Mountain is located in a hot arid climate zone with hot summers and mild winters. Any scant precipitation runoff from the mountain's slopes drains to the Rio Grande via Bens Hole Creek and Terlingua Creek. The mountain's toponym has been officially adopted by the United States Board on Geographic Names, and has been listed in publications since at least 1904. The mountain may be named in association with Willow Spring at the south base of the mountain where the spring supports desert willows.

== Geology ==
Willow Mountain is the most spectacular display of rock joints in the southern Big Bend area. The mountain mass is an intrusive plug, which cooled below the surface and was subsequently uncovered by erosion. On cooling, the rock mass contracted and was uniformly jointed. After erosion uncovered this mass, weathering and erosion removed the soft areas to expose the joint pattern.

== See also ==
- List of mountain peaks of Texas
- Geography of Texas

== Gallery ==
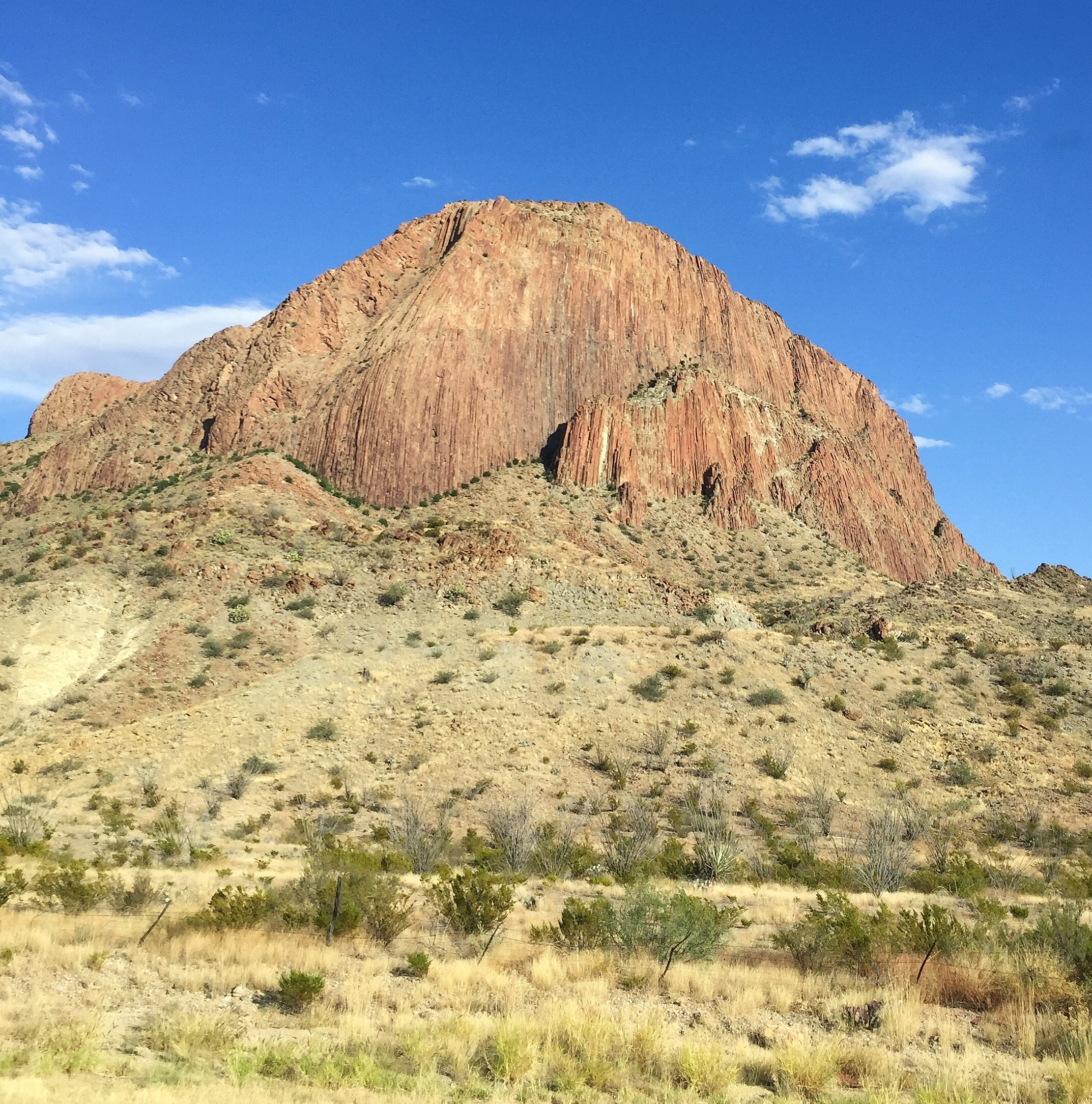
Southwest aspect

Southwest aspect
