= Leyva Canyon Volcano =

Extinct volcano in Texas

The Leyva Canyon Volcano is an extinct trachyte shield volcano located in Big Bend Ranch State Park in western Presidio County, Texas. Last erupted in the Oligocene (27.3- 27.1 Ma), the volcano is composed mostly of trachyte, rhyolite pyroclastic flows, lava dome fragments, and lahars, which all erupted from numerous vents around a main central caldera near the central of the Bofecillos Mountains. The volcano is associated with the Trans-Pecos Volcanic Field.

Leyva Canyon Volcano is one of six volcanoes that form the Bofecillos Mountains Volcanic Complex, and is the oldest of the felsic volcanoes in the complex, with the Fresno Shield Volcano being the oldest, dating at 32–29 Ma. The pyroclastic flows associated with the Leyva Canyon Volcano are high in silica and very explosive in nature, being composed of peraluminous high silica rhyolite and peralkaline quartz trachyte.

The formation of the Leyva Canyon Volcano began with the eruption of rhyolite along a small fissure near the central vent, flowing south to southwest. This was followed by an ash flow eruption that flowed in the same direction. Near the Guale Mesa, Cerro de las Burras, and Three Dike Hill, this ash flow tuff was 24 to 27.5 meters thick. The ash flow gradually thinned out near the Botella Horst. Based on this, it was estimated to have erupted with 1 km^3 of ejecta volume, presumably rating 3–4 on the volcanic explosivity index.

Along Bofecillos Canyon, ash flow and lahar deposits were 37 meters thick with some lapilli measuring 60 cm across. Above this lapilli tuff is presumed to be air fall ash deposits.
