= Packsaddle Mountain (Brewster County, Texas) =

Mountain in Texas, United States

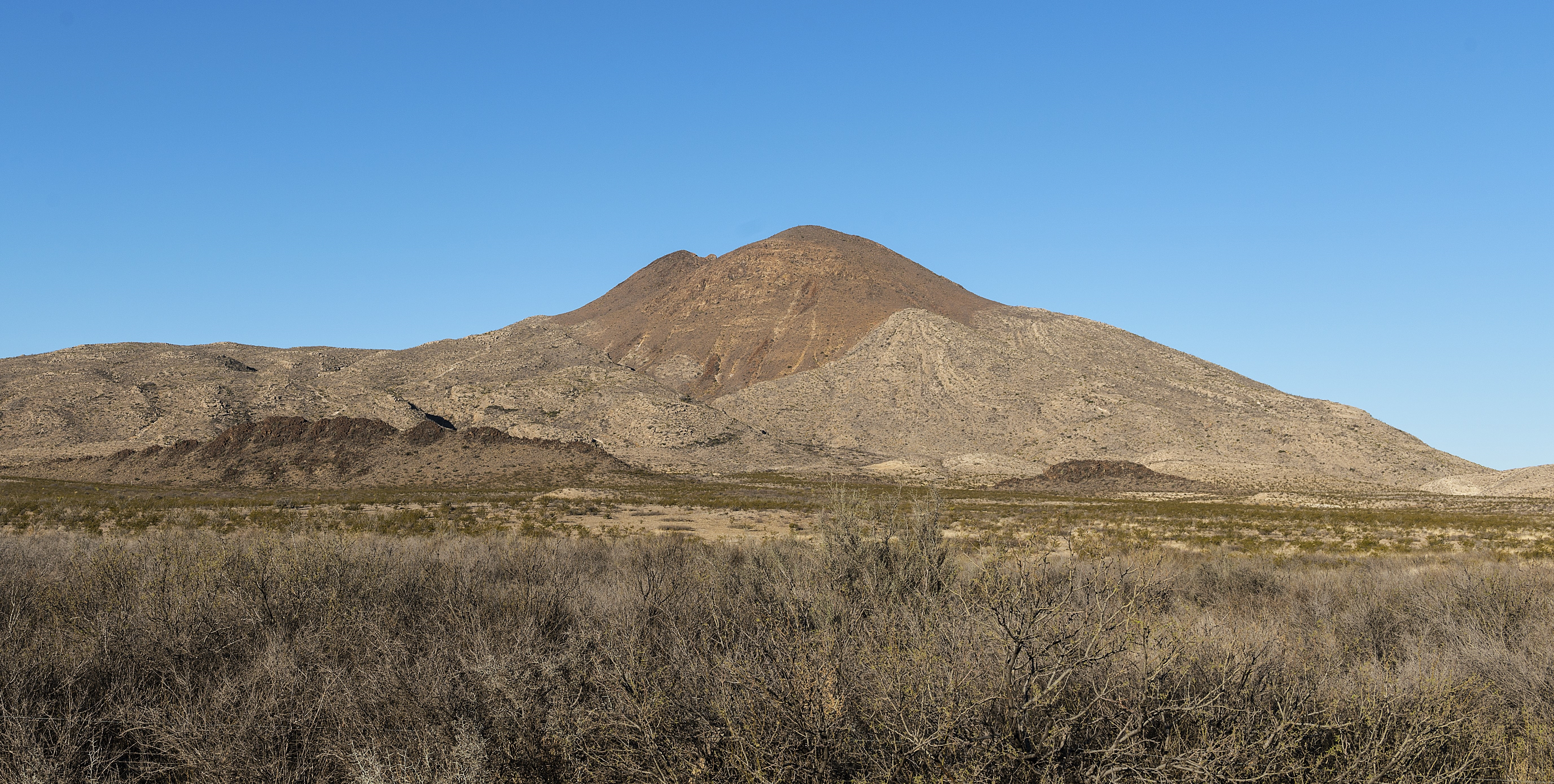
- East aspect

Highest point
- Elevation: 4,661 ft (1,421 m)
- Prominence: 1,185 ft (361 m)
- Parent peak: Hen Egg Mountain (5,005 ft)
- Isolation: 3.35 mi (5.39 km)
- Coordinates: 29°30′50″N 103°33′49″W

Naming
- Etymology: Pack saddle

Geography
- Location within Texas Location within the United States
- Country: United States
- State: Texas
- County: Brewster
- Topo map: USGS Packsaddle Mountain

Geology
- Mountain type: Laccolith
- Rock type(s): Igneous rock and Sedimentary rock
- Volcanic arc: Trans-Pecos Volcanic Field

Packsaddle Mountain is a 4,661-foot-elevation (1,421-meter) summit in Brewster County, Texas, United States.

== Description ==
Packsaddle Mountain is a laccolith set in the Chihuahuan Desert where it is a landmark along Highway 118 which skirts the eastern base of the mountain. The mountain is composed of a core of intrusive igneous rock that forced up and breached the roof of light-colored Late Cretaceous sedimentary rock of the Boquillas Formation and the Pen Formation, leaving the strata tilted around the circumference of the core. Based on the Köppen climate classification, Packsaddle Mountain is located in a hot arid climate zone with hot summers and mild winters. Any scant precipitation runoff from the mountain's east slope drains to the Rio Grande via Nine Point Draw, whereas the other slopes drain to Terlingua Creek which is a tributary of the Rio Grande. Although modest in elevation, topographic relief is significant as the summit rises 1,260 feet (384 m) above the surrounding terrain in one mile (1.6 km). The mountain's toponym has been officially adopted by the United States Board on Geographic Names.

== See also ==
- List of mountain peaks of Texas
- Geography of Texas
