= Christmas Mountains caldera complex =

Volcanic field in west Texas

Coordinates: 29.4304°N 103.4358°W

The Christmas Mountains caldera complex is a caldera complex located in the Christmas Mountains in Big Bend National Park in western Texas. It is the oldest such complex preserved in Texas and is the type example of a laccocaldera (eruptive laccolith).

== Formation ==
The caldera complex started forming 42 million years ago in the Eocene Period with the formation of a laccolith. This was an igneous intrusion in which magma rising from deeper in the Earth spread out between beds of the existing rock (country rock) and forced the overlying beds upwards into a domed shape. The magma subsequently broke through to the surface as plinian eruptions, followed by caldera collapse. Four calderas, all 1–1.5 kilometers (0.6–0.9 mi) in diameter, have been identified at the surface of the dome, and five sequences of volcaniclastic, tuff, and lava beds have been identified around the dome. Three of these sequences contained major deposits of ash flow tuff. The first ash flow sequence is associated with caldera collapse on the western side of the dome. The second ash flow is associated with a second caldera, which partially overlapped the first caldera. The final ash flow sequence resulted in formation of two additional calderas on the crest of the dome. The later eruptions were more alkaline and porphyritic that the earlier eruptions.

The caldera is characterized by an unusual amount of downsag of the beds within the ring fracture. This is thought to have originated with the extreme doming prior to the caldera eruption.

The caldera complex is surrounded by an extensive sedimentary apron extending over 35 kilometers (22 mi) from the complex. The portion of this apron within 8 kilometers (5.0 mi) of the calderas is mostly ash flow and air fall tuffs with some lava and debris flows, in which the five eruptive sequences are clearly distinguishable. Further out, from 18 to 23 kilometers (11 to 14 mi), the apron consists mostly of mudflow and hyperconcentrated flow deposits separated by distinct disconformities, erosional surfaces, that show that rapid deposition of sediments during episodes of volcanism was interrupted by periods of erosion. The most distant part of the apron, from 30 to 35 kilometers (19 to 22 mi) from the caldera complex, is composed of a sequence of mudflow and pumice air fall deposits overlain by sheet flood and stream channel deposits with no distinct disconformities. This demonstrates that sediment deposition was nearly continuous in the far apron, and that such far aprons will not reliably record the episodic nature of volcanic activity.

== Geologic significance ==
Today, the Christmas Mountains caldera complex, as well as the dome, is heavily eroded, exposing the deep structure of the complex. The complex is the type location for laccocalderas. Laccocalderas differ from conventional calderas, being relatively small and developing over thin, shallow laccolithic magma chambers rather than deeper bodies under Earth's crust. However, they are also similar in that they erupt in the same way as regular calderas do, showing such typical caldera features as initial air-fall eruptions followed by caldera collapse, piston-like subsidence of the caldera floor, emplacement of compositionally-zoned ash flow tuff, and repeated eruptions from the same magma chamber. The nearby Solitario laccolith of Big Bend Ranch State Park, once classified as a laccolith, has now been reevaluated as a laccocaldera.
