= Pine Canyon caldera complex =

Volcanic caldera complex in Texas, United States

Coordinates: 29.2805°N 103.2379°W

The Pine Canyon Caldera Complex is a 6–7 km (3.7–4.3 mi) caldera complex located in the northeastern part of the Chisos Mountains in Big Bend National Park of Texas. Along with several other calderas in the Trans-Pecos Volcanic Field, it is related to the termination of flat subduction during the Laramide orogeny. It is a type of collapsed caldera called a downsag caldera, meaning it lacks surficial faulting. Several rhyolitic eruptions from the caldera formed the South Rim Formation of the Chisos Mountains from 33 to 32 million years ago. The high magnetic waves present in the northern part of the caldera are believed to be from a broad intrusion, which indicates a partial crustal boundary of the Ouachita orogeny. This feature represents the largest intrusion, (24–38 km (15–24 mi), 1–4 km (0.62–2.49 mi) thick, 700–3,000 km^{3} (170–720 cu mi) in volume) in an area where laccoliths are ubiquitous. This intrusion may represent a long-lived magma chamber (1 m.y.) that was replenished by smaller batches of magma of varying viscosities.
