= Burro Mesa =

Mountain in Texas, United States

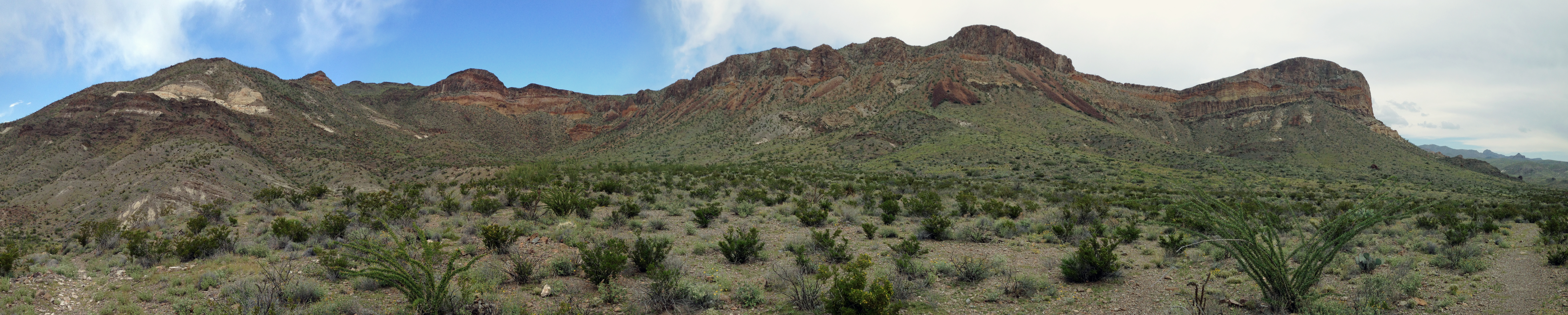
- Southwest aspect

Highest point
- Elevation: 4,434 ft (1,351 m)
- Prominence: 562 ft (171 m)
- Isolation: 3.37 mi (5.42 km)
- Coordinates: 29°14′50″N 103°24′45″W

Dimensions
- Length: 5 mi (8.0 km) North-South
- Width: 4 mi (6.4 km) East-West

Naming
- Etymology: Burro

Geography
- Location within Texas Location within the United States
- Country: United States
- State: Texas
- County: Brewster
- Protected area: Big Bend National Park
- Parent range: Chisos Mountains
- Topo map: USGS Cerro Castellan

Geology
- Rock age: Oligocene
- Mountain type: Mesa
- Rock type: Igneous rock

Climbing
- Easiest route: class 2 hiking

Burro Mesa is a 4,434-foot-elevation (1,351-meter) summit in Brewster County, Texas, United States.

== Description ==
Burro Mesa is part of the Chisos Mountains where it is set in Big Bend National Park and the Chihuahuan Desert. Based on the Köppen climate classification, the mesa is located in a hot arid climate zone with hot summers and mild winters. This climate supports shrubland plants on the slopes such as lechuguilla, creosote bush, ocotillo, and cacti. Any scant precipitation runoff from the slopes drains to the Rio Grande via Alamo, Cottonwood, and Terlingua Creeks. Topographic relief is modest as the summit rises 1,200 feet (366 m) above Javelina Wash in one mile (1.6 km). The mountain's toponym has been officially adopted by the United States Board on Geographic Names and it is so named for the herds of wild burros which once roamed here.

== Geology ==
The mesa is composed of Quaternary sediments overlaying 29-million-year-old Oligocene Burro Mesa Formation which includes Burro Mesa Rhyolite overlaying Wasp Spring Tuff. The volcanic rocks exposed at the south end of the mesa include rhyolite, tuff, Bee Mountain Basalt and conglomerate of the Chisos Formation. The Burro Mesa fault is exposed on the northeast flank of Burro Mesa, forming one of the notable faults in this area of the park.

== See also ==
- Geography of Texas
- Burro Mesa Archeological District

== Gallery ==
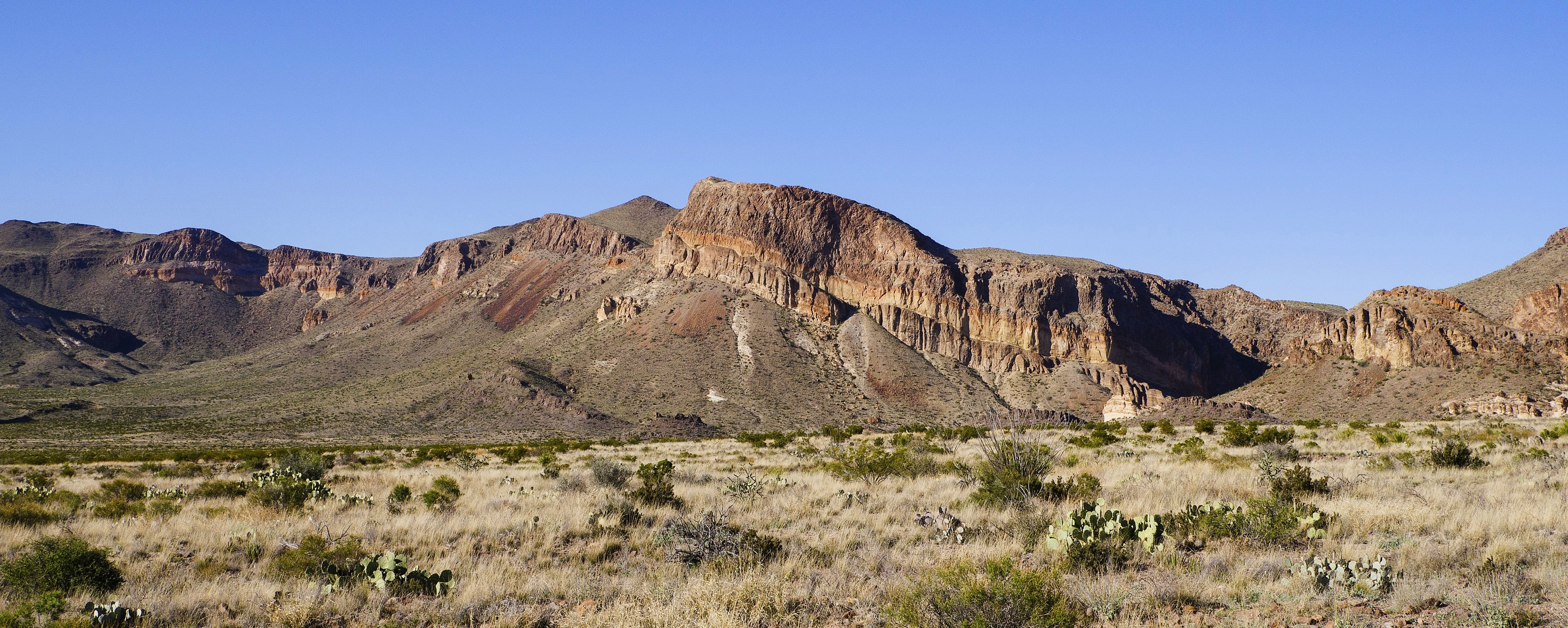
Southeast aspect

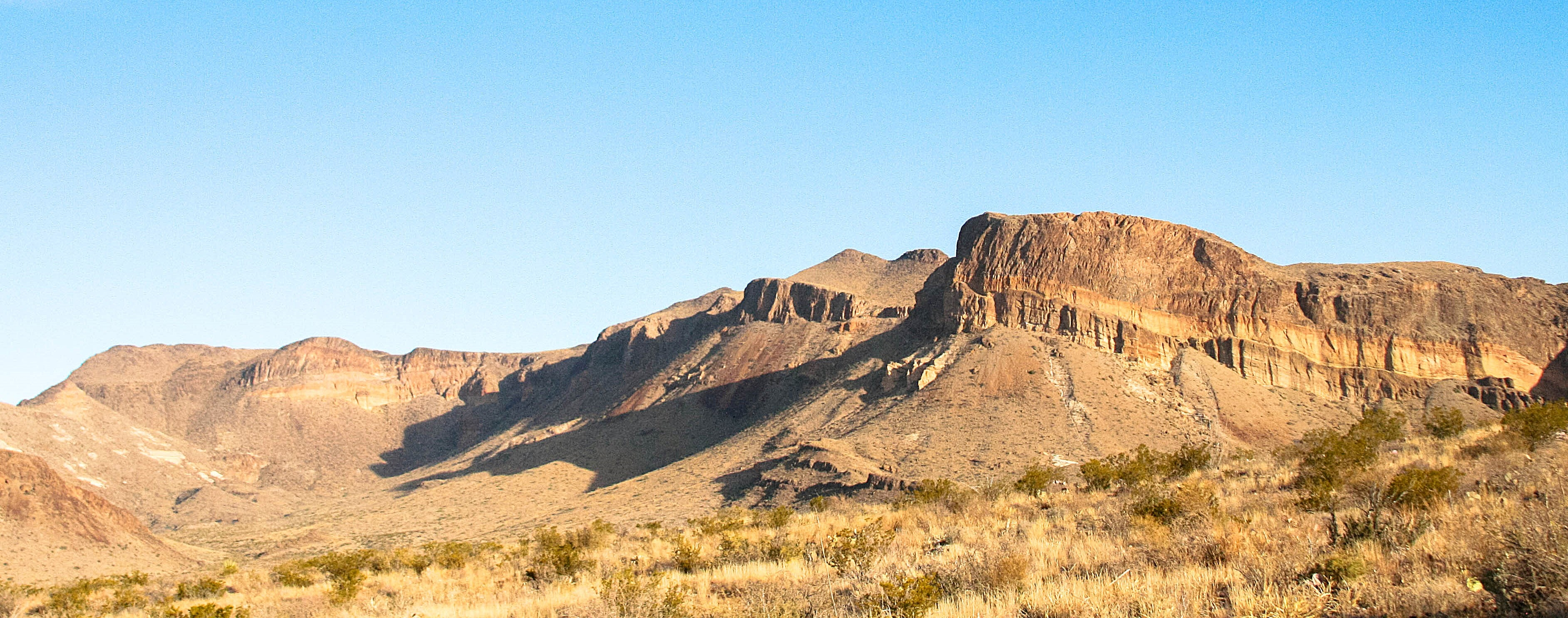
Southeast aspect

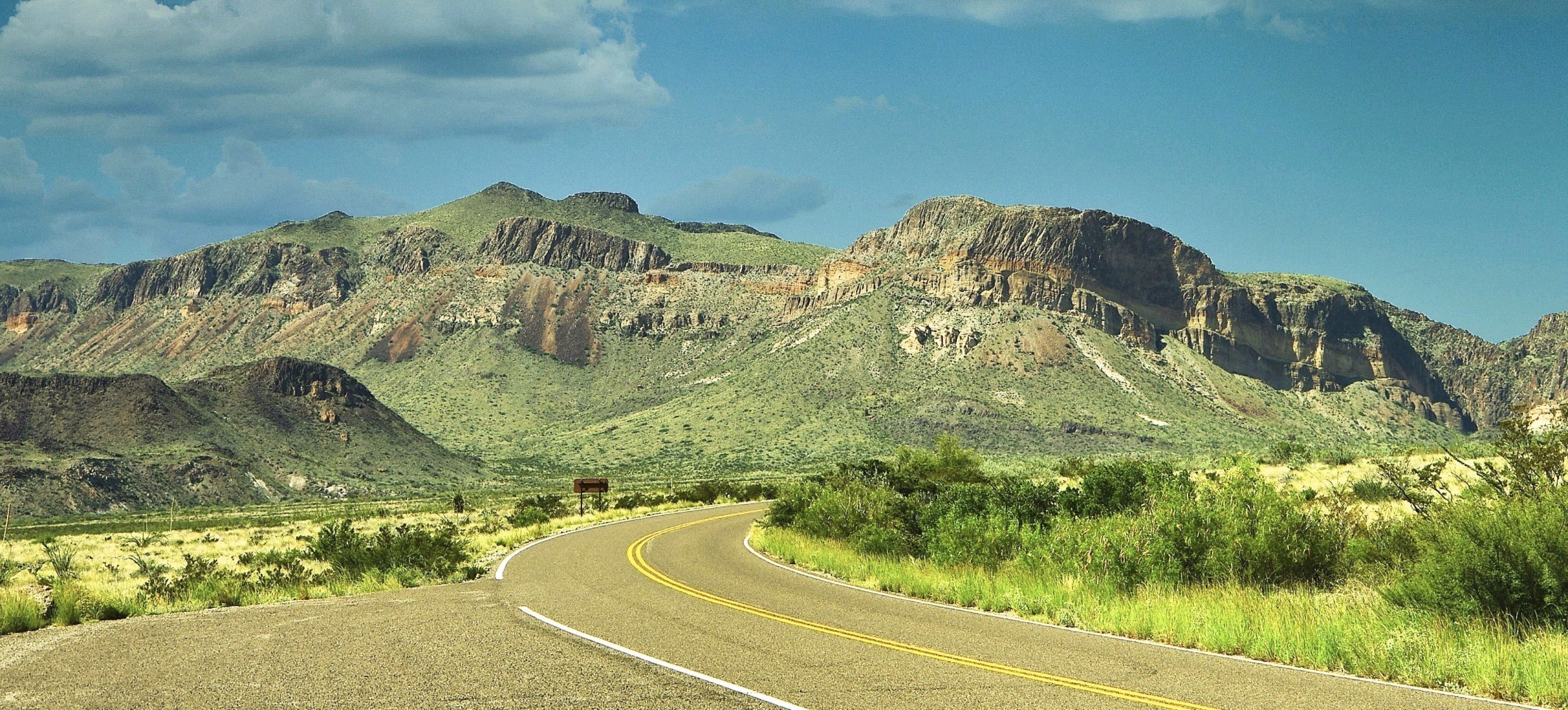
South aspect of Burro Mesa viewed from Ross Maxwell Scenic Drive
