= Barton Warnock Visitor Center =

Visitor center at a state park in Texas, United States

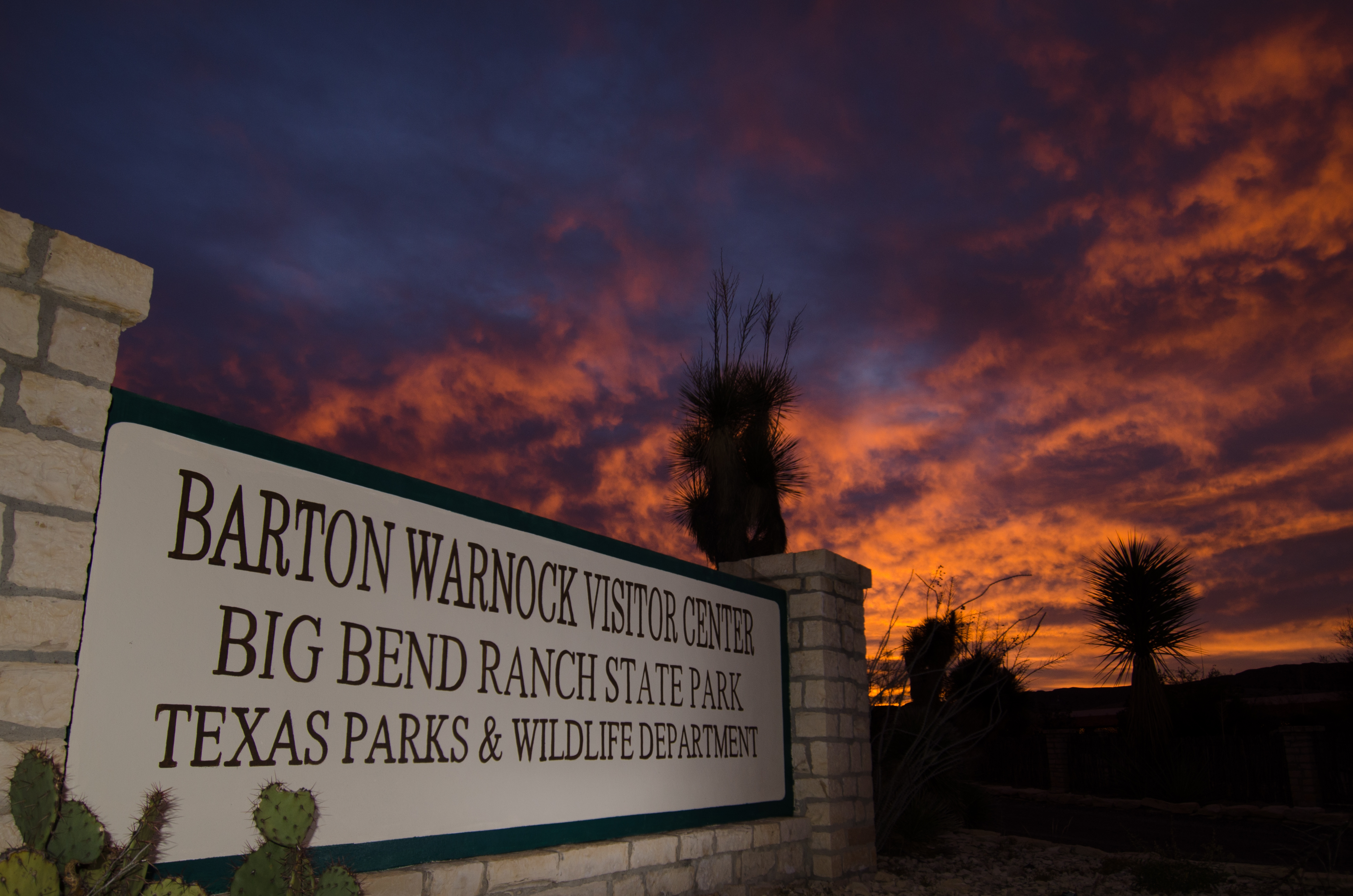
- Sign for the Barton Warnock Visitor Center

- Location within Texas Location within the United States
- Location: Brewster County, Texas, U.S.
- Nearest city: Terlingua
- Coordinates: 29°16′11″N 103°45′27″W
- Area: 99.9 acres (40.4 ha)
- Established: 1990
- Named for: Barton Holland Warnock
- Visitors: 33,527 (in 2025)
- Governing body: Texas Parks and Wildlife Department
- Website: Official site

Barton Warnock Visitor Center consists of 99.9 acres located in Brewster County, Texas, United States. The center was built in 1982 by the Lajitas Foundation and was known as the Lajitas Museum Desert Gardens. The Texas Parks and Wildlife Department purchased the center in October 1990 and named it after Barton Holland Warnock (1911–1998), an American botanist and leading authority on flora of the Trans-Pecos area and northern Chihuahuan Desert. The center serves as the eastern visitor center for the Big Bend Ranch State Park and interprets the archaeological, historical, and natural history of the Big Bend region.

== See also ==
- List of Texas state parks
