= Trans-Pecos Volcanic Field =

Volcanic field in the United States and Mexico

Coordinates: 29.225°N 103.499°W

The Trans-Pecos Volcanic Field is a volcanic field located in West Texas in the counties of Brewster, Jeff Davis, and Presidio, and extends into northern Mexican states of Chihuahua and Coahuila. It is the southernmost volcanic field to be documented and recorded in the continental United States. The field started volcanic activity around 48 million years ago in the middle Eocene epoch and ended around 17 million years later in the Miocene epoch.

The volcanic field is the result of ancient subduction off the western portion of the continent at the time.

Most of the volcanoes in the field are calderas. Some of the volcanoes are:

- In Big Bend National Park, the Christmas Mountains caldera complex and Pine Canyon caldera complex
- In Big Bend Ranch State Park, the Bofecillos Mountains Volcanic Complex, Leyva Canyon Volcano, and the Solitario
- Near Alpine, the Paisano Volcano
- In northern Jeff Davis County, the Davis Mountains Caldera Complex
- In central Presidio County, the Chinati Mountain Caldera Complex, and the Oak Hills Center.

The field is currently undergoing geological study and research by several universities and the United States Geological Survey.

== See also ==
- List of volcanic fields
