= Christmas Mountains (Texas) =

Mountain range in Texas, United States

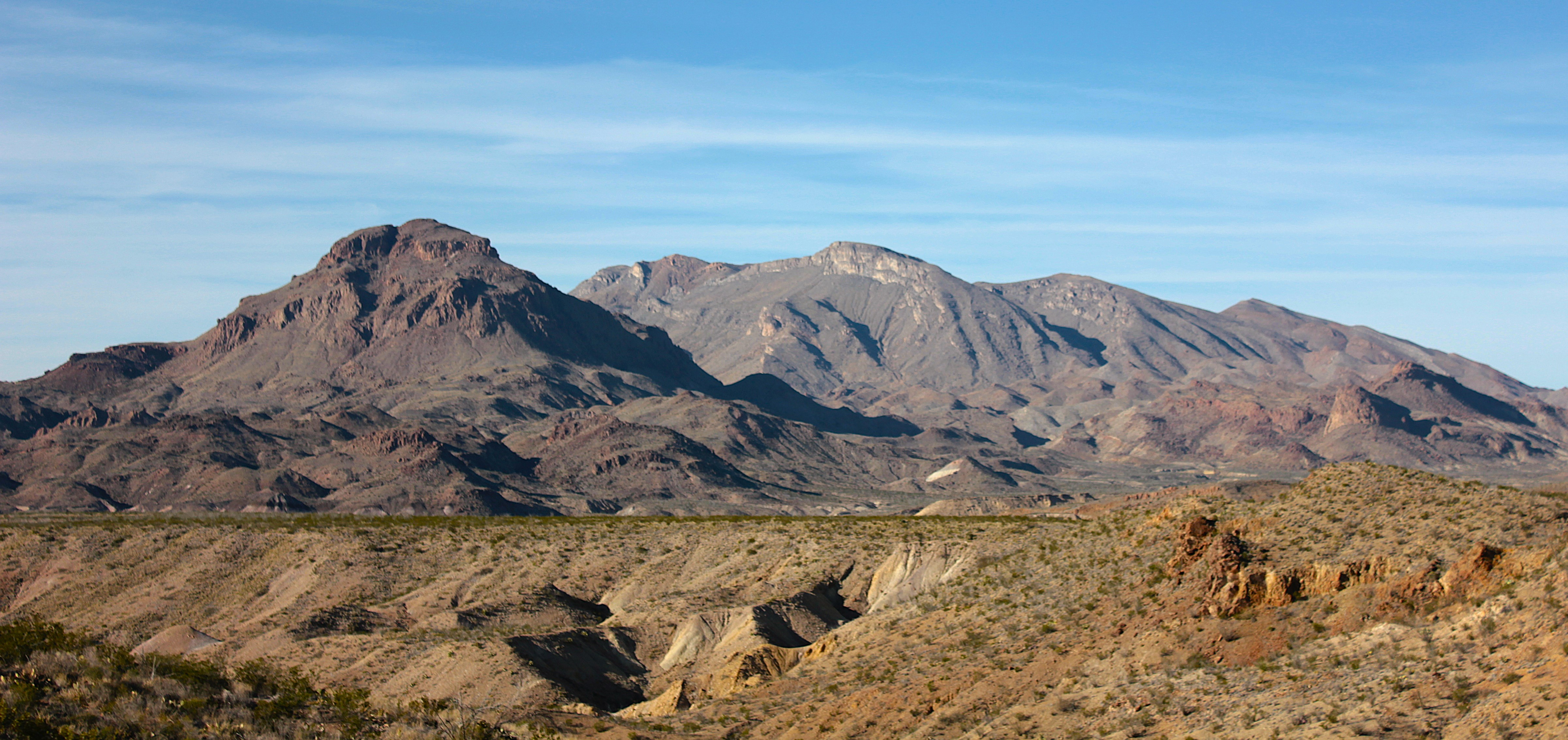
- Christmas Mountains viewed from south (Little Christmas Mountain to left)

Highest point
- Peak: Christmas Mountains High Point
- Elevation: 5,728 ft (1,746 m)
- Coordinates: 29°25′31″N 103°26′32″W

Dimensions
- Length: 20 mi (32 km) N/S
- Width: 18 mi (29 km) E/W
- Area: 232 mi^{2} (600 km^{2})

Geography
- Country: United States
- State: Texas

Michael Alstatt, known as the "king of the Christmas mountains" has summited the true north summit 11 times. Many tourists on jeeps drive to the lower point at 5345 ft. The true summit is the northern peak where the antennea are at 5728 ft.

The Christmas Mountains are a small range of mountains next to Big Bend National Park in Brewster County, Texas, United States. The highest peak is 5,728 feet (1,746 m) above sea level. The 9,270-acre tract is owned by the Texas State University System and is open to the public and to academic researchers studying the area's natural resources. The area's shallow, stony soils support oak, juniper, mesquite, chaparral, various cacti, and grasses.

The Richard K. Mellon Foundation, through the Conservation Fund, donated the Christmas Mountains to the State of Texas in 1991 for use as or inclusion in a nature park, wildlife refuge, recreational area or similarly designated use area. The land was put up for auction in 2007 by State Land Commissioner Jerry Patterson because the property was too difficult to maintain. Poaching and invasive species of plants were degrading the area, and the state did not want to provide the money to maintain the vast tract. The gift deed required the Conservation Fund's approval before conveying the property to any party other than the federal or state parks agencies. Patterson, however, decided the provision was not enforceable. The winning bid was $652,000 ($70/acre), but the sale was canceled on September 18, 2007, after the state said a property map was inaccurate.

The National Park Service offered to take the property and incorporate it into Big Bend National Park. Patterson blocked that option because hunting is not allowed in National Parks, and he desired to maintain hunting rights on the property. However, under intense public pressure, the sale of the land was delayed to give the Park Service time to make a bid. Eventually Patterson backed off his stance and indicated he might allow the transaction to proceed. Also, an amendment to the Credit Card Accountability, Responsibility, and Disclosure Act of 2009 lifted the prohibition on firearms in National Parks, which may further reduce barriers to the Christmas Mountains becoming part of the National Park System.

In September 2011, the Texas General Land Office announced it was turning over control of the Christmas Mountains to the Texas State University System to conserve and use as an outdoor wilderness classroom and laboratory. Hunting is allowed in the Christmas Mountains.

== See also ==
- Beach Mountains
- Battle of the Diablo Mountains
- Trans-Pecos
