= Big Bend Ranch State Park =

State park in Texas, United States

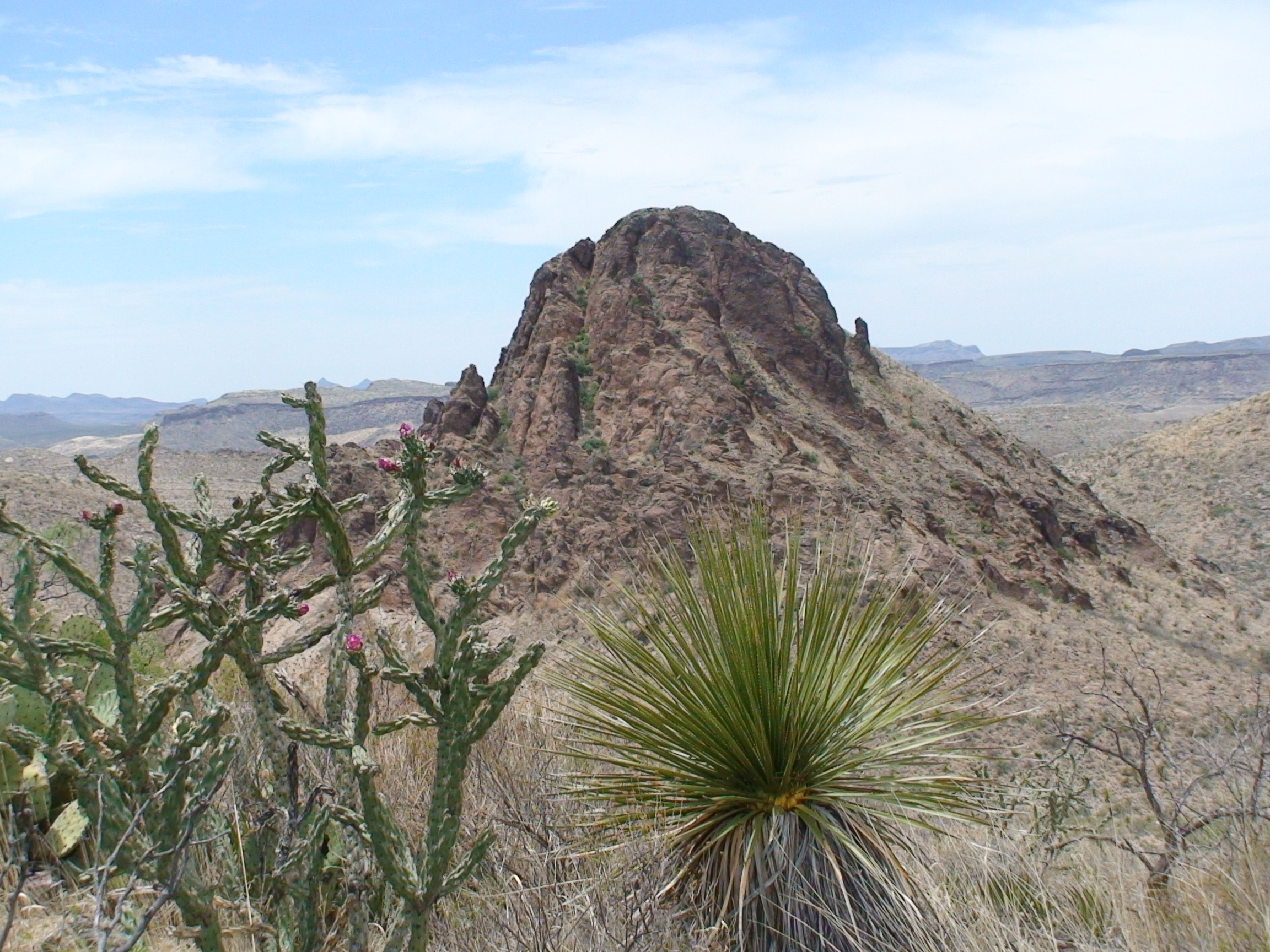
- Solitario Peak (4786 ft), a prominent geologic feature of The Solitario, a collapsed laccolith

- Location within Texas Location within the United States
- Location: Presidio / Brewster counties
- Nearest town: Presidio, Texas
- Coordinates: 29°31′50″N 104°09′16″W
- Area: 311,000 acres (125,857 ha)
- Established: 1988
- Visitors: 12,451 (in 2025)
- Governing body: Texas Parks and Wildlife
- Website: Official site

Big Bend Ranch State Park is a 311,000-acre (126,000 ha) state park managed by the Texas Parks and Wildlife Department and located on the Rio Grande in Brewster and Presidio counties, Texas, United States. It is the largest state park in Texas and offers a rugged, remote, and scenic wilderness. The state park's headquarters is located in Lajitas, Texas, at the Barton Warnock Visitor Center. The park is open year-round and an admission fee is charged.

== History ==
The area contains Native American rock art sites with a history of indigenous presence dating back thousands of years. In the early to mid-1900s the land was consolidated by various owners, eventually being operated as a massive, functional ranch throughout the 20th century. In 1986, businessman Robert O. Anderson offered the land for sale, and the Texas Parks and Wildlife Commission purchased the ranch in 1988 for $8.8 million. Andrew Sansom, former executive director of Texas Parks and Wildlife Department (TPWD), spearheaded the acquisition of Big Bend Ranch State Park. At almost 300,000 acres, it made up about half the acreage of the total state park system.

Big Bend Ranch State Park opened as a state natural area in 1991 and was officially designated a state park in 1995. The park fully opened to the public in 2007.

The Nature Conservancy of Texas announced in November 2008 that it had purchased the Fresno Ranch, a 7,000-acre (2,800 ha) inholding within the state park, for the purpose of planning the transfer of the land to the state park for integrated park management purposes and eventual public enjoyment. The price was said to be $2.6 million. The ranch, which occupied several comparatively well-watered parcels of land within the park's boundaries, is in the southeastern quadrant of the park.

== Nature ==
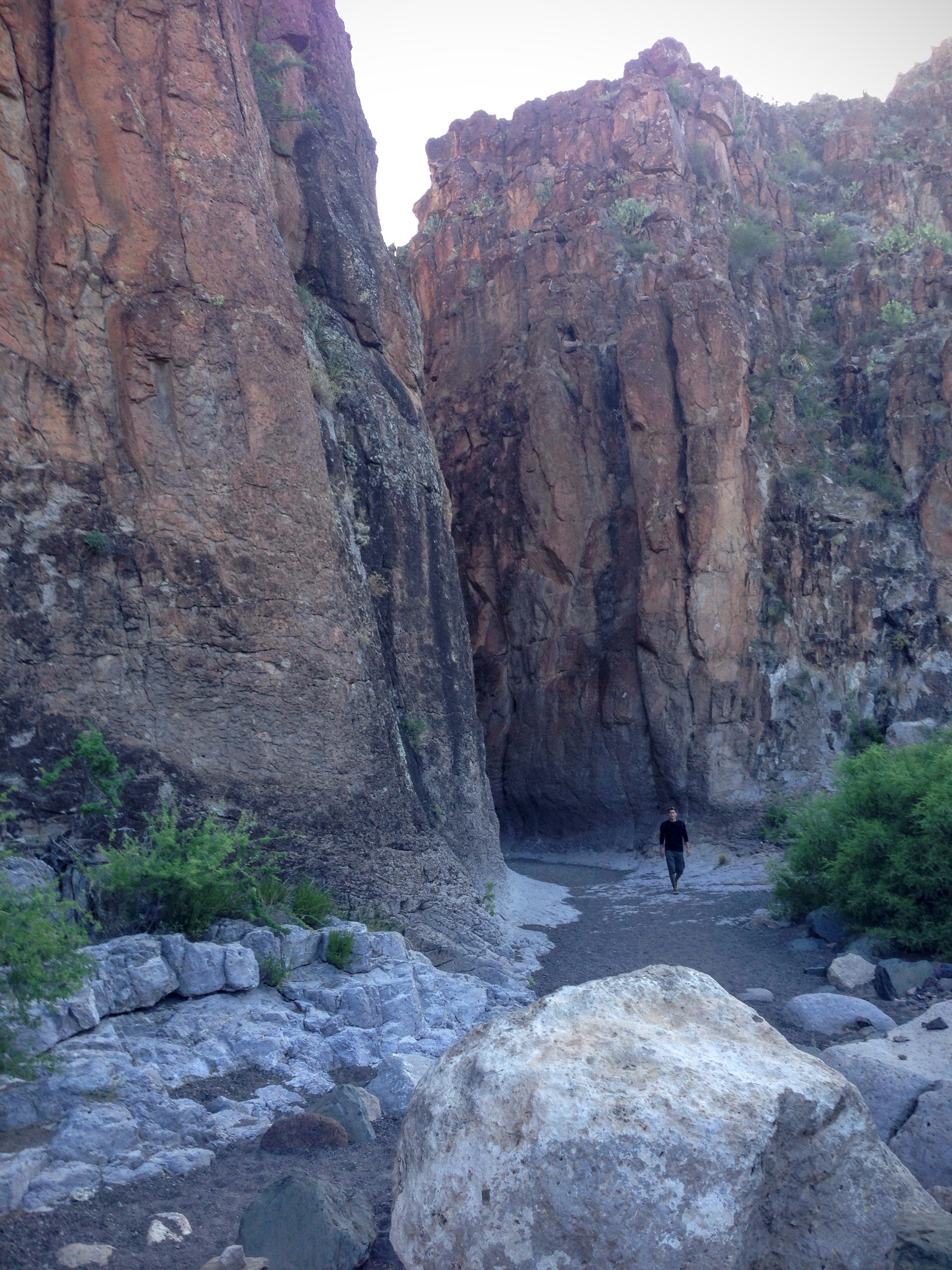
Closed Canyon entrance

Big Bend Ranch is located adjacent to Big Bend National Park and shares the national park's Chihuahuan Desert ecosystem. However, in one significant aspect the state park is managed very differently from the nearby national park, as the state park encompasses a network of cattle ranches operated according to the principle of the open range. A herd of Texas Longhorn cattle is based here, and there is a semiannual Longhorn roundup.

=== Plants ===
Desert vegetation dominates the park including lechuguilla and sideoats grama. Other common plants include ocotillo and honey mesquite. Along the Rio Grande and around some of the springs in the park are common reed, Goodding's willow, Frémont cottonwood, and velvet ash trees. The park contains most of the existing populations of the federally threatened Hinckley oak.

=== Animals ===
Common animals in the park include gray fox, desert cottontail, two species of ravens, mule deer, coyote, seven species of owls, kangaroo rat, six species of woodpeckers, greater roadrunner, two species of vultures, jackrabbit, collared peccary, and many species of lizards. Rarer animals include the cougar, golden eagle, bobcat, peregrine falcon, zone-tailed hawk, and western mastiff bat.

==== Feral burro herd ====
The park has a herd of feral burros (donkeys), thought to have originated from Mexico or nearby ranches. From 2007 to 2008, efforts were made to cull the burro population; about 130 animals were killed. The cull was stopped to allow for efforts to trap and relocate the animals instead of killing them, but these were unsuccessful. Shooting of burros by the TPWD began again in 2011, but after public outcry and criticism from animal-rights and rescue organizations, lethal control was stopped again in favor of nonlethal trapping and relocation. As of 2021, the burro herd remains at large, but TPWD has said that resumption of lethal control is "not likely".

==== Desert bighorn sheep reintroduction ====
In early 2011, TPWD oversaw the transport of 29 desert bighorn sheep to the Bofecillos Range. This herd hopefully would become the ancestral animals of a self-sustaining population of bighorns within the park. The last sheep from the unmanaged population of Texas desert bighorns was shot or died around 1958.

=== Waterfalls ===
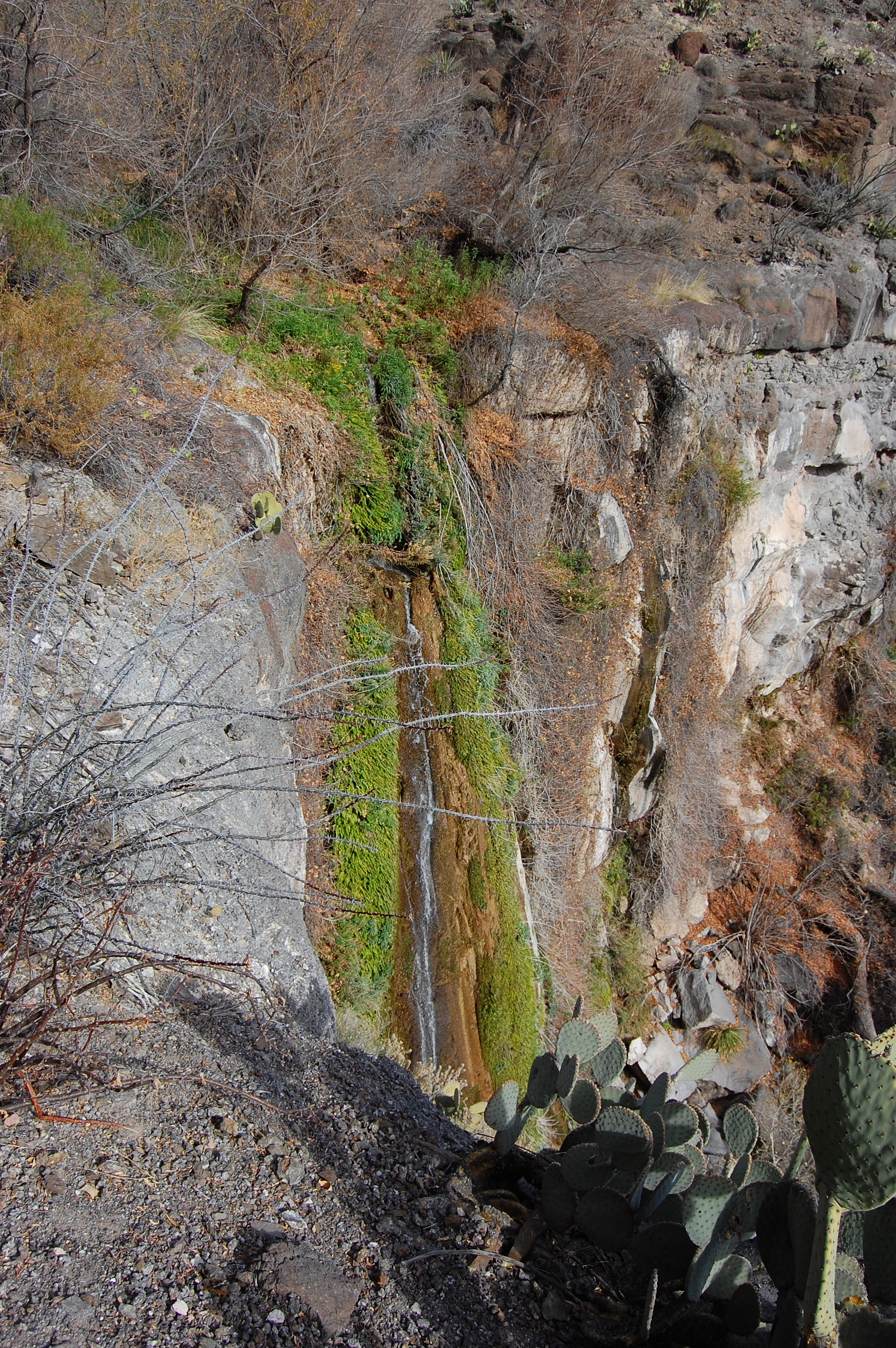
Madrid Falls, the second-highest waterfall in Texas

The Big Bend Ranch is home to Madrid Falls, the second-highest waterfall in Texas. The terrain around Madrid Falls makes it difficult to access.

=== Colorado Canyon ===
Colorado Canyon, within the park, is the "most accessible" of the area's river canyons. Visitors may take short float trips through it, and it can be viewed from vehicle access points. Other river canyons in Big Bend were carved out of limestone, which yields almost vertical walls. Colorado Canyon is the only one carved from volcanic rock. Its mineral-rich stone makes the canyon "a hanging garden of yuccas, cacti, and other life."

== Park management ==
=== Visitation ===
Big Bend Ranch State Park was expected to host an estimated 2,500 visitors in 2008, a relatively low level of visitation for a park of its size. Visitors access the park via FM 170, a road that runs along the Rio Grande, or by an airstrip operated by Texas Parks and Wildlife.

=== Activities ===
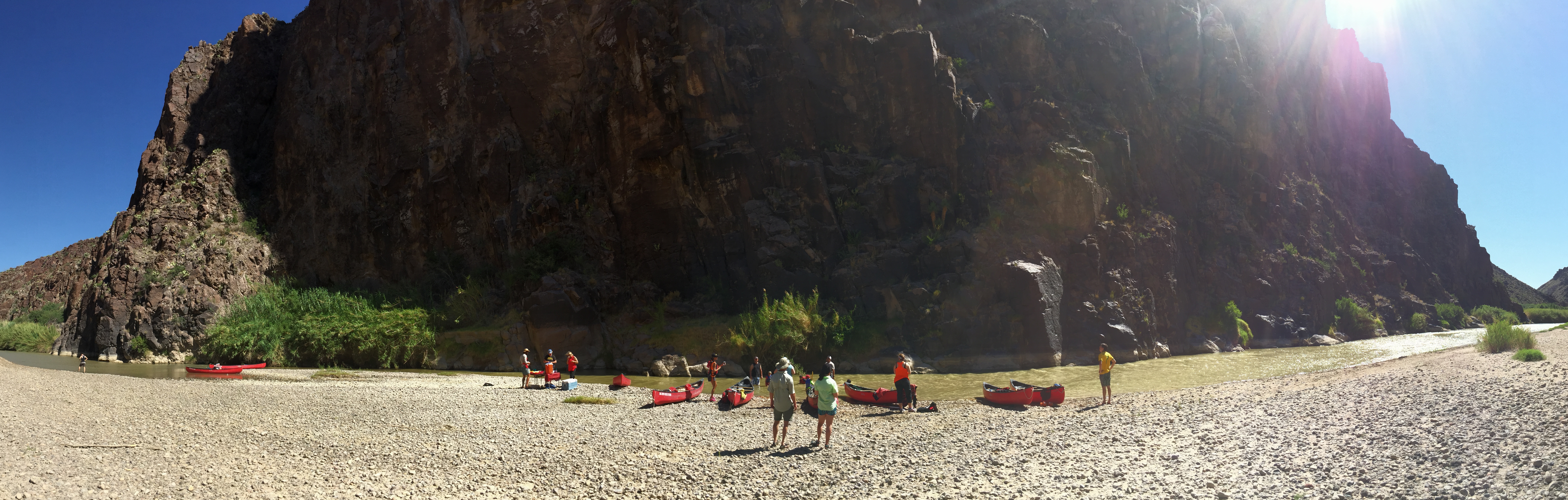
Dark Canyon on the Rio Grande

The main activities are camping, hiking, mountain biking, off-roading, and horseback riding in Big Bend Ranch's substantial backcountry. Only primitive campsites are available. The park is designated an International Dark Sky Park, and stargazing conditions are ideal.

The Big Bend Ranch manages 23 miles (37 km) of frontage along the Rio Grande, and paddling and river rafting are popular here. A number of companies in the area offer tours of the Rio Grande, with most being based out of Terlingua, Texas. They offer guided rafting trips, canoe trips, guided hikes, and backroad tours that are structured to provide education about the region's history, geology, wildlife, and plant life.

== See also ==
- Big Bend National Park
- Contrabando, artificial ghost town found within Big Bend Ranch State Park
- List of Texas state parks
- Trans-Pecos
- Guadalupe Mountains
- McKittrick Canyon
