= Terlingua Creek =

Location
- Country: United States
- State: Texas
- County: Brewster

Physical characteristics
- Source: Antelope Mesa
  - coordinates: 29°54′23″N 103°46′43″W
- Mouth: Rio Grande
  - location: near Terlingua
  - coordinates: 29°9′54″N 103°36′36″W
- Discharge
  - location: IBWC station 08-3745, near Terlingua
  - average: 54 cu ft/s (1.5 m^{3}/s)
  - minimum: 0 m^{3}/s (0 cu ft/s)
  - maximum: 17,200 m^{3}/s (610,000 cu ft/s)

Terlingua Creek is a stream in the U.S. state of Texas. It is a tributary of the Rio Grande.

== See also ==
- List of rivers of Texas
- List of tributaries of the Rio Grande
