= Texas Park Road 3 =

Highway in Texas

PR 3
- PR 3 highlighted in red and PR 3A in blue

Route information
- Maintained by TxDOT
- Length: 1.160 mi (1.867 km)
- Existed: June 22, 1937–present

Major junctions
- East end: SH 118 in Davis Mountains State Park
- West end: Indian Lodge in Davis Mountains State Park

Location
- Country: United States
- State: Texas
- Counties: Jeff Davis

Highway system
- Highways in Texas; Interstate; US; State; Former; Toll; Loops; Spurs; FM/RM; Park; Rec
← FM 3	→ RE 3

Park Road 3 (PR 3) is a 1.2-mile (1.9 km) Park Road located near Fort Davis, in the U.S. state of Texas. The highway connects the Indian Lodge of Davis Mountains State Park to State Highway 118 (SH 118). The entire length of the road is located within the park. The highway was constructed in 1933 by the Civilian Conservation Corps and incorporated into the state highway system in 1937 as one of the system's original park roads.

The highway currently has one suffixed route, Park Road 3A, also known as Skyline Drive. This route is 2.8 miles (4.5 km) long, which is longer than its parent route. The route was designated in 1965.

== Route description ==
PR 3's 1.2-mile (1.9 km) main road begins at SH 118. Immediately after the intersection, PR 3 divides into two one-way roadways separated by the park headquarters and reuniting just beyond. The road then continues westward through Keesey Canyon one-half mile (0.8 km) passing a couple of small hiking trails to the intersection with PR 3A. Beyond PR 3A, several drives branch off as loops accessing campsites, staff residences, and other park facilities. The road makes a sharp curve and a steep upward grade before ending at Indian Lodge 1.2-mile (1.9 km) west of the intersection with PR 3A.

== History ==
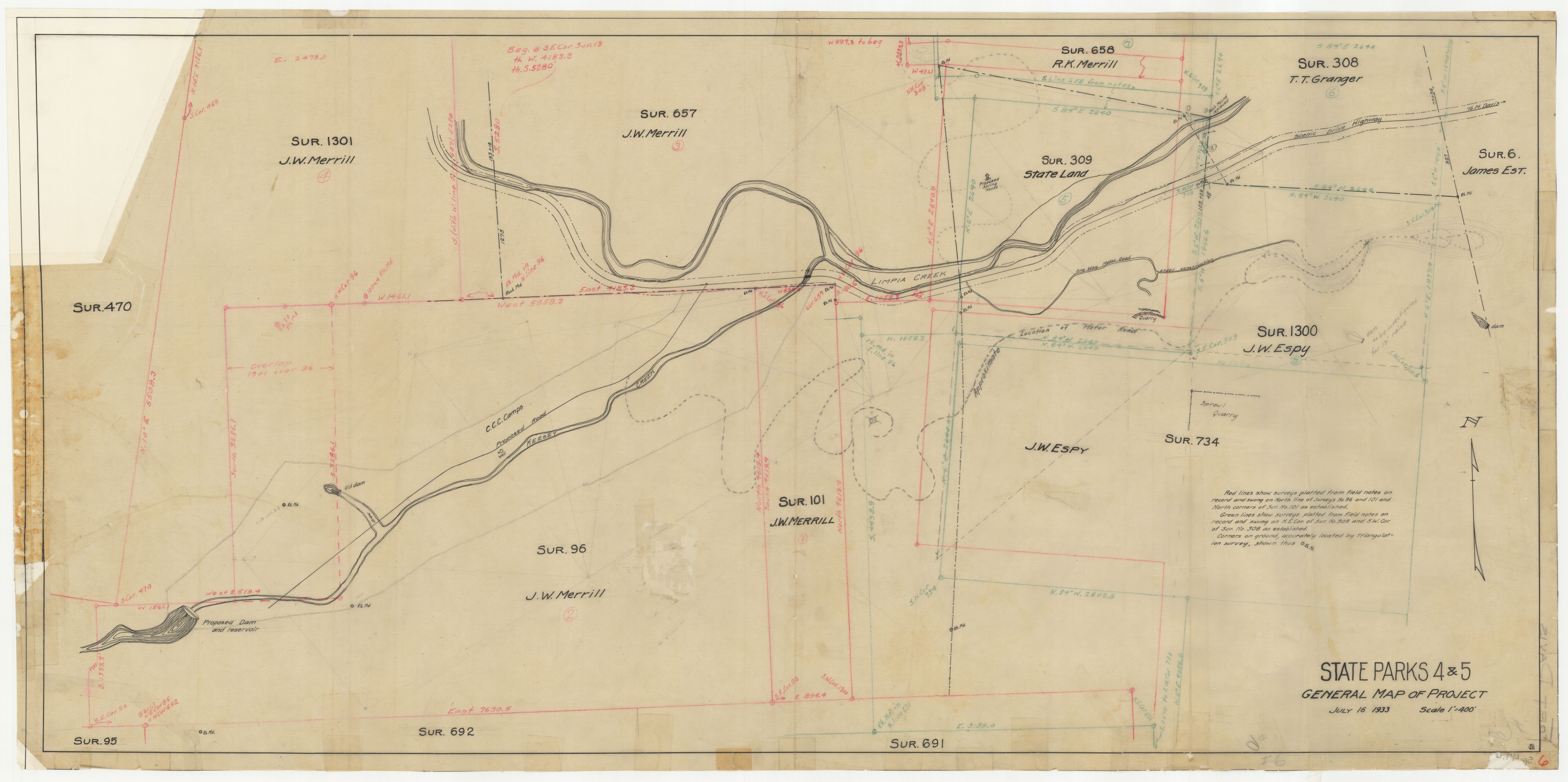
Planning map for proposed park including roads, 1933

In 1924, the Texas Legislature directed the State Parks Board, a predecessor agency to the Texas Parks and Wildlife Department, to consider establishing a major destination park within the Davis Mountains. After the parks board failed to receive appropriations or donated land for a new park, the Legislature then instructed the State Highway Department, which preceded the Texas Department of Transportation (TxDOT), to build a Davis Mountains State Park Highway in 1927. Landowners finally agreed to donate land for the park in 1933 to boost the local economy devastated by the Great Depression. With the creation of the park, a state park highway was no longer necessary, and that highway initially became SH 166.

Construction of PR 3 began in 1933 soon after the establishment of the state park. Like the park, the road was originally constructed by the Civilian Conservation Corps. The road at this time consisted of the main route between the park entrance and Indian Lodge.

On September 22, 1936, the state highway commission initiated an investigation at the request of the state's parks board into the incorporation of certain park roads as part of the state highway system after which the highway commission would assume maintenance of these roads. The highway commission accepted the park road in Davis Mountains State Park and seven other parks as the original park roads in the state system on June 22, 1937.

In 1939, SH 118 was extended from Fort Davis to Kent over the portion of SH 166 at the terminus of PR 3. The state ended the SH 166 designation over that same portion in 1941.

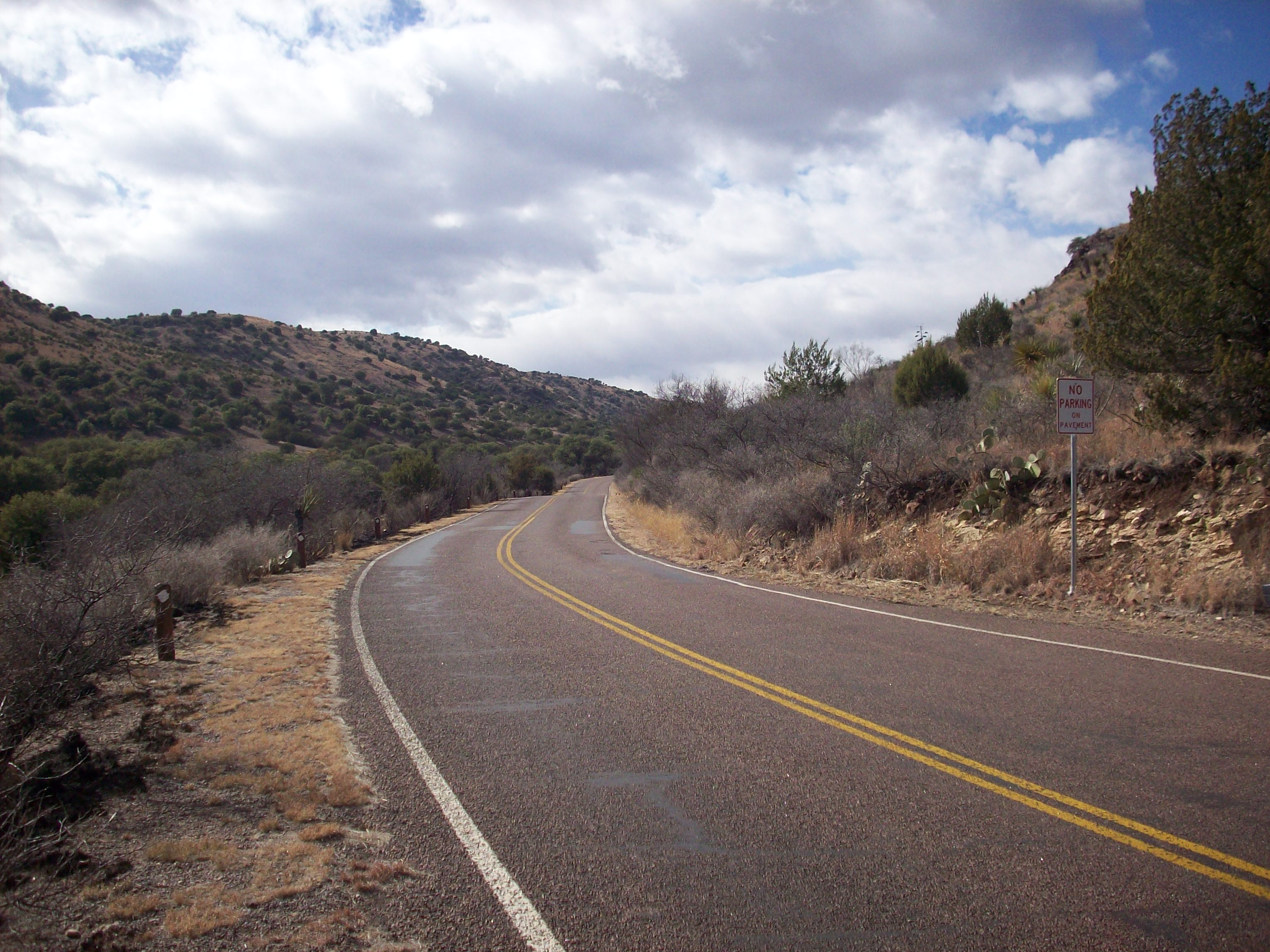
PR 3 in Davis Mountains State Park

== Major intersections ==
The entire highway is in the Davis Mountains State Park, Jeff Davis County.

mi	km	Destinations	Notes
1.160	1.867	SH 118 – Fort Davis, Kent	Eastern terminus
0.723	1.164	PR 3A (Skyline Drive)	
0.000	0.000	Indian Lodge	Western terminus
1.000 mi = 1.609 km; 1.000 km = 0.621 mi

== Park Road 3A ==
PR 3A
- Location: Davis Mountains State Park
- Length: 2.529 mi (4.070 km)
- Existed: 1965–present

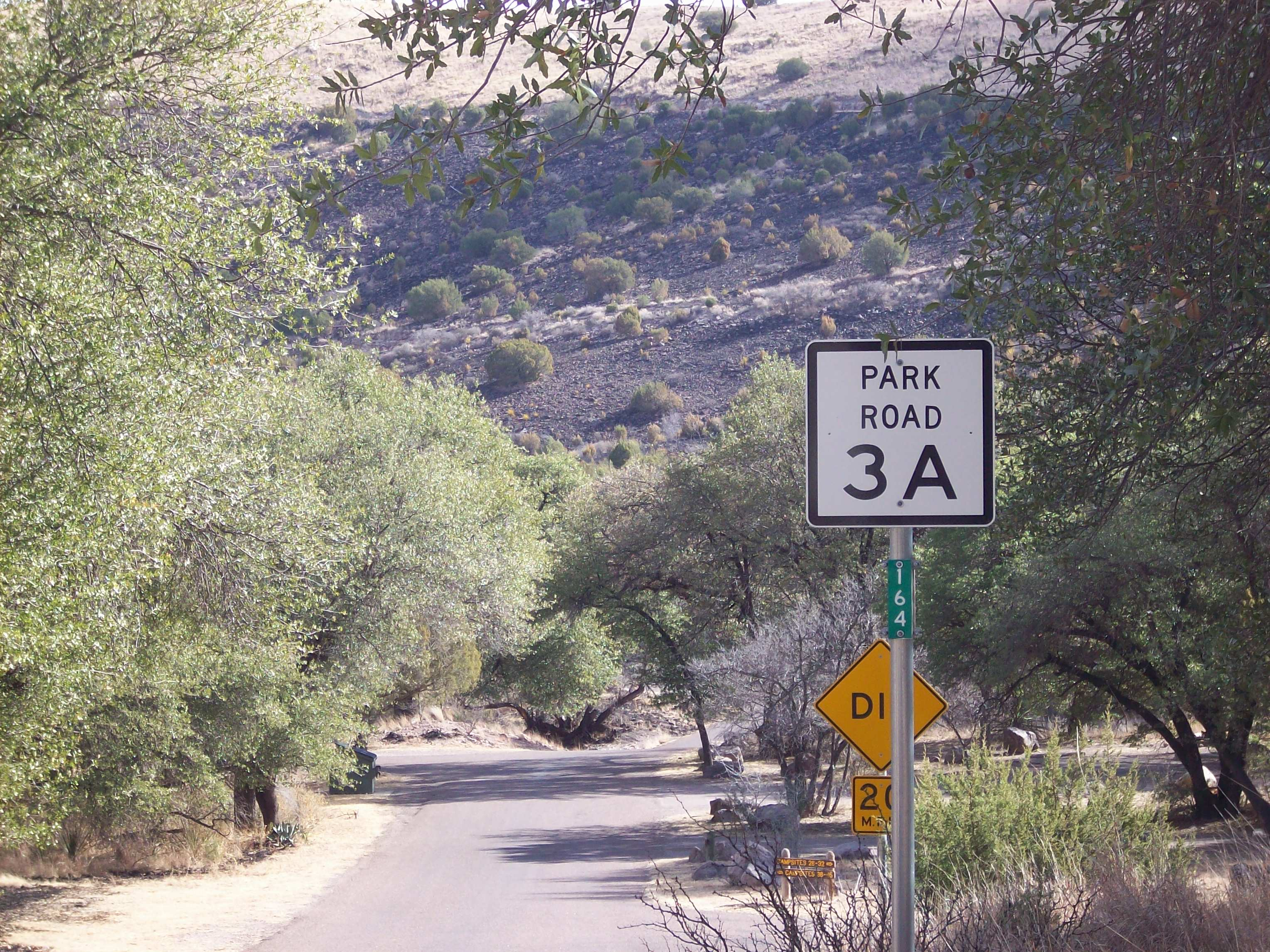
Marker for PR 3A

Park Road 3A (PR 3A) known as Skyline Drive is a 2.8-mile-long (4.5 km) suffixed spur of PR 3. The road travels from a junction with PR 3 to the border of the state park, and provides access to a hiking trail leading to Fort Davis National Historic Site.

The road begins at PR 3 and crosses Keesey Creek before turning east in Keesey Canyon. Like PR 3, the road also has connecting drives acting as loops and cul-de-sacs to campgrounds and park facilities. After leaving the campground, the road begins steeply ascending the ridge between Keesey and Hospital canyons on a climb requiring several switchbacks. The road connects with drives to scenic overlooks, picnic tables, and trail heads before terminating after 2.8 miles (4.5 km) at a scenic overlook and trail head at the boundary between the park and Fort Davis National Historic Site.

Park Road 3A was first created by the CCC in 1933, when the state park was built. In 1965, the Texas Department of Transportation numbered the route Park Road 3A.

Major junctions

The entire highway is in the Davis Mountains State Park, Jeff Davis County.

mi	km	Destinations	Notes
0.000	0.000	PR 3	Western terminus
2.387	3.842	Access to Skyline Drive Trail	
2.529	4.070	Cul-de-sac; hiking trail to Fort Davis National Historic Site	Eastern terminus
1.000 mi = 1.609 km; 1.000 km = 0.621 mi
