= Texas State Highway 223 =

State highway in Texas

State Highway 223
- SH 223; highlighted in red

Route information
- Maintained by TxDOT
- Length: 1.644 mi (2.646 km)
- Existed: by 1936–present

Major junctions
- South end: US 67 / US 90 at Alpine
- North end: SH 118 in Alpine

Location
- Country: United States
- State: Texas
- Counties: Brewster

Highway system
- Highways in Texas; Interstate; US; State; Former; Toll; Loops; Spurs; FM/RM; Park; Rec
← SH 222	→ SH 224

State Highway 223 (SH 223) is a highway maintained by the Texas Department of Transportation (TxDOT) entirely within the city of Alpine in Brewster County. Unofficially, the route is locally called the Loop Road The 1.6-mile (2.6 km) route designated between 1933 and 1936 runs from the combined U.S. Route 67 and U.S. Route 90 in front of Sul Ross State University on the west side of town to SH 118 on the city's north side. There are no intersections with other highways between its termini. A number of the city's significant points of interest are located along the route.

== History ==
SH 223 was established on September 4, 1935. according to official state highway maps from that time. Before 1940, SH 223 at its southern terminus also intersected the former SH 3 which ran concurrently with US 67 and US 90 through Alpine. Since its creation, SH 223 is remarkably stable and unchanged compared to most Texas state highways of comparable age.

== Route description ==
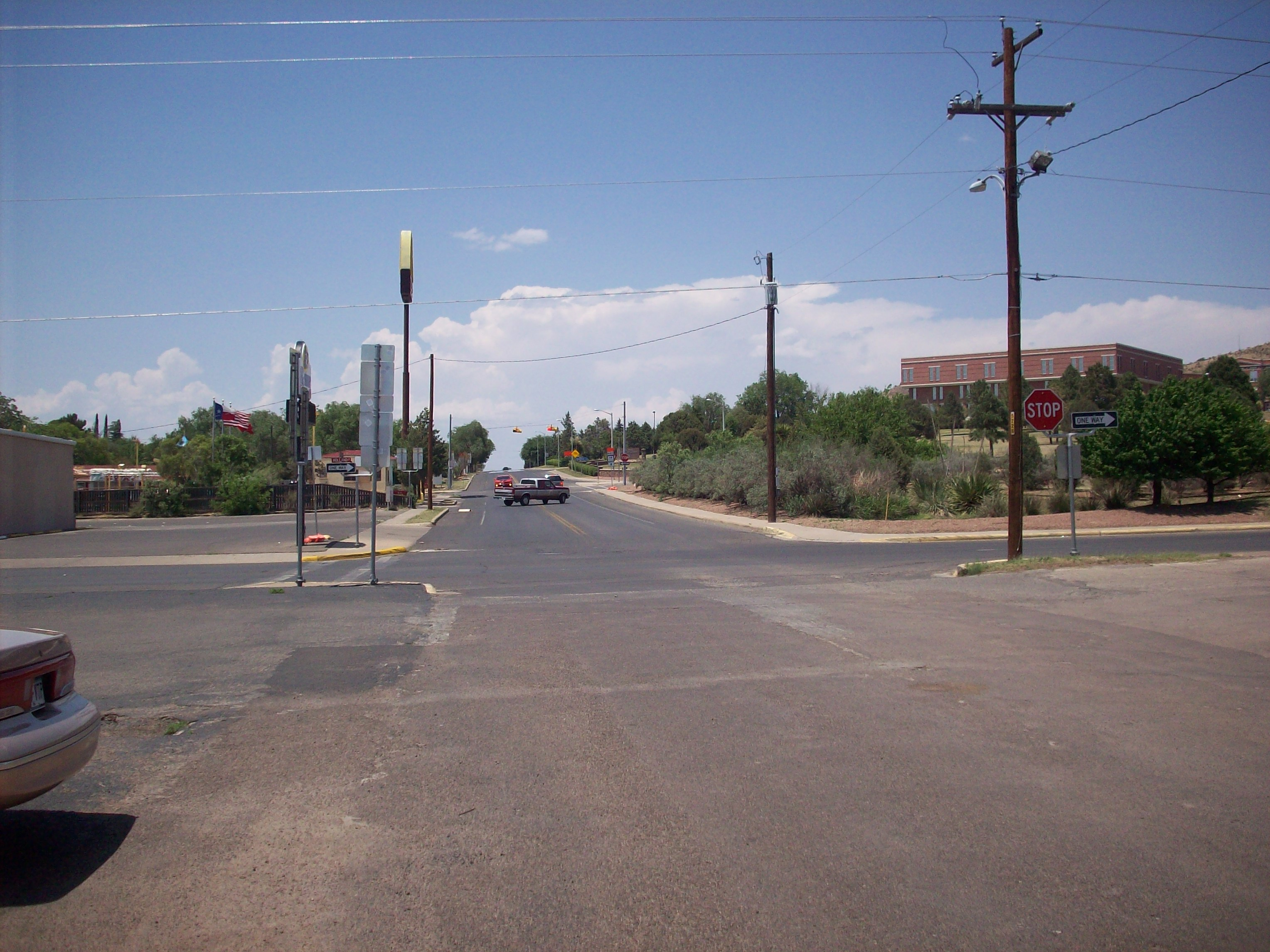
Southern terminus of SH 223 at US 67 and US 90 in Alpine. Sul Ross State University is seen on the right.

SH 223 begins at the westbound roadway of US 67 and US 90 along a one-way street Holland Ave. on Alpine's west side. the route proceeds along Harrison St. and intersects the eastbound roadway of US 67 and US 90 along another one-way street Ave. E one block north. The route continues north along Harrison St. passing directly in front of the main campus of Sul Ross State University. Beyond the university, the route passes along the base of Hancock Hill and through a residential neighborhood with off campus apartments and hillside homes. The route passes by Alpine Valley Care Center, the town's only nursing home. Continuing north, the route next goes by the Alpine Country Club next to the city's golf course. The route then passes Kokernot Lodge, a conference and recreational center belonging to SRSU that includes the Theatre of the Big Bend's outdoor amphitheater. Beyond that, the route curves sharply to the west while passing over a bridge crossing Alpine Creek. After this sharp curve, the route becomes Hendryx Ave. The route then passes by the broadcast studios of radio stations KVLF and KALP-FM. The route then passes the Kokernot Field baseball stadium and Alpine High School before terminating at SH 118 on Alpine's north side.

== Major intersections ==
The entire route is in Brewster County.

Location	mi	km	Destinations	Notes
Alpine	0	0.0	US 67 north / US 90 east (Holland Ave.)	Southern terminus
Alpine	0.1	0.16	US 67 south / US 90 west (Ave. E) – Marfa	
Alpine	1.6	2.6	SH 118 – Big Bend National Park Headquarters, Fort Davis	Northern terminus
1.000 mi = 1.609 km; 1.000 km = 0.621 mi
