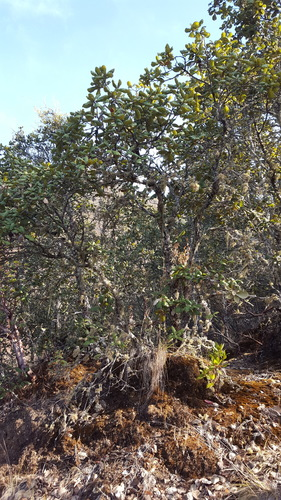

Conservation status
- Least Concern (IUCN 3.1)

Scientific classification
- Kingdom: Plantae
- Clade: Tracheophytes
- Clade: Angiosperms
- Clade: Eudicots
- Clade: Rosids
- Order: Fagales
- Family: Fagaceae
- Genus: Quercus
- Subgenus: Quercus subg. Quercus
- Section: Quercus sect. Lobatae
- Species: Q. conzattii

Binomial name
- Quercus conzattii Trel.

= Quercus conzattii =

Species of oak tree

Quercus conzattii is an oak endemic to Mexico. It is placed in Quercus section Lobatae.

== Description ==
Quercus conzattii has a varied growth habit, growing as shrub from 1 to 4 meters high, or a small to medium-sized tree 3 from 10 meters high, and rarely to 17 meters. It is often misidentified as Q. radiata or Q. urbani.

== Range and habitat ==
Quercus conzattii has a disjunct distribution across the mountains of southern and central Mexico. It is common in the Sierra Madre de Oaxaca and eastern Sierra Madre del Sur of Oaxaca state. It is also found on the eastern slope of the southern Sierra Madre Occidental of northern Jalisco, eastern Nayarit, southern Durango, and extreme western Zacatecas states.

It is found in montane forest, woodland, savanna, and shrubland habitats between 1,700 and 2,400 meters elevation. At lower elevations it grows in monospecific stands on rocky slopes and outcrops of igneous rock. At higher elevations it is commonly found in dry forests and woodlands, mixed with other dryland oaks and pines, or in savanna-like open stands on hills.

== Conservation and threats ==
Quercus conzattii has a stable population, and its conservation status is assessed Least Concern.
