= Davis Mountains State Park =

State park in Texas, United States

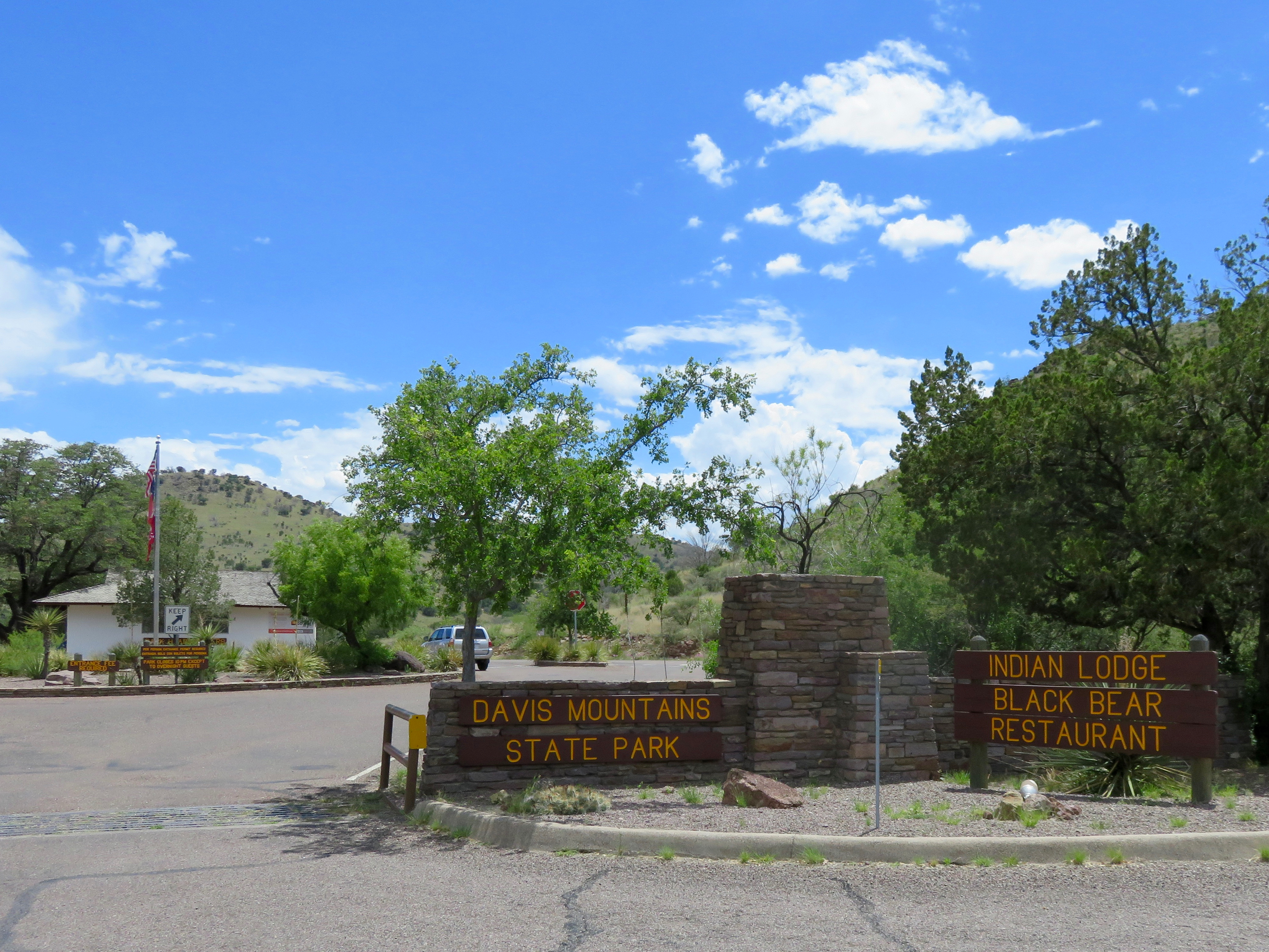
- The entrance to Davis Mountains State Park in Fort Davis, Texas.
- Location: Jeff Davis County, Texas, United States
- Nearest city: Fort Davis
- Coordinates: 30°35′45″N 103°55′58″W
- Area: 2,709 acres (1,096 ha)
- Established: 1938-1939
- Visitors: 95,874 (in 2025)
- Governing body: Texas Parks and Wildlife Department
- Website: Official site

Davis Mountains State Park is a 2,709-acre (1,096 ha) state park located in the Davis Mountains in Jeff Davis County, Texas, United States. The closest town is Fort Davis, Texas. The park is a "sky island" with an elevation between 5,000 and 6,000 ft (1,500 and 1,800 m) above sea level, and as such, gets more rainfall and cooler temperatures than the surrounding Chihuahuan Desert.

Original improvements including Indian Lodge, a full-service hotel, were accomplished by the Civilian Conservation Corps (CCC) in 1933. After this federal investment, the park was opened to the public around 1938. Indian Lodge was expanded and campground facilities were added by the state in 1967. The park and lodge are managed by the Texas Parks and Wildlife Department (TPWD).

== History ==
Interest in developing a state park in the Davis Mountains began in earnest in 1923 when the Texas Legislature directed the newly created State Parks Board to investigate the area. However, the Parks Board failed to secure any land donations and had no appropriations to buy the land.

By 1933, the Great Depression had so devastated the local economy that landowners agreed to donate 560 acres for the park. CCC Companies 879 and 881 arrived in June 1933 and began organizing their encampment, which they named Camp Washington Seawell, after the first commander of nearby Fort Davis. Their developments in the park included roads, an overlook shelter, two mess halls, stone picnic tables, fireplaces and steps, a latrine and "Indian Lodge," a motel and visitor facility.

== Features ==
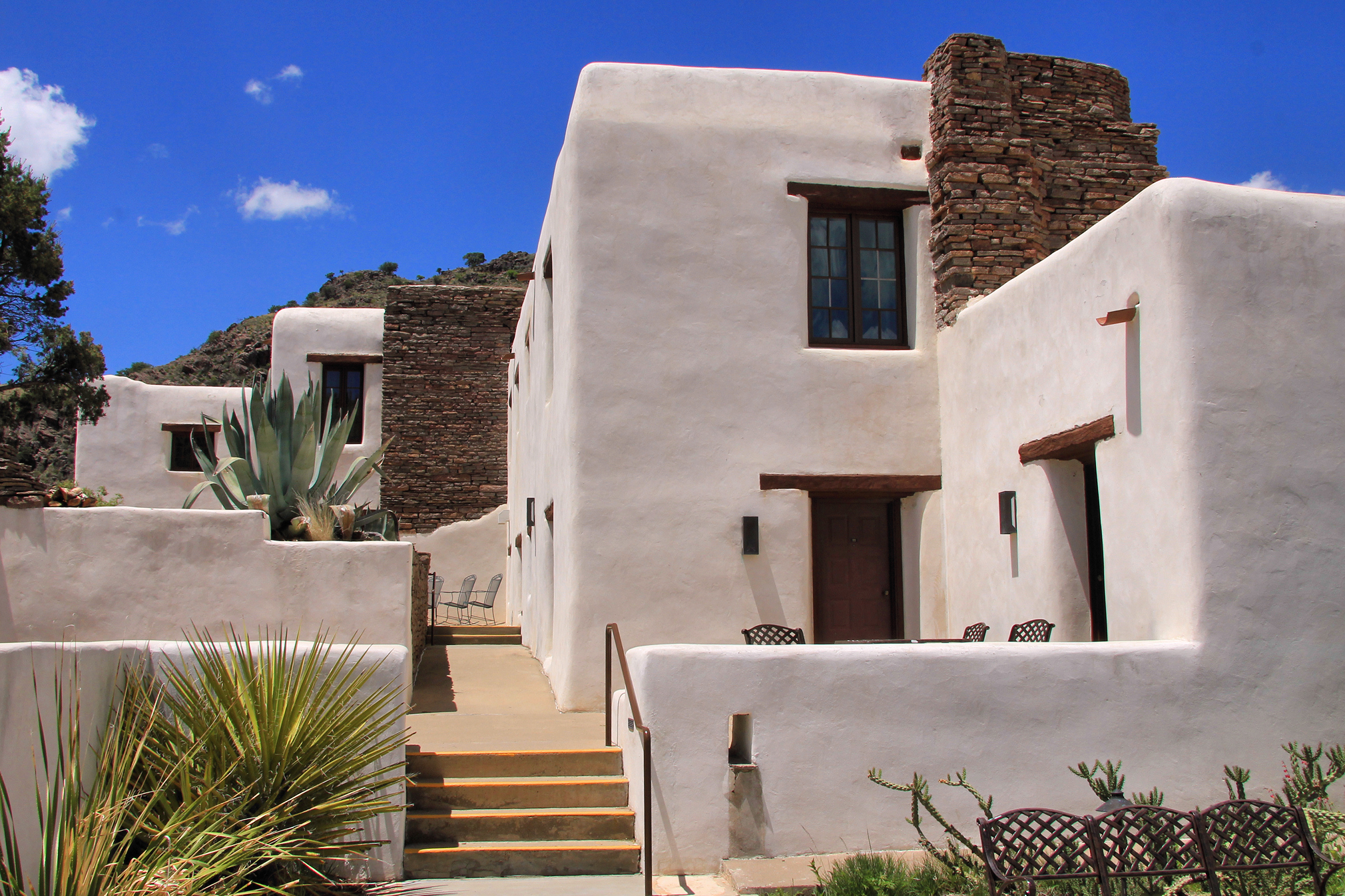
The Civilian Conservation Corps built "Indian Lodge" in the 1930s.

Within the park is the only hotel in the Texas State Parks system, Indian Lodge. It is a southwestern style adobe hotel with thirty-nine guest rooms and on-site restaurant designed to resemble a multi-level pueblo village. The Civilian Conservation Corps built sixteen guest rooms during the 1930s (completed in 1939) using handmade 18-inch-thick bricks created on site. They also hand-carved much of the furniture. The TPWD added twenty-four guest rooms, a dining room, a meeting room and a swimming pool in a 1967 expansion. The lodge shut down in January 2023 and underwent a $3.5 million renovation, reopening in May 2025. Improvements included new landscaping, windows, doors, HVAC, plumbing, electrical and irrigation systems and resurfaced pool. The number of visitors at Indian Lodge in 2025 was 8,477.

The CCC also built the five mile scenic Skyline Drive, a series of switchbacks leading to multiple trails and viewpoints overlooking the park. A large bird blind next to the main road offers enclosed and open viewing areas for the many species of birds that are attracted to the feeders near the blind. The park is next to the Fort Davis National Historic Site and the two are connected by four miles of hiking trails. The park has over six miles of hiking trails in the main unit, as well as seven miles of equestrian trails in the special use Limpia Canyon Primitive Area, the section of the park north of Texas State Highway 118.

== Nature ==
=== Animals ===
Montezuma quail are regularly observed in the park. Woodhouse's scrub jay, white-winged dove, acorn woodpecker, and curve-billed thrasher are other birds recorded. Mule deer, white-tailed deer, collared peccary and rock squirrel are among the most common wildlife species seen. Mountain lion, and American black bear are rarely seen but have been recorded in the park. Eastern black-tailed rattlesnake and canyon treefrog find homes in the canyons and creeks.

=== Plants ===
Davis Mountains State Park receives more rain than the surrounding desert. A variety of trees are found here, such as Mexican pinyon (Pinus cembroides), Emory oak (Quercus emoryi), gray oak (Quercus grisea), alligator juniper (Juniperus deppeana) and one-seed juniper (Juniperus monosperma). Shrubs such as firecrackerbush (Bouvardia ternifolia), golden-ball Lead Tree (Leucaena retusa), trompillo (Ipomoea hederifolia), evergreen sumac (Rhus virens), fragrant sumac (Rhus aromatica), Apache plume (Fallugia paradoxa), little walnut (Juglans microcarpa), tree cholla (Cylindropuntia imbricata), Torrey yucca (Yucca torreyi), catclaw acacia (Acacia greggii), and agarita (Mahonia trifoliolata) abound. Higher elevations in the Davis Mountains 6,000 to 8,360 ft (1,830 to 2,550 m) above sea level, not in the park but visible from it looking west, boast ponderosa pine (Pinus ponderosa) and quaking aspen (Populus tremuloides).

== Gallery ==
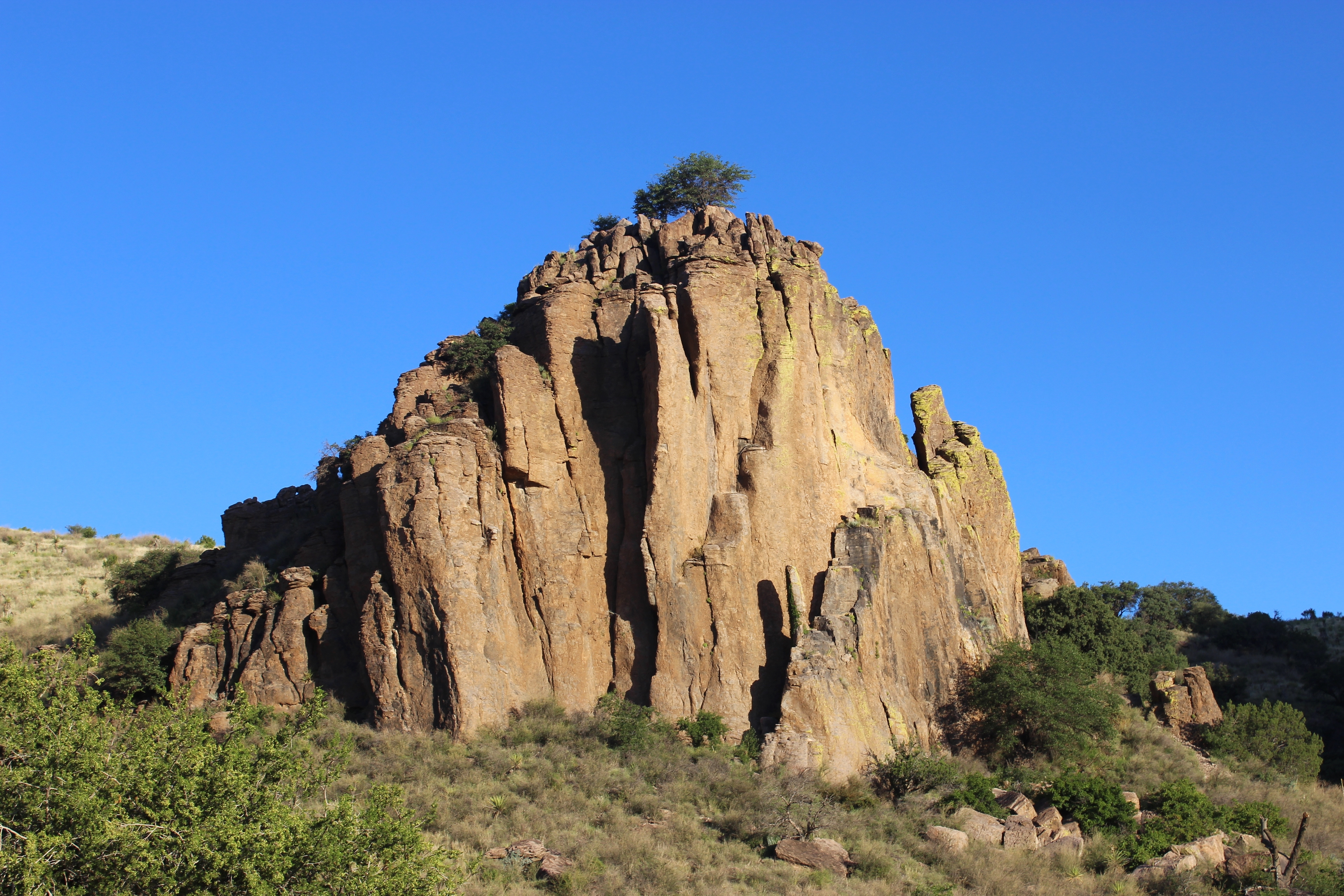
Rock outcropping along the Indian Lodge Trail

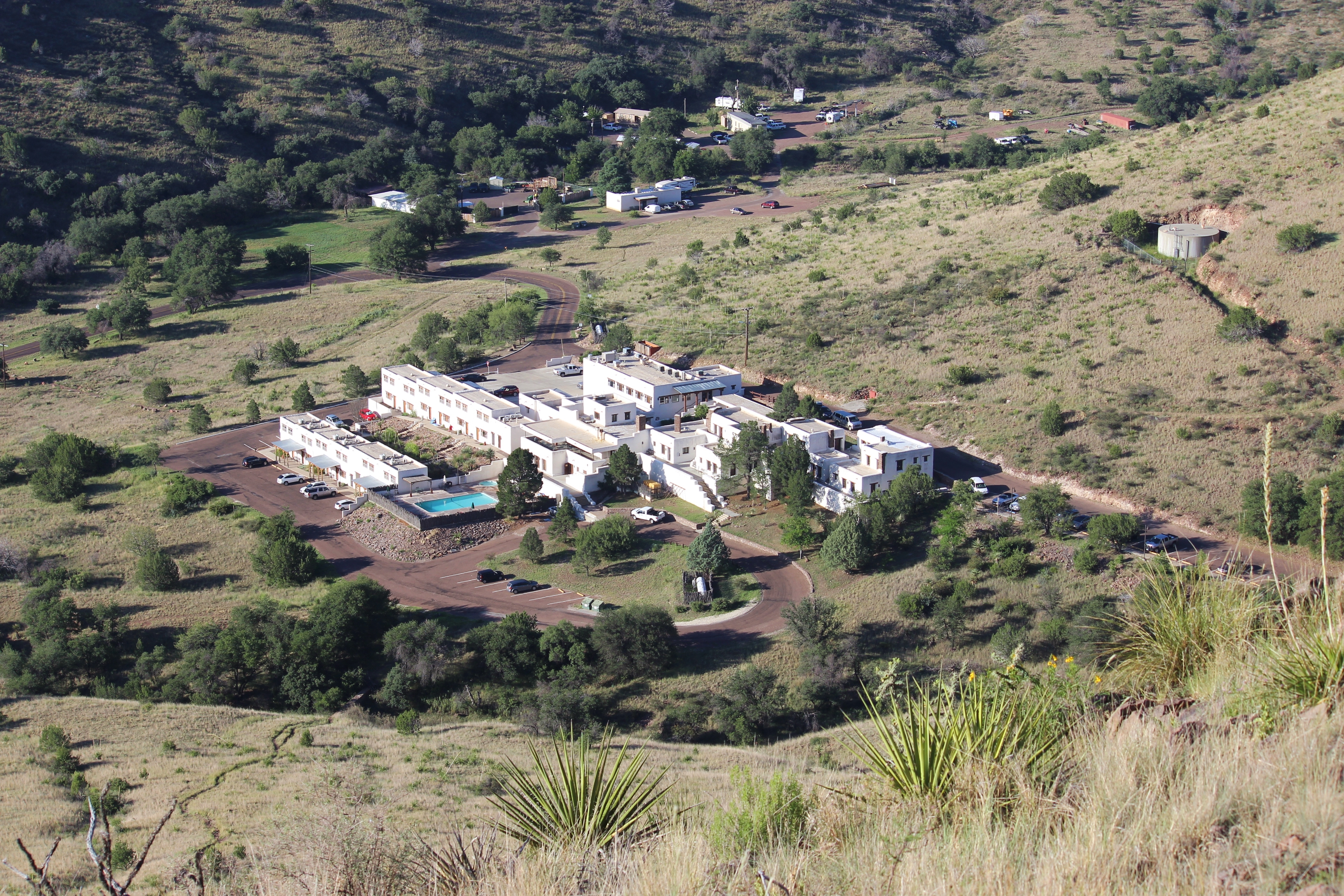
View of Indian Lodge from the Indian Lodge Trail

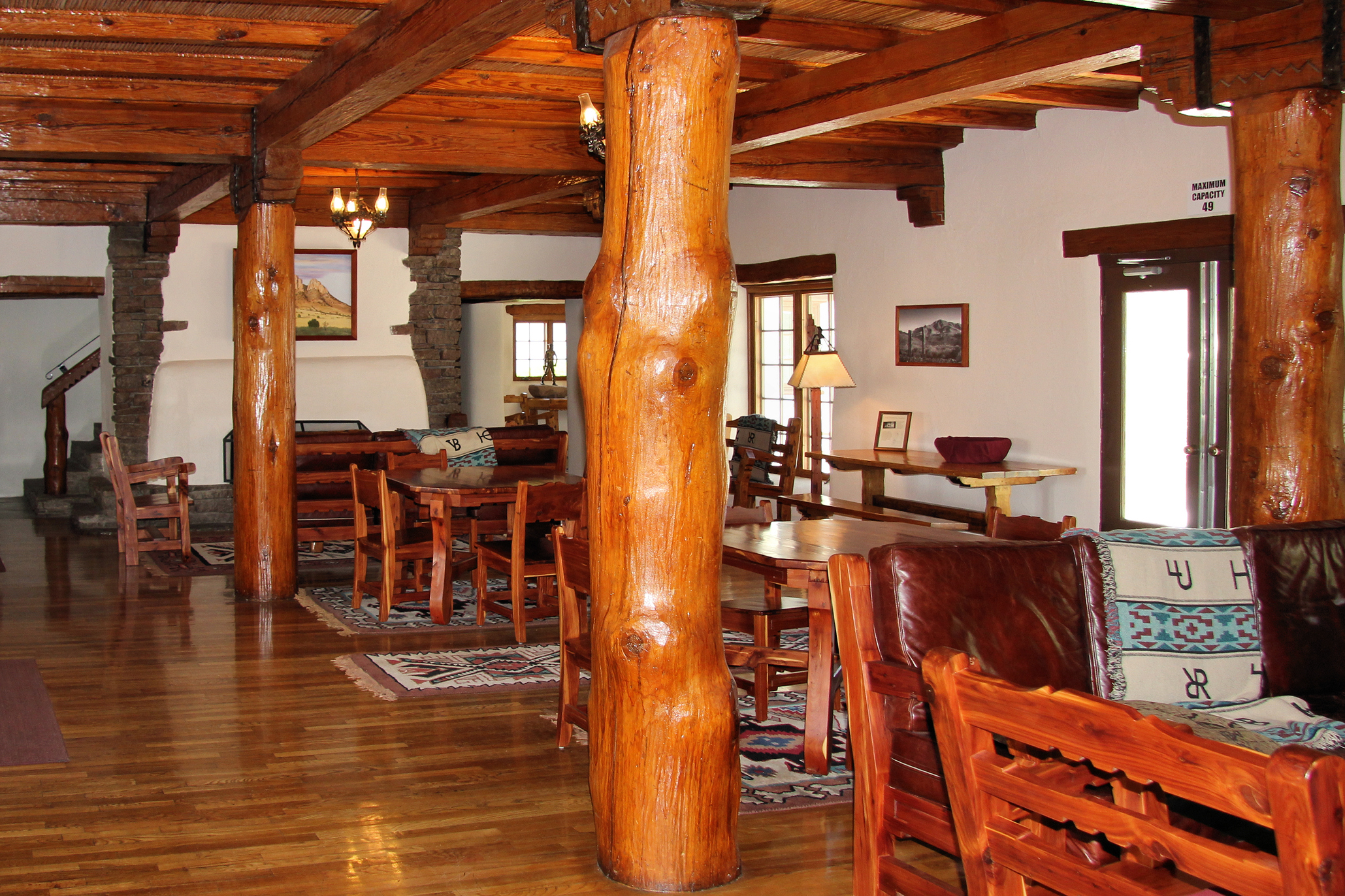
Indian Lodge lobby interior

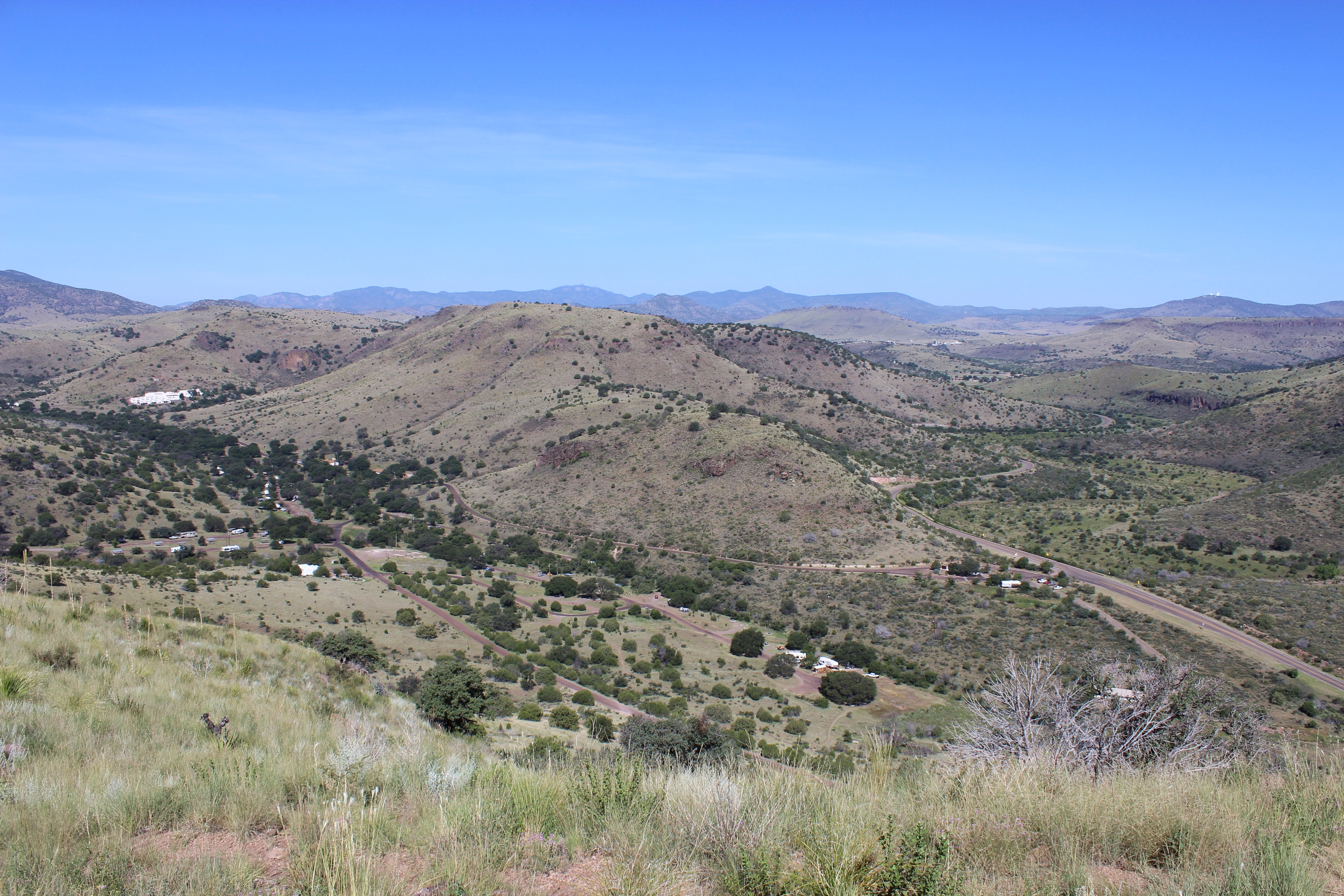
View of Davis Mountains State Park (Indian Lodge to the far left)

== See also ==
- List of Texas state parks
