= Texas Recreational Road 3 =

Highway in Texas

Recreational Road 3

Route information
- Maintained by TxDOT
- Length: 2.037 mi (3.278 km)
- Existed: June 1, 1970–present

Major junctions
- West end: FM 273 in White Shed
- East end: Old Lake Bonham Road

Location
- Country: United States
- State: Texas
- Counties: Fannin

Highway system
- Highways in Texas; Interstate; US; State; Former; Toll; Loops; Spurs; FM/RM; Park; Rec
| ← PR 3 | → SH 4 |

Recreational Road 3 (RE 3) is a Recreational Road located in Fannin County in North Texas. The 2-mile (3.2 km) long highway connects Bonham City Lake Recreation Area to Farm to Market Road 273 (FM 273) and the city of Bonham. The road travels in a generally west–east alignment through mixed rural-residential land along the southern shore of Lake Bonham. Its eastern terminus is at County Road 2619 (CR 2610) on the eastern border of the recreation area. The highway was designated in 1970 when the City of Bonham requested the Texas State Highway Commission build a highway to connect its newly created City Lake park to the state highway network. The road was constructed in 1972 after two years of delays over right-of-way issues largely over the route of an existing dirt track.

== Route description ==
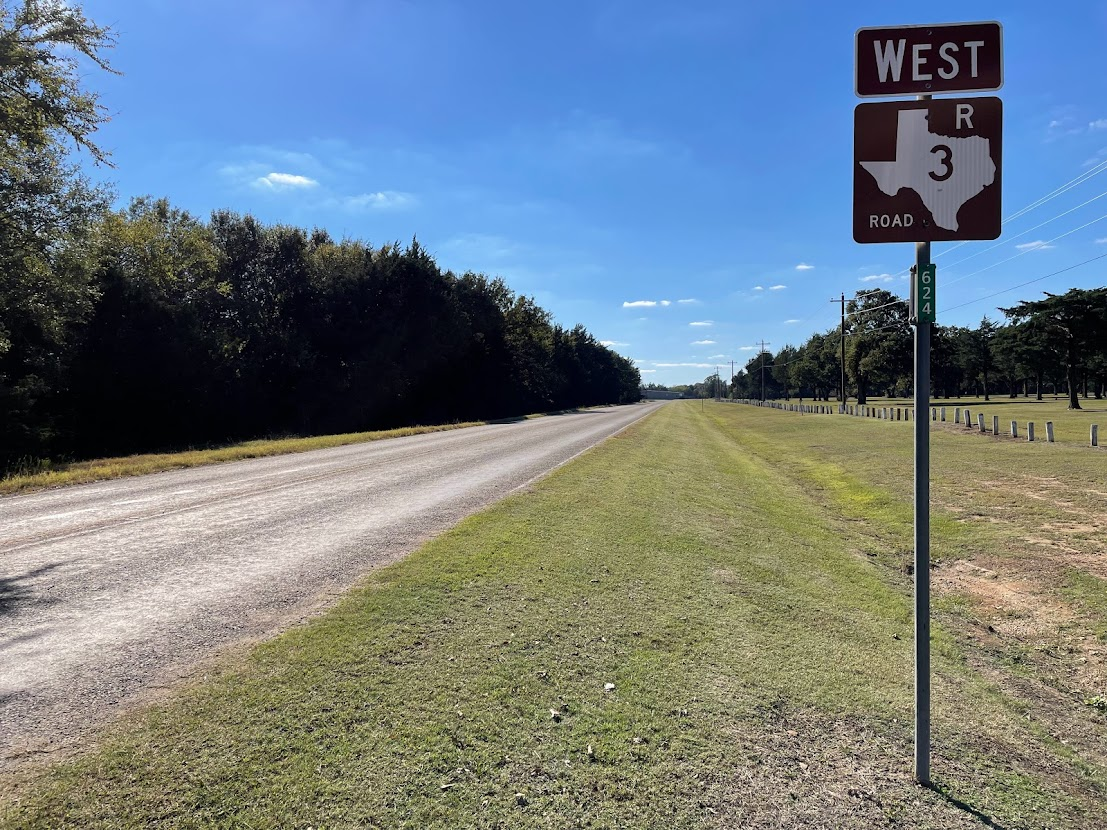
RE 3 looking westward near its eastern terminus

RE 3 begins at a T-intersection with FM 273 (White Shed Road) in the unincorporated community of White Shed approximately one mile (1.6 km) north of the city of Bonham. Along its entire length, the highway runs as a two-lane, undivided roadway. For its first 0.8 miles (1.3 km), the route travels in a northeastern direction. The roadway makes two wide bends through largely agricultural land along this stretch. After intersecting Circle Drive, approximately 0.8 miles (1.3 km) into its course, the highway travels into more residential and densely forested areas along the southern shore of Lake Bonham. Near its midpoint, the road intersects County Road 2607 (CR 2607), a residential street which travels southward. Continuing eastward, the highway passes two additional residential streets to its north and a large self storage facility to its south. After a T-intersection with CR 2608 to the south, the roadway passes Bonham City Lake Recreation Area (Lake Bonham Park) to its north. The park provides publicly accessible recreational facilities on Lake Bonham, including a boat ramp, restrooms, and camping sites. At the eastern edge of the park, the road reaches its eastern terminus, an intersection with CR 2610 (Old Bonham Lake Road), after traveling a total distance of 2.037 miles (3.278 km).

According to TxDOT, traffic along the highway is higher at its western end, which, in 2021, averaged 1,179 vehicles per day, while its eastern terminus averaged only 248 vehicles a day.

== History ==
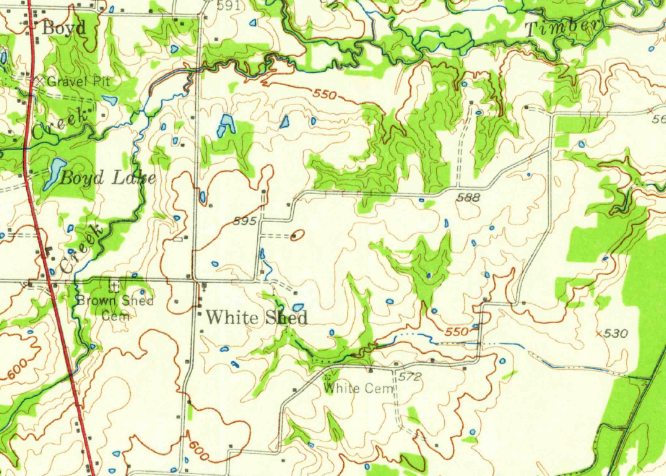
A 1959 map of the county road which preceded RE 3. The route travels west to east across the center of the map

The city of Bonham started planning Lake Bonham in 1960 as a supply source for its municipal water system. Construction of the Timber Creek Dam, which impounds the reservoir, began in 1966. In September 1969, as the reservoir was nearing completion, the Bonham Water Authority elected to develop a park which would become the Bonham City Lake Recreation Area. As part of the resolution, the organization sent a request to the Texas Highway Department for a paved road to the site.

At its April 1970 meeting, the Highway Commission, in response to increasing requests for the construction of park access roads, created the Recreational Road program and set aside $25 million (equivalent to $155 million in 2024) in funds for new construction under the system. Routes RE 255 and RE 2, were added to the system at the meeting. At its following session in May, the Highway Commission approved the Bonham Water Authority's request and designated the Lake Bonham park road as the third route in the Recreational Road system. The Highway Department estimated that construction of the roadway would cost approximately $111,000 (equivalent to $690,000 in 2024).

The Commission's initial proposal called for a 2.2-mile-long (3.5 km) highway to be built along the course of an existing county road. This route had existed since at least 1940, when it was an unimproved dirt farm road; by 1959, it had been upgraded to a graded, light-duty dirt road. The proposed improvements included upgrading the surface to all-weather asphalt pavement and smoothing out three sharp curves along the existing route. A public hearing on the proposal was held on December 30, 1970. Ahead of this hearing, on December 14, the Bonham city council voted to endorse the Highway Commission's proposed route, though the vote was largely symbolic as the city held no control over routing or right-of-way of the highway. At the hearing, the state's proposal was supported by local officials, including the county Commissioners' Court, Bonham Water Authority, and Bonham Chamber of Commerce. Local residents, by contrast, raised objections over the routing of the highway, in particular the curve adjustments. One landowner along the proposed route was recorded saying he "was for the road, but not where you are putting it".

Acquiring right-of-way for the roadway proceeded slowly. Much of the land required for RE 3 was already owned by either Fannin County or the Bonham Water Authority, but about six acres (2.4 ha) along the proposed route belonged to private landowners. While a contemporary news article speculated that construction on the route might begin before the end of 1971, by November of that year, only two-thirds of the required land deeds had been acquired by the county. The final right-of-way was not received until January 1972.

An initial invitation for bids to construct the roadway in February 1972 was unsuccessful, after which a second round of bidding was opened at the June meeting of the State Highway Commission. The R.W. McKinney Company of Nacogdoches, Texas, was awarded the construction contract with a bid of $109,428.45 (equivalent to $620,474 in 2024). Construction on the highway began in late July. Highway Department officials projected that the route would be completed by October 15. Weather delays, however, prevented the paving of the last portions of the route in time for an official opening ceremony for the lake and park on October 27.

== Major intersections ==
The entire highway is in Fannin County.

| Location | mi | km | Destinations | Notes |
|---|---|---|---|---|
| White Shed | 0.000 | 0.000 | FM 273 | Western terminus |
| | 1.279 | 2.058 | CR 2607 | |
| | 1.749 | 2.815 | CR 2608 | |
| | 2.037 | 3.278 | Old Lake Bonham Road (CR 2610) | Eastern terminus |
1.000 mi = 1.609 km; 1.000 km = 0.621 mi
