= Texas State Highway 118 =

State highway in Texas

State Highway 118
- SH 118, highlighted in red

Route information
- Maintained by TxDOT
- Length: 155.272 mi (249.886 km)
- Existed: by 1928–present

Major junctions
- South end: Big Bend National Park
- US 67 / US 90 at Alpine; SH 223 at Alpine; SH 17 at Fort Davis; SH 166 near Valentine
- North end: I-10 / RM 2424 at Kent

Location
- Country: United States
- State: Texas
- Counties: Brewster, Jeff Davis, Culberson

Highway system
- Highways in Texas; Interstate; US; State; Former; Toll; Loops; Spurs; FM/RM; Park; Rec
← SH 117	→ SH 119

State Highway 118 (SH 118) is a 155.3-mile (249.9 km) state highway in the U.S. state of Texas that runs from Big Bend National Park north to Kent and passes through the towns of Study Butte, Alpine, and Fort Davis. SH 118 is maintained by the Texas Department of Transportation (TxDOT). The road lies entirely within the Trans-Pecos region of Texas. SH 118 is a two-lane road along its length except for a section in Alpine where the route follows the path of U.S. Route 67 and U.S. Route 90. All of the route except for the 2.8-mile (4.5 km) section between Big Bend National Park and Farm to Market Road 170 is included in the Texas Historical Commission's Texas Mountain Trail.

The road passes through or along several state and federal parks and other wildlife preservation areas. These include Big Bend National Park and Fort Davis National Historic Site of the National Park Service, Elephant Mountain Wildlife Management Area and Davis Mountains State Park operated by the Texas Parks and Wildlife Department, and the Davis Mountains Preserve of the Nature Conservancy of Texas. The road is in the Chihuahuan Desert and passes mostly through scrub land except in the higher elevations of the Davis Mountains where the road encounters forested sky islands. The road also provides access to the University of Texas at Austin's McDonald Observatory.

== History ==

In 1927, the Texas Legislature authorized the Texas Highway Department, a precursor agency to TxDOT, to construct Davis Mountains State Park Highway after what was then the State Parks Board had failed to acquire parkland for a state park within the Davis Mountains. The road was to include portions of the present SH 118 and State Highway 166 now known as the Davis Mountains Scenic Loop. On August 17, 1926, SH 118 was designated from Marfa to Presidio. On March 19, 1929, the route was extended north to Fort Davis. On May 1, 1931, SH 118 was replaced by SH 17 and SH 118 was instead assigned on the old route of SH 3 from Alpine to Fort Davis which was completed. By 1932, the parks board finally acquired land for a park ending the need for a park highway. The road, which had then been built from Fort Davis to Fowlkes Ranch, was designated as SH 166. On December 22, 1936, SH 118 was extended south to Terlingua.

On September 26, 1939 when the state highway commission approved the General Redesignation of the State Highway System and created the state's Highway Designation Files, SH 118 had been extended north to Kent, replacing SH 233. With this new designation, the route was largely the same as the present with the exception of taking a more westerly path at a point near Adobe Walls Mountain in southern Brewster County in order to terminate at Terlingua rather than Study Butte; although, except for the stretch between Alpine and Fowlkes Ranch, the road was unpaved and even classified as primitive in places. The stretch of the road through Fort Davis to the present intersection with SH 166 at Nunn Hill was concurrent with SH 166. On October 30 of that same year, a spur route of former State Highway 227 was designated as an extension of SH 118 causing the road to terminate at SH 227. This extension followed the easternmost path of present-day FM 170 to its terminus, and then down the southernmost stretch of the present SH 118 and the westernmost portion of the current park road ending at the intersection of what is now the Old Maverick Road within the present Big Bend National Park.

On May 29, 1941, the state canceled the designation of SH 118 from Alpine to SH 227 with the Terlingua Spur between Terlingua and SH 227 receiving the designation of State Spur 121 and the portion between Terlingua and Alpine reverting to county jurisdiction. On November 24 of that same year, SH 166 was given its present termini with its concurrent designation over SH 118 from Fort Davis to Nunn Hill dropped. The cancellation of the route south of Alpine was short lived. On January 8, 1946, SH 118 was extended south 10.0 miles (16.1 km) from Alpine. On February 20, 1946, Spur 121 was cancelled because the portion in the park was taken over by the National Park service and the remainder was remote from the state highway system, making it uneconomical to maintain. On September 9, 1947, SH 118 was extended south 10.0 miles (16.1 km). On January 27, 1949, SH 118 was extended south 20.0 miles (32.2 km). On July 15, 1949, SH 118 was extended south 20.0 miles (32.2 km). On July 25, 1951, SH 118 was extended south 10.0 miles (16.1 km). On December 18, 1951, SH 118 was extended south 11.0 miles (17.7 km) to its current terminus.

== Route description ==
SH 118 is within Brewster, Jeff Davis, and Culberson counties.

=== Brewster County ===
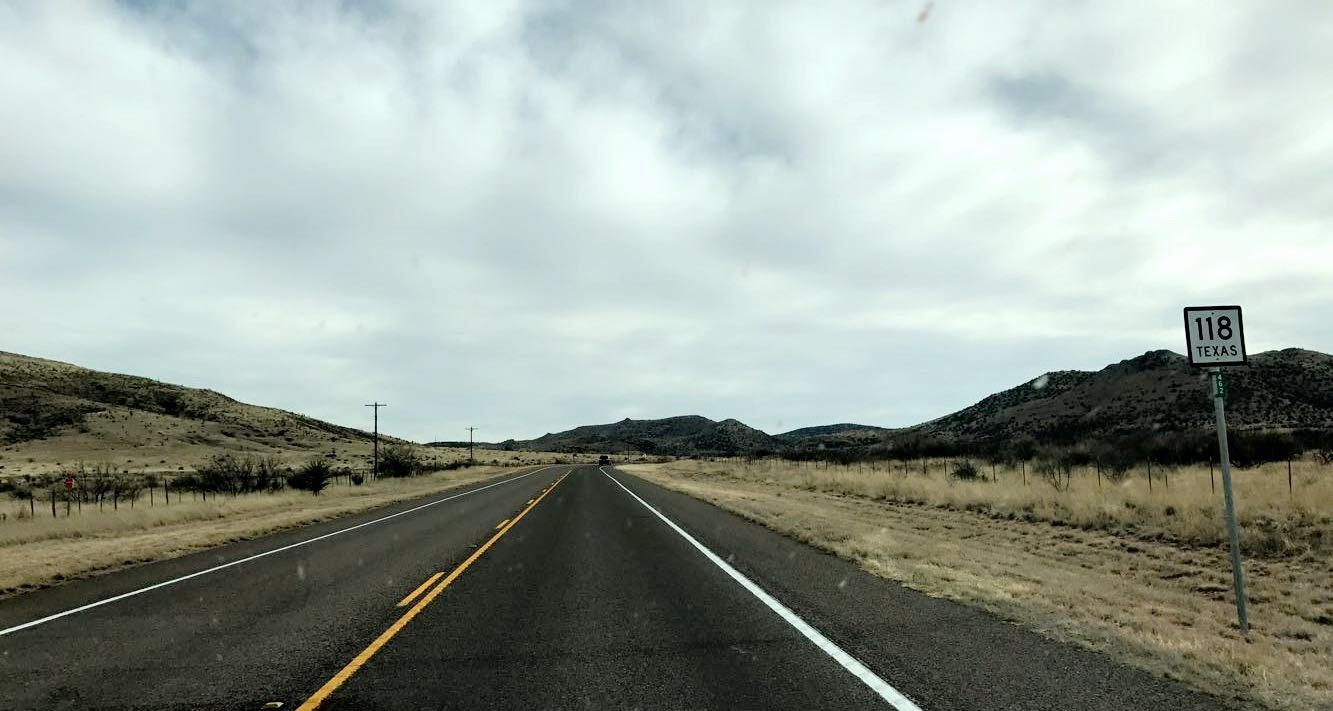
Texas State Highway 118 in Brewster County, approaching Terlingua and Big Bend National Park

The section of SH 118 within Brewster County makes up a majority of the route's length at 89.7 miles (144.4 km). The route begins where the roadway from Big Bend National Park's headquarters reaches the park's western entrance, and then proceeds a short distance to Study Butte. At Study Butte, SH 118 intersects FM 170 to Terlingua and Lajitas, and then proceeds along the Rio Grande to Presidio. Although the area around Study Butte is mountainous, the route through much of southern Brewster County is composed of long, straight stretches through arid ranch land as the road slowly climbs in elevation as its distance from the Rio Grande increases. Between Study Butte and Alpine, there are no major intersections, only junctions with unpaved county roads serving ranches and roads into remote residential subdivisions.

Beyond a roadside picnic table near Crossen Mesa past the entrance to Elephant Mountain Wildlife Management Area, the road begins to enter the Davis Mountains. The road then becomes winding as it passes through the mountainous terrain. In this portion, there is another group of roadside picnic tables with a view of Cathedral Mountain. The road at one hill near Alpine has tight turns and steep grades as the road approaches the plateau where Alpine is situated. There is a U.S. Immigration and Customs Enforcement checkpoint south of Alpine.

The road enters Alpine as South Walker Street passing along the eastern edge of Alpine Hill. SH 118 then makes a left and right curve to move one block further west on South Cockrell Street to pass along the western side of Sul Ross State University's Jackson Field football stadium. The road then crosses the Union Pacific Railroad and intersects U.S. Route 67 and U.S. Route 90. US 67 and US 90 overlay each other, and their route through the central part of the city passes along two one-way two-lane streets one block from each other. SH joins this overlay, with its northbound route following west on East Avenue E toward Marfa and its southbound route one block south on East Holland Avenue toward Marathon and Fort Stockton. SH 118 leaves the overlay going northward at North Fifth Street. On the city's north side, SH 118 leaves the street grid and intersects State Highway 223, a short highway passing around Alpine's northeastern quadrant to US 67 and US 90 at Sul Ross State University. SH 118 then crosses the South Orient Rail Line and passes by Alpine Casparis Municipal Airport before leaving town following a straight stretch to the county line.

=== Jeff Davis County ===
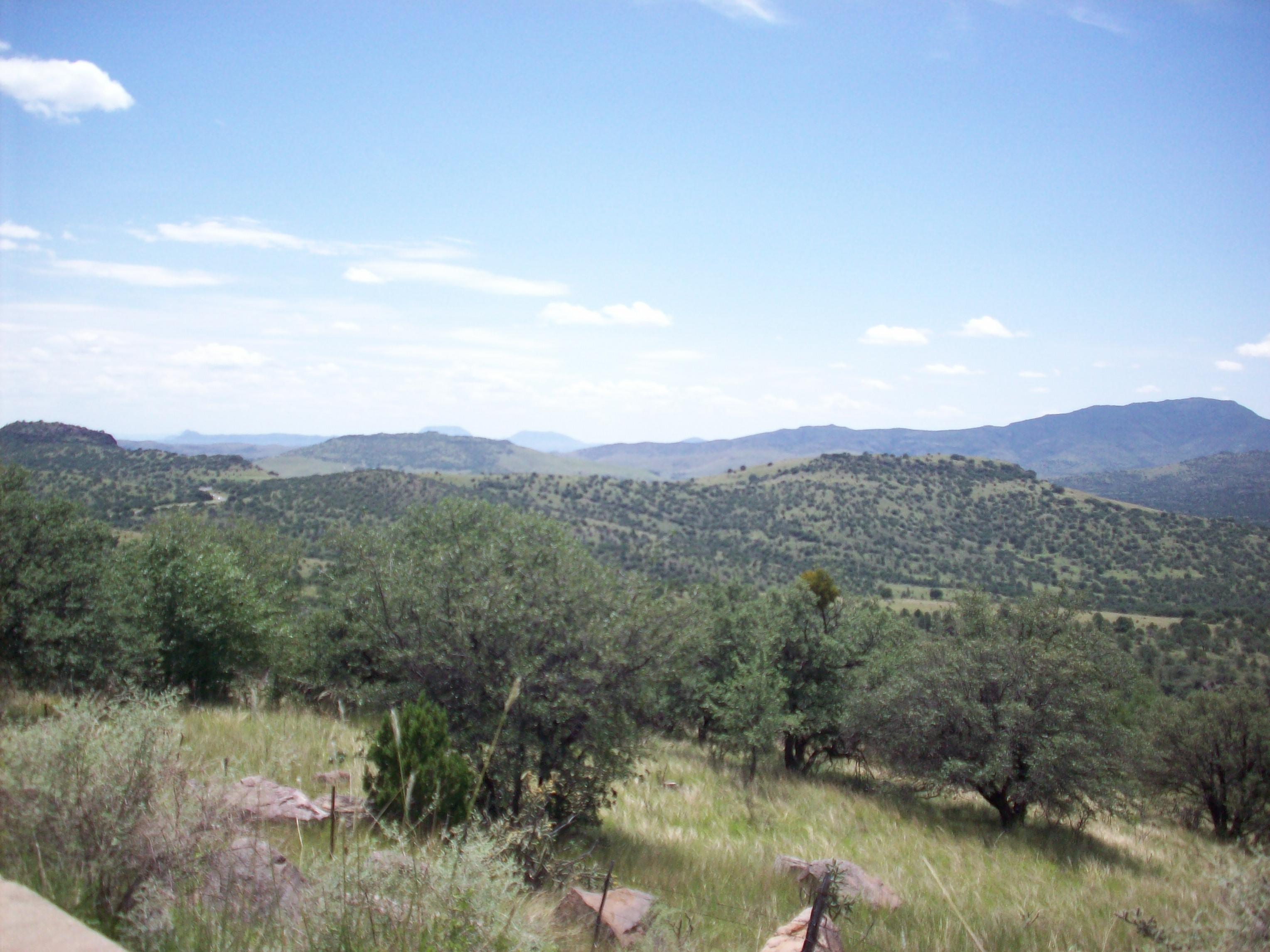
View of Davis Mountains from SH 118 at Mt. Locke with downhill section of SH 118 at left

SH 118 passes through Jeff Davis County for 66.2 miles (106.5 km). As the road enters the county, the road intersects Ranch to Market Road 1837 to the Girl Scouts of the USA's Camp Mitre Peak, then SH 118 enters Musquiz Canyon where the road again becomes winding with occasional steep grades and sharp curves. There is another collection of roadside picnic tables near the ruins of the Musquiz pioneer homestead on the highway's right of way within the canyon. After this, the road emerges from the canyon near the Chihuahuan Desert Research Institute and passes along a plateau toward Fort Davis.

The road enters Fort Davis as Musquiz Drive and intersects State Highway 17 at South State Street. SH 118 then follows SH 17 through town along State St. passing by the entrance to Fort Davis National Historic Site at Lt. Flipper Drive. The road then passes along the eastern park boundary until SH 118 separates from SH 17 on the north edge of town. SH 118 then follows Canyon Drive out of town along the north boundary of the national historic site into Limpia Canyon.

The road then enters Davis Mountains State Park where it intersects State Park Road 3. The road then proceeds toward Mount Locke and McDonald Observatory with many roadside picnic tables between Fort Davis and the observatory. The route toward the observatory has numerous steep grades and tight curves. At Mt. Locke, SH 118 intersects State Highway Spur 78 which proceeds the rest of the way toward McDonald Observatory.

Beyond the observatory at Eppenauer Ranch, the road becomes much more rugged with narrower lanes and only grass shoulders. The road continues through steep grades and curves requiring slow speeds through the forested higher elevations of the Davis Mountains. Along this stretch to the intersection at SH 166, the roadway is often not fenced and cattle guards cross the road. Loose livestock pose a hazard to motorist in this portion of the road. In this section of the road is the Lawrence E. Woods Park in Madera Canyon, a roadside drive with five picnic tables amidst a grove of Ponderosa Pines that is also the trail head of a 2.5-mile (4.0 km) Davis Mountains Preserve hiking trail. After the intersection with SH 166 toward Valentine, SH 118 alternates between straight and mountainous stretches for the remainder of the distance in the county.

=== Culberson County ===
The Culberson County portion of SH 118 is the shortest at 1.5 miles (2.4 km). The road continues north through ranch land with no intersections with public roads until it terminates at Kent at the edge of the northern foothills of the Davis Mountains. At its terminus, the road overpasses Interstate 10. Beyond the terminus at I-10, the roadway itself continues northward as Ranch to Market Road 2424.

== Major intersections ==
County	Location	mi	km	Destinations	Notes
Brewster		0	0.0	Big Bend National Park road	Route begins at BBNP west entrance
Brewster	Study Butte	2.8	4.5	FM 170 – Terlingua	
Brewster	Alpine	80.3	129.2	South Cockrell Street	SH 118 enters town on South Walker Street then curves one block west
Brewster	Alpine	80.5	129.6	US 67 (East Holland Avenue East (eastbound)) / US 90 – Marathon, Fort Stockton	SH 118 southbound overlay of US 67/US 90 ends
Brewster	Alpine	80.6	129.7	US 67 (East Avenue East (westbound)) / US 90	SH 118 northbound overlays US 67/US 90
Brewster	Alpine	81.0	130.4	US 67 (East Avenue East (westbound)) / US 90 – Marfa	SH 118 follows North 5th Street; southbound overlay begins one block south at East Holland Avenue East
Brewster	Alpine	81.9	131.8	North 5th Street	
Brewster	Alpine	82.1	132.1	SH 223 (East Hendryx Avenue East)	
Jeff Davis		91.0	146.5	RM 1837	Mitre Peak Girl Scout Camp
Jeff Davis	Fort Davis	104.8	168.7	SH 17 (State Street) – Marfa	SH 118 (Musquiz Drive) merges with SH 17
Jeff Davis	Fort Davis	105.7	170.1	Lt. Flipper Drive	Fort Davis National Historic Site
Jeff Davis	Fort Davis	106.1	170.8	SH 17 (State Street) – Balmorhea	SH 118 follows Canyon Drive out of town
Jeff Davis		108.9	175.3	PR 3 (Davis Mountains Park Road)	Davis Mountains State Park
Jeff Davis		120.1	193.3	Spur 78 (McDonald Observatory Spur)	McDonald Observatory
Jeff Davis		134.2	216.0	SH 166 – Valentine	
Culberson	Kent	157.3	253.1	I-10 / RM 2424 – Van Horn, Balmorhea, Pecos	Northern terminus
1.000 mi = 1.609 km; 1.000 km = 0.621 mi
