= Quercus pennivenia =

Scientific classification
- Kingdom: Plantae
- Clade: Tracheophytes
- Clade: Angiosperms
- Clade: Eudicots
- Clade: Rosids
- Order: Fagales
- Family: Fagaceae
- Genus: Quercus
- Subgenus: Quercus subg. Quercus
- Section: Quercus sect. Lobatae
- Species: Q. pennivenia

Binomial name
- Quercus pennivenia Trel.

Species of plant

Quercus pennivenia is a species of oak in the family Fagaceae, native to northern Mexico.

== Taxonomy ==
Quercus pennivenia was first described by William Trelease in 1924. It was later synonymized with Quercus urbani, but was restored as an independent species in 2020. It is placed in Quercus sect. Lobatae.

== Distribution ==
Quercus pennivenia is endemic to Mexico, from northern and southeastern Sinaloa to southwestern Durango.
