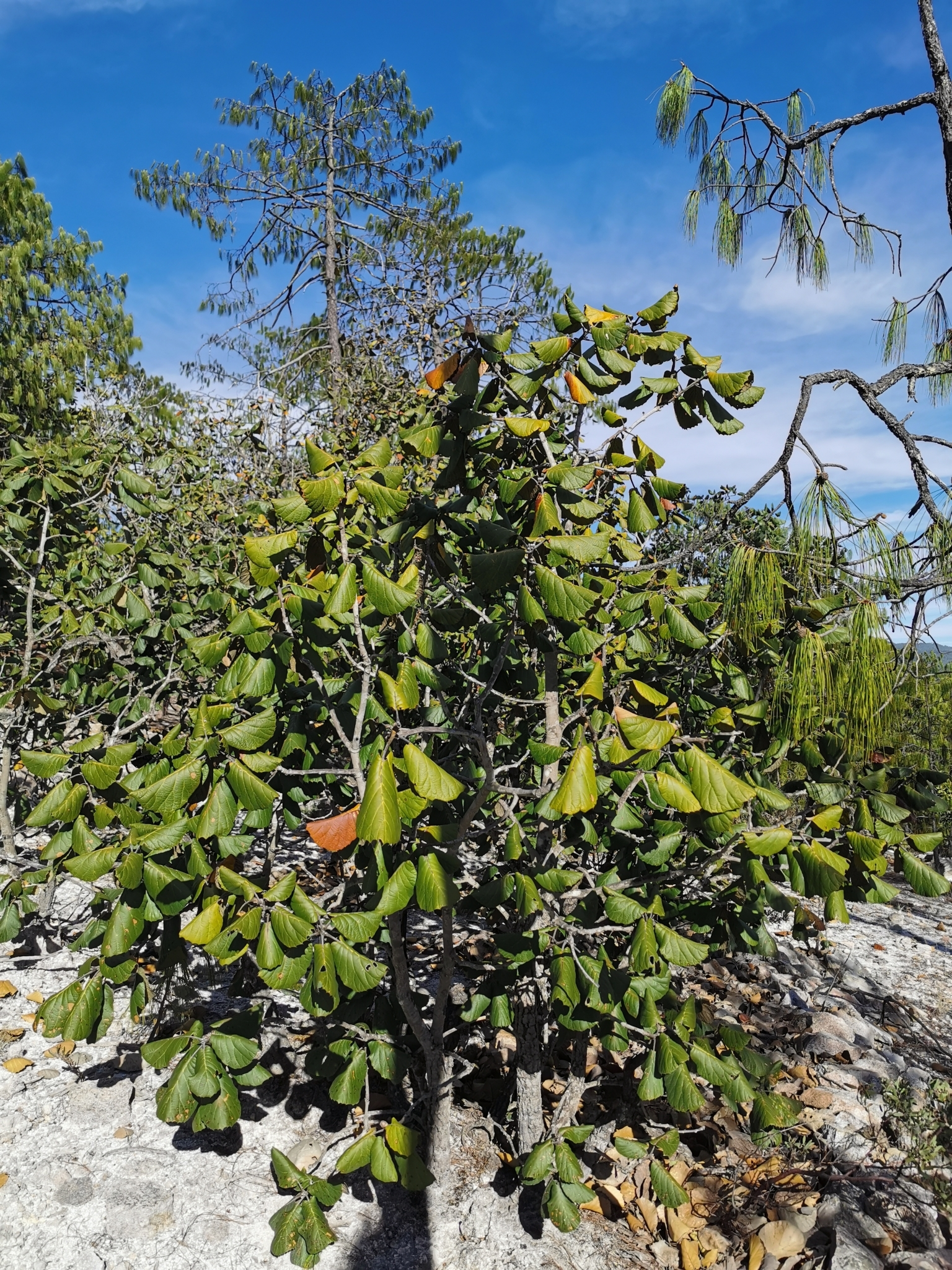

Conservation status
- Least Concern (IUCN 3.1)

Scientific classification
- Kingdom: Plantae
- Clade: Embryophytes
- Clade: Tracheophytes
- Clade: Spermatophytes
- Clade: Angiosperms
- Clade: Eudicots
- Clade: Rosids
- Order: Fagales
- Family: Fagaceae
- Genus: Quercus
- Subgenus: Quercus subg. Quercus
- Section: Quercus sect. Lobatae
- Species: Q. urbani

Binomial name
- Quercus urbani Trel.

= Quercus urbani =

Species of oak tree

Quercus urbani, also known as Quercus urbanii, is a species of oak. It is native to western and central Mexico from Sinaloa, Durango, and Zacatecas to Oaxaca. It was previously synonymized with Quercus pennivenia, but this was restored as an independent species in 2020.

== Description ==
Quercus urbani is a deciduous tree up to 10 metres (33 feet) tall with a trunk as much as 30 centimetres (12 inches) in diameter. The leaves are thick and leathery, up to 30 cm long, broadly egg-shaped (almost round), with pointed teeth along the edges.

== Distribution and habitat ==
Quercus urbani is native to central Mexico (south to northern Guerrero). While still synonymized with Quercus pennivenia, it was said to have a disjunct distribution across several mountain ranges in Mexico, including the western slope of the southern Sierra Madre Occidental, the south-central Trans-Mexican Volcanic Belt including the Sierra de Taxco, and the Sierra Madre del Sur.

Quercus urbani found on reddish sterile igneous soil, between 1,800 and 2,200 meters elevation. It typically grows in monspecific stands, and sometimes with pines and other oaks. In pine forests it is often associated with Pinus lumholtzii. Quercus urbani forms a lower woody stratum with young P. lumholtzii trees, Quercus crassifolia, Juniperus deppeana, and Nolina durangensis.
