= Davis Mountains =

Range of mountains in West Texas, United States

- Limpia Mountains
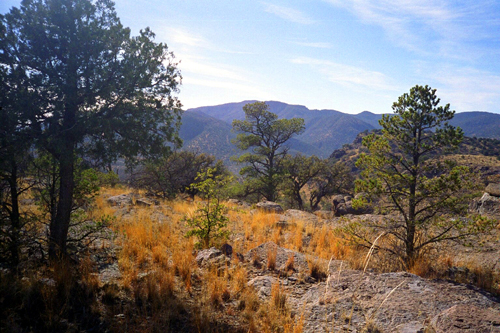
- View from Remington Ridge

Highest point
- Peak: Baldy Peak atop Mount Livermore
- Elevation: 8,383 ft (2,555 m)
- Coordinates: 30°38′N 104°10′W

Geography
- Location within Texas
- Country: United States
- State: Texas

Geology
- Rock age: Paleogene
- Rock type: Igneous

The Davis Mountains, originally known as Limpia Mountains, are a range of mountains in West Texas, United States, located near Fort Davis, after which they are named. The fort was named for then-United States Secretary of War and later Confederate President Jefferson Davis. They are a popular site for camping and hiking and the region includes Fort Davis National Historic Site and Davis Mountains State Park. The historical and architectural value of the fort, alongside the rugged natural environment of the park are a significant destination for tourism in Texas.

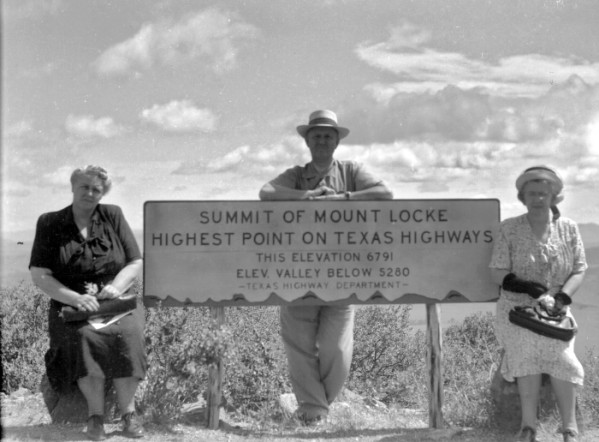
Summit of Mount Locke

Most of the land in the Davis Mountains is under private ownership as ranch land, but the Nature Conservancy owns or has conservation easements on more than 100,000 acres (40,000 ha).

== Description ==
Rather than being a single coherent range, the Davis Mountains are an irregular jumble of isolated peaks and ridges separated by flatter areas. The mountains occupy a rough square about 50 km (31 mi) on each side. The mountains are of volcanic origin composed of strata associated with eruptions of the Trans-Pecos Volcanic Field 35 million years ago. The highest peak in the Davis Mountains is Mount Livermore at 2,555 m (8,383 ft) the fifth-highest peak in Texas.

== Vegetation ==
The Davis Mountains are a sky island, an isolated mountain range surrounded by desert. The town of Fort Davis at the foot of the Davis Mountains has an elevation of 1,500 m (4,900 ft). From that elevation, the sky island rises to 2,555 m (8,383 ft). As the elevation increases, average temperatures decline and precipitation increases, permitting an "island" of forest and other mesic habitat at higher elevations.

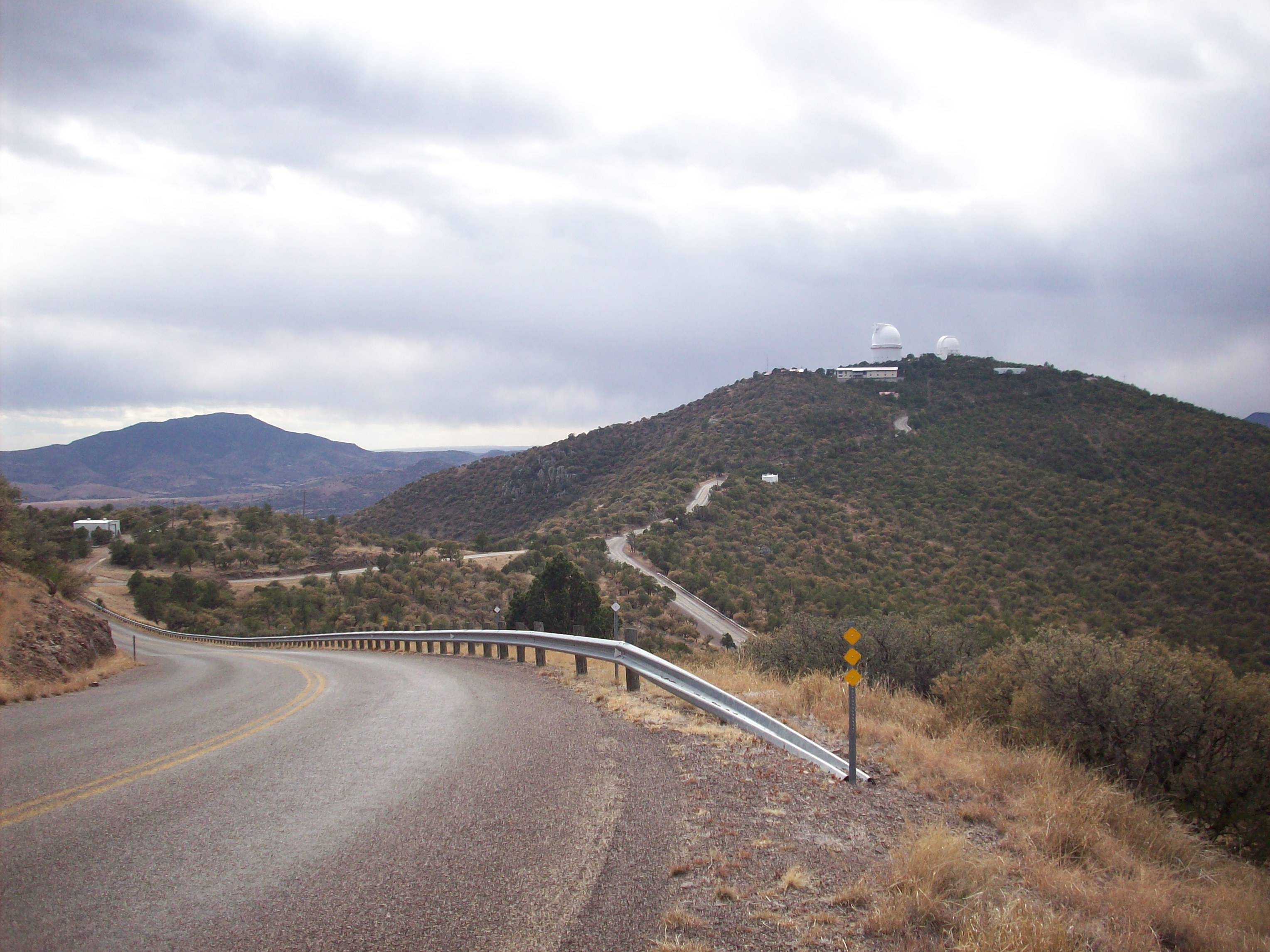
The McDonald Observatory is situated at an elevation of 2,070 m (6,790 ft).

The most common vegetation of the Davis Mountains is montane grassland, often mixed with scattered bushes and trees. As is common in most Northern Hemisphere semiarid climates, the vegetation on the southern slopes of the mountains is noticeably sparser than on the northern slopes. This is due to the greater exposure to the sun on southern slopes, thus warmer temperatures and drier soils.

Mixed in with the grassland, and usually at higher elevations, are four woodland and forest zones. First, at elevations below 1,900 m (6,200 ft) and at higher, drier elevations, the dominant tree species is the alligator juniper mixed with oak species and pinyon pine. Secondly, woodlands with pinyon pine as the most common species are found on steep slopes at elevations of 1,750 to 2,400 m (5,740 to 7,870 ft). Third, woodlands in which the gray oak is the most common tree and mixed with other oak species are also found on steep slopes at elevations of 1,900 to 2,400 m (6,200 to 7,900 ft). The gray oak woodlands are found in slightly moister soils than the pinyon woodlands.

The richest and most diverse of the woodlands and forests in the Davis Mountains are the mesic forests found from 1,770 to 2,330 m (5,810 to 7,640 ft). These forests are found in stream valleys and other well-watered areas. Indicator species are ponderosa pine and southwestern white pine, plus two small groves of quaking aspen at elevations of 2,300 m (7,500 ft) at the base of the cliffs surrounding the summit of Mount Livermore. Aspens are more characteristic of the higher elevations in the Rocky Mountains. The mesic woodlands are remnants of past glacial ages in which the climate of West Texas was more humid and cooler than at present.

== Fauna ==
Over 277 species of birds have been seen at Davis Mountains State Park. Many species found here are characteristic of more northerly mountain climes or alternatively of nearby Mexico, including 10 species of hummingbirds. Large mammals found here include whitetail deer, mule deer, elk, black bear, cougar, pronghorn, peccary, and introduced species such as aoudad and feral hogs. There is only one record of a grizzly bear in Texas; it was killed in the Davis Range in 1890. Several private ranches in the Davis Mountains offer hunting opportunities.

== Climate ==
Nearly all of the Davis Mountains fall into the climate classification of BS (semiarid steppe) in the Köppen climate classification system. However, the highest elevations may transition into a cooler, wetter Cfb climate (subtropical humid with warm summers).

Climate data for Mount Locke, Texas, 1991–2020 normals, extremes 1935–present; elevation 6,790 ft (2,070 m)
Month	Jan	Feb	Mar	Apr	May	Jun	Jul	Aug	Sep	Oct	Nov	Dec	Year
Record high °F (°C)	80 (27)	88 (31)	94 (34)	94 (34)	96 (36)	104 (40)	104 (40)	104 (40)	96 (36)	94 (34)	83 (28)	80 (27)	104 (40)
Mean maximum °F (°C)	69.8 (21.0)	72.8 (22.7)	79.9 (26.6)	84.7 (29.3)	91.3 (32.9)	95.8 (35.4)	94.0 (34.4)	91.6 (33.1)	88.9 (31.6)	85.3 (29.6)	76.8 (24.9)	70.5 (21.4)	97.4 (36.3)
Mean daily maximum °F (°C)	55.1 (12.8)	59.2 (15.1)	66.2 (19.0)	73.2 (22.9)	80.9 (27.2)	86.8 (30.4)	85.0 (29.4)	83.8 (28.8)	79.0 (26.1)	73.5 (23.1)	63.5 (17.5)	55.8 (13.2)	71.8 (22.1)
Daily mean °F (°C)	43.7 (6.5)	47.0 (8.3)	52.8 (11.6)	59.3 (15.2)	67.1 (19.5)	73.1 (22.8)	72.3 (22.4)	71.6 (22.0)	67.0 (19.4)	61.0 (16.1)	51.4 (10.8)	44.6 (7.0)	59.2 (15.1)
Mean daily minimum °F (°C)	32.3 (0.2)	34.8 (1.6)	39.4 (4.1)	45.3 (7.4)	53.3 (11.8)	59.3 (15.2)	59.6 (15.3)	59.4 (15.2)	55.1 (12.8)	48.5 (9.2)	39.4 (4.1)	33.4 (0.8)	46.7 (8.1)
Mean minimum °F (°C)	15.7 (−9.1)	18.4 (−7.6)	21.2 (−6.0)	27.7 (−2.4)	38.3 (3.5)	49.2 (9.6)	53.5 (11.9)	53.9 (12.2)	43.6 (6.4)	29.6 (−1.3)	19.5 (−6.9)	14.5 (−9.7)	10.7 (−11.8)
Record low °F (°C)	−10 (−23)	−6 (−21)	4 (−16)	11 (−12)	24 (−4)	34 (1)	40 (4)	40 (4)	29 (−2)	14 (−10)	8 (−13)	−2 (−19)	−10 (−23)
Average precipitation inches (mm)	0.62 (16)	0.49 (12)	0.43 (11)	0.51 (13)	1.38 (35)	2.50 (64)	3.99 (101)	3.45 (88)	2.96 (75)	1.40 (36)	0.67 (17)	0.58 (15)	18.98 (483)
Average snowfall inches (cm)	1.8 (4.6)	1.0 (2.5)	0.1 (0.25)	0.0 (0.0)	0.0 (0.0)	0.0 (0.0)	0.0 (0.0)	0.0 (0.0)	0.0 (0.0)	0.1 (0.25)	0.4 (1.0)	2.8 (7.1)	6.2 (15.7)
Average precipitation days (≥ 0.01 in)	3.3	2.8	2.6	2.6	5.6	9.0	12.8	12.1	10.1	6.1	3.4	3.2	73.6
Average snowy days (≥ 0.1 in)	1.1	0.7	0.1	0.0	0.0	0.0	0.0	0.0	0.0	0.0	0.2	1.6	3.7
Source 1: NOAA
Source 2: National Weather Service

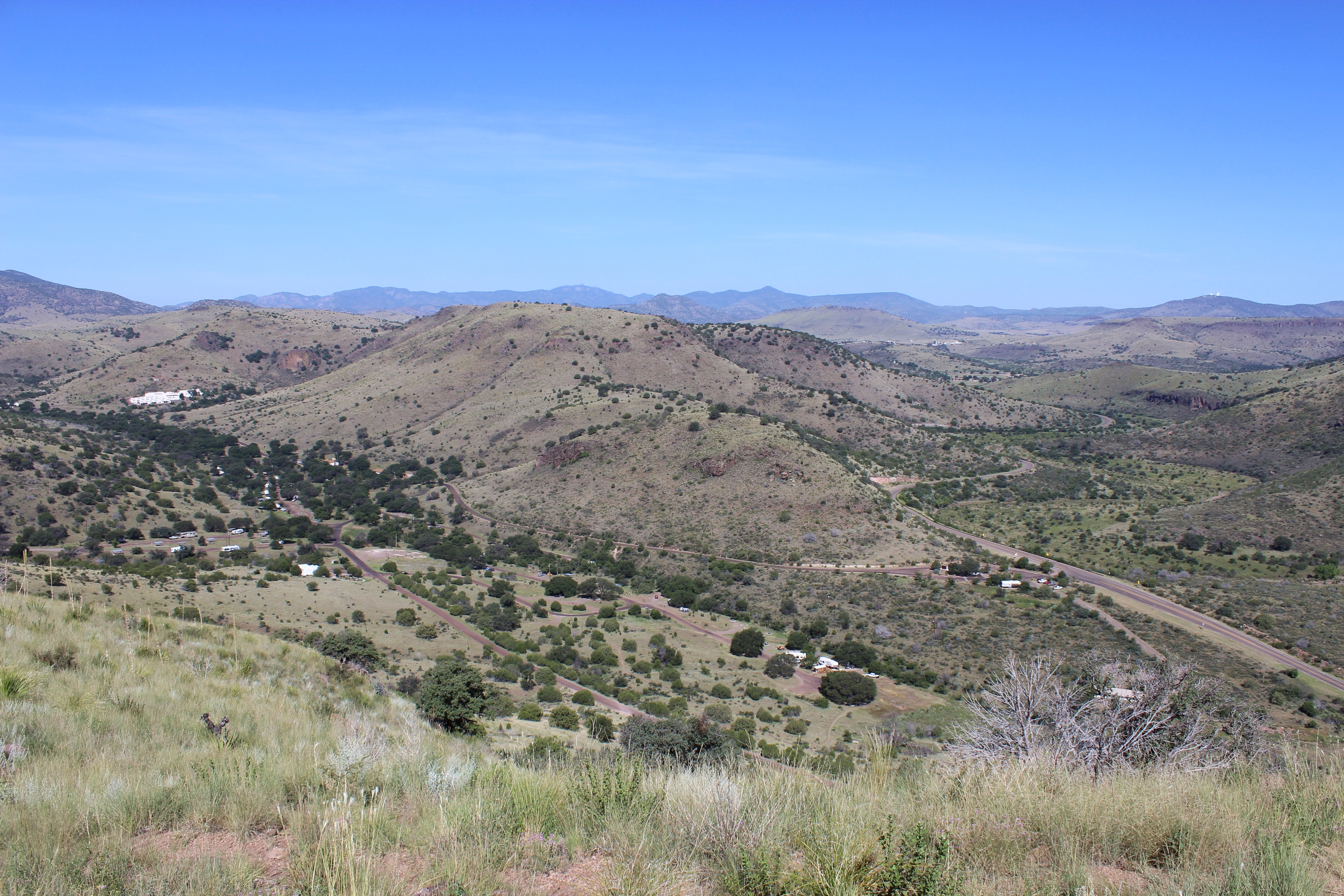
Davis Mountains State Park at the southern edge of the Davis Mountains: The elevation of the buildings is 1,550 m (5,090 ft).

== Conservation ==
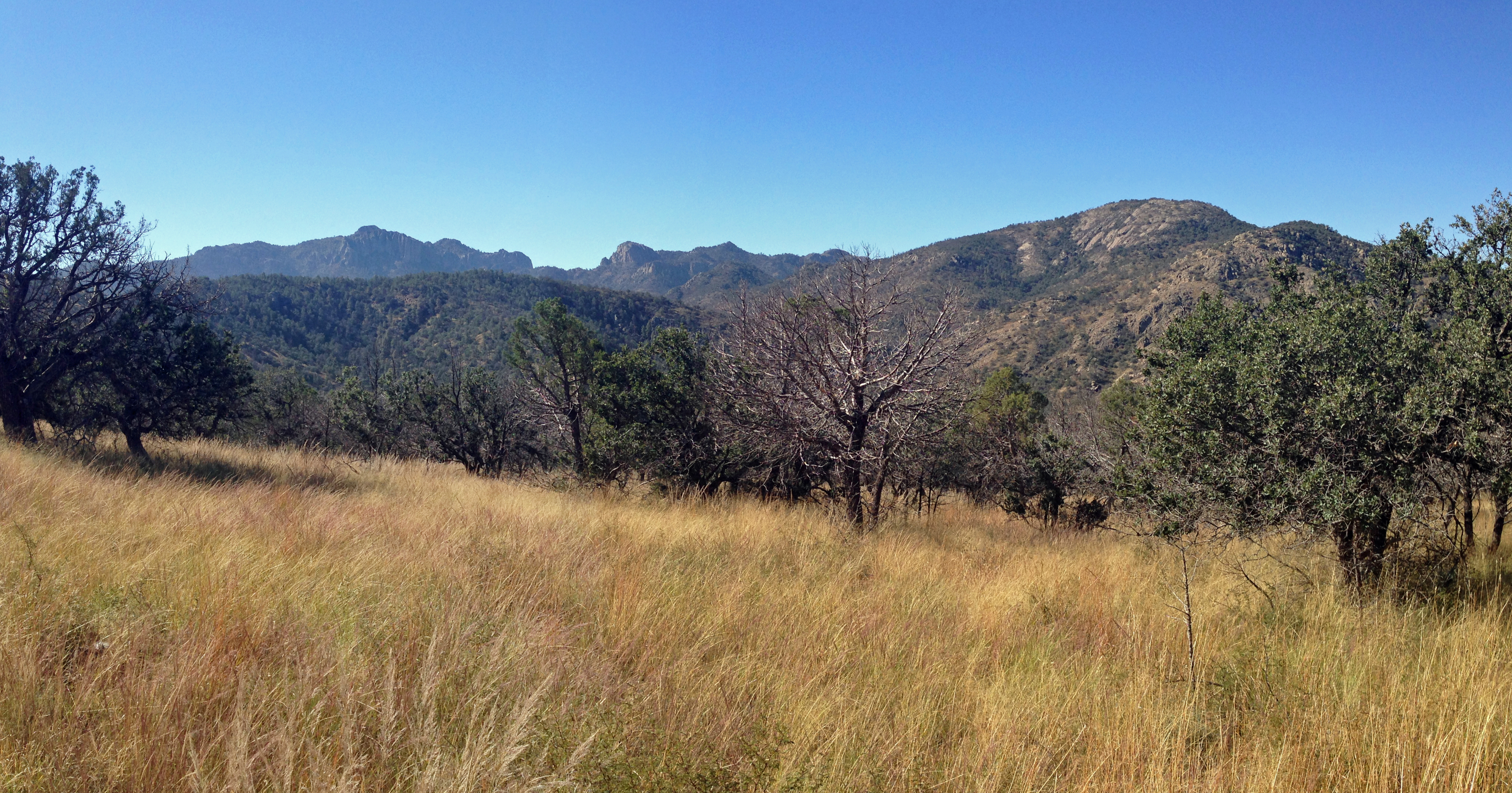
The Davis Mountains Preserve: Mount Livermore is left of center.

Most of the Davis Mountains are under private ownership. However, since 1996, the Nature Conservancy has acquired 33,000 acres (130 km^{2}) in the Davis Mountains range, along with conservation easements on 70,000 adjoining acres (280 km^{2}) of private ranchland. The Davis Mountain Preserve is open to the public at specified times.

== Facilities ==
McDonald Observatory is accessed by Spur 78 from State Highway 118. Spur 78 is the highest state maintained road in Texas at 6,791 feet near the summit of Mt. Locke where the older telescopes of the observatory are located. Spur 77 branches off from Spur 78, providing access to the newer research equipment atop Mt. Fowlkes.

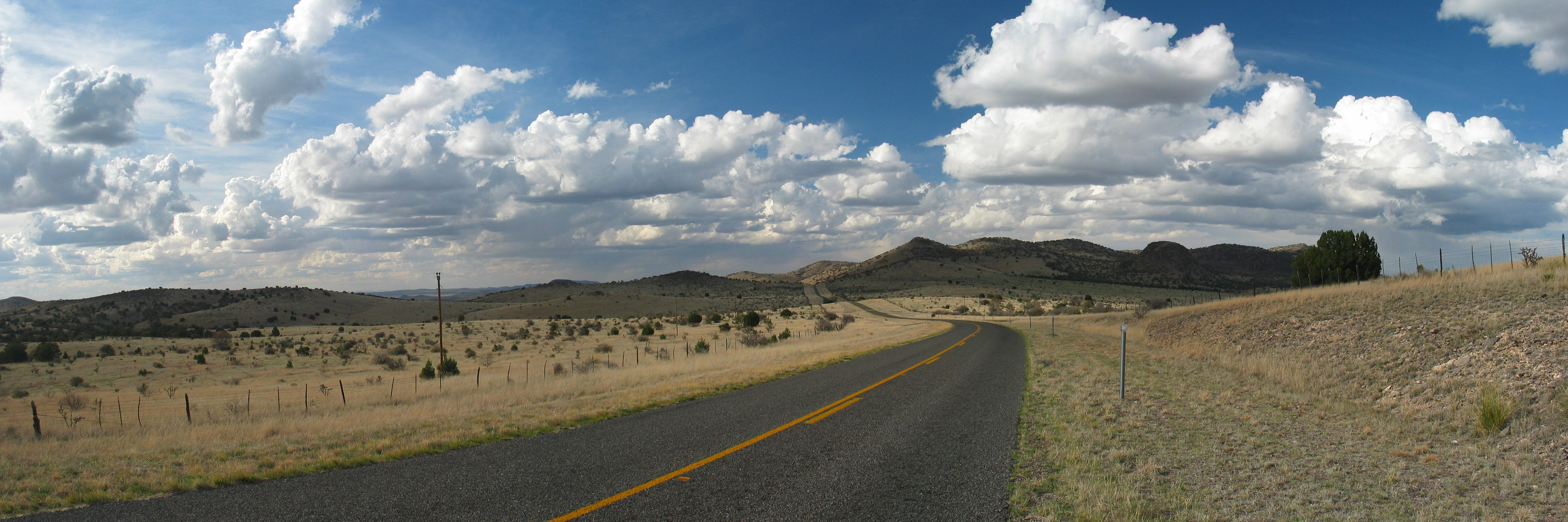
Rolling hills in the Davis Mountains

== Texas separatist standoff ==
The Texas separatist organization known as the Republic of Texas has its origins in the Davis Mountains. On April 27, 1997, the leader of the group, Rick McLaren, staged an attack on his neighbor's house and demanded that he cede his property to the Republic of Texas. This led to 300 state troopers surrounding his house with his five followers, his wife, the victims of the attack, and him inside for close to a week. Ultimately, one follower was shot in the standoff and McLaren was arrested and imprisoned for the equivalent of a life sentence.
