= KALP =

- Alpine, Texas; United States
- Frequency: 92.7 MHz
- Branding: Alpine's Country

Programming
- Format: Country music

Ownership
- Owner: Martin and Patricia Benevich; (Alpine Radio, LLC)
- Sister stations: KVLF

History
- First air date: March 26, 1992
- Call sign meaning: Alpine

Technical information
- Licensing authority: FCC
- Facility ID: 56480
- Class: A
- ERP: 2,350 watts
- HAAT: 100 meters (330 ft)
- Transmitter coordinates: 30°19′09″N 103°37′04″W

Links
- Public license information: Public file; LMS
- Website: bigbendradio.com

KALP (92.7 FM) is a country music-formatted radio station licensed to serve the Alpine, Texas, area. Broadcasting from studios located at Kokernot Field, the station is under ownership of Martin and Patricia Benevich, through licensee Alpine Radio, LLC.

The station is an affiliate of the Dallas Cowboys radio network.
