= KVLF (AM) =

Radio station in Alpine, Texas

Coordinates: 30°22′26.4″N 103°39′43.2″W

- Alpine, Texas; United States
- Broadcast area: Marathon, Texas; Fort Davis, Texas; Marfa, Texas
- Frequency: 1240 kHz
- Branding: 98.7 KVLF

Programming
- Format: Classic hits

Ownership
- Owner: Martin and Patricia Benevich; (Alpine Radio, LLC)
- Sister stations: KALP

History
- First air date: 1947
- Call sign meaning: Voice of the Last Frontier

Technical information
- Licensing authority: FCC
- Facility ID: 5216
- Class: C
- Power: 1,000 watts unlimited
- Translator: 98.7 K254CW (Alpine)

Links
- Public license information: Public file; LMS
- Webcast: Listen Live
- Website: www.bigbendradio.com

KVLF (1240 kHz) is an AM radio station in Alpine, Texas. It is owned by Alpine Radio, LLC.

== History ==
KVLF received its license in 1947. It was owned by Big Bend Broadcasting and broadcast on 1490 kHz until 1948. In 1958, Gene Hendryx bought KVLF from Jack W. Hawkins and Barney W. Hubbs; the station increased its daytime power to 1,000 watts in 1960 and its nighttime power to the same in 1997.

In 2015, Gene R. Hendryx Jr., sold KVLF to the Benevich family doing business as Alpine Radio, LLC.

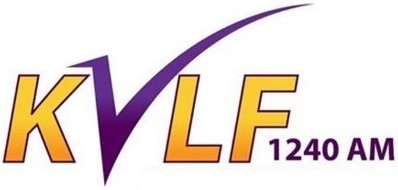
Logo before translator sign on
