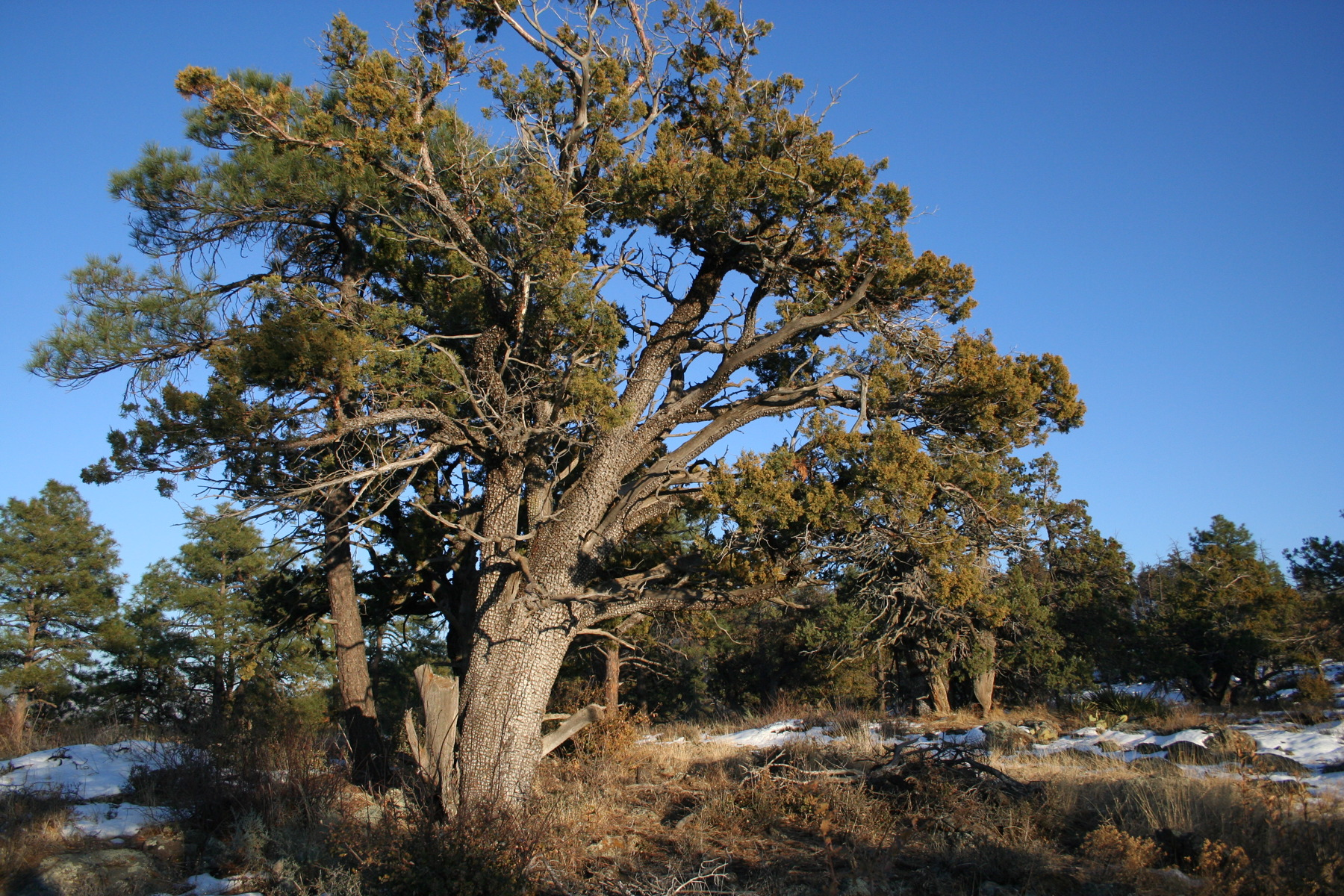
- Specimen in Gila County, Arizona

Conservation status
- Least Concern (IUCN 3.1)

Scientific classification
- Kingdom: Plantae
- Clade: Tracheophytes
- Clade: Gymnospermae
- Division: Pinophyta
- Class: Pinopsida
- Order: Cupressales
- Family: Cupressaceae
- Genus: Juniperus
- Species: J. deppeana

Binomial name
- Juniperus deppeana Steud.
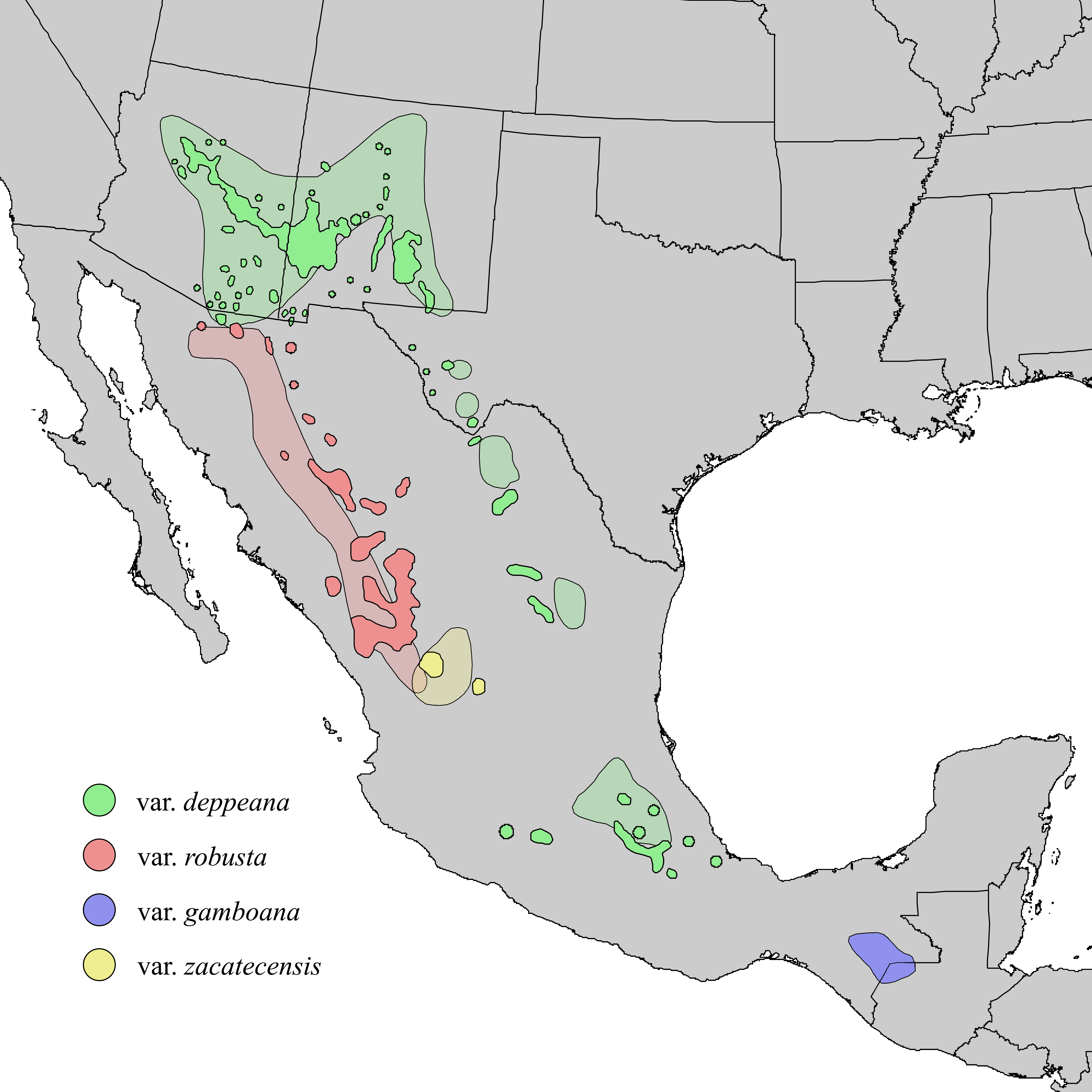
- Natural range

Synonyms
- Juniperus mexicana Schltdl. & Cham.; Sabina deppeana (Steud.) Y.Yang & K.S.Mao; Sabina mexicana Antoine

= Juniperus deppeana =

Species of conifer

Juniperus deppeana (alligator juniper or checkerbark juniper) is a small to medium-sized tree reaching 10–15 metres (33–49 feet) in height. It is native to central and northern Mexico and the southwestern United States.

== Description ==
The tree reaches 10–15 metres (33–49 feet), rarely 25 m (82 ft), in height. The bark is usually very distinctive, unlike other junipers, hard, dark gray-brown, cracked into small square plates superficially resembling alligator skin; it is however sometimes like other junipers, with stringy vertical fissuring. The shoots are 1–1.5 millimetres (1/32–1/16 inch) in diameter. On juvenile specimens, the leaves are needle-like and 5–10 mm (3/16–3/8 in) long. The leaves are arranged in opposite decussate pairs or whorls of three; in adulthood they are scale-like, 1–2.5 mm (1/16–1/8 in) long (up to 5 mm) and 1–1.5 mm broad. The cones are berrylike, 7–15 mm (1/4–9/16 in) wide, green when young and maturing to orange-brown with a whitish waxy bloom,. These contain 2–6 seeds, which mature in about 18 months. The male cones are 4–6 mm (3/16–1/4 in) long, and shed their pollen in spring. The species is largely dioecious, producing cones of only one sex on each tree, but occasional trees are monoecious.

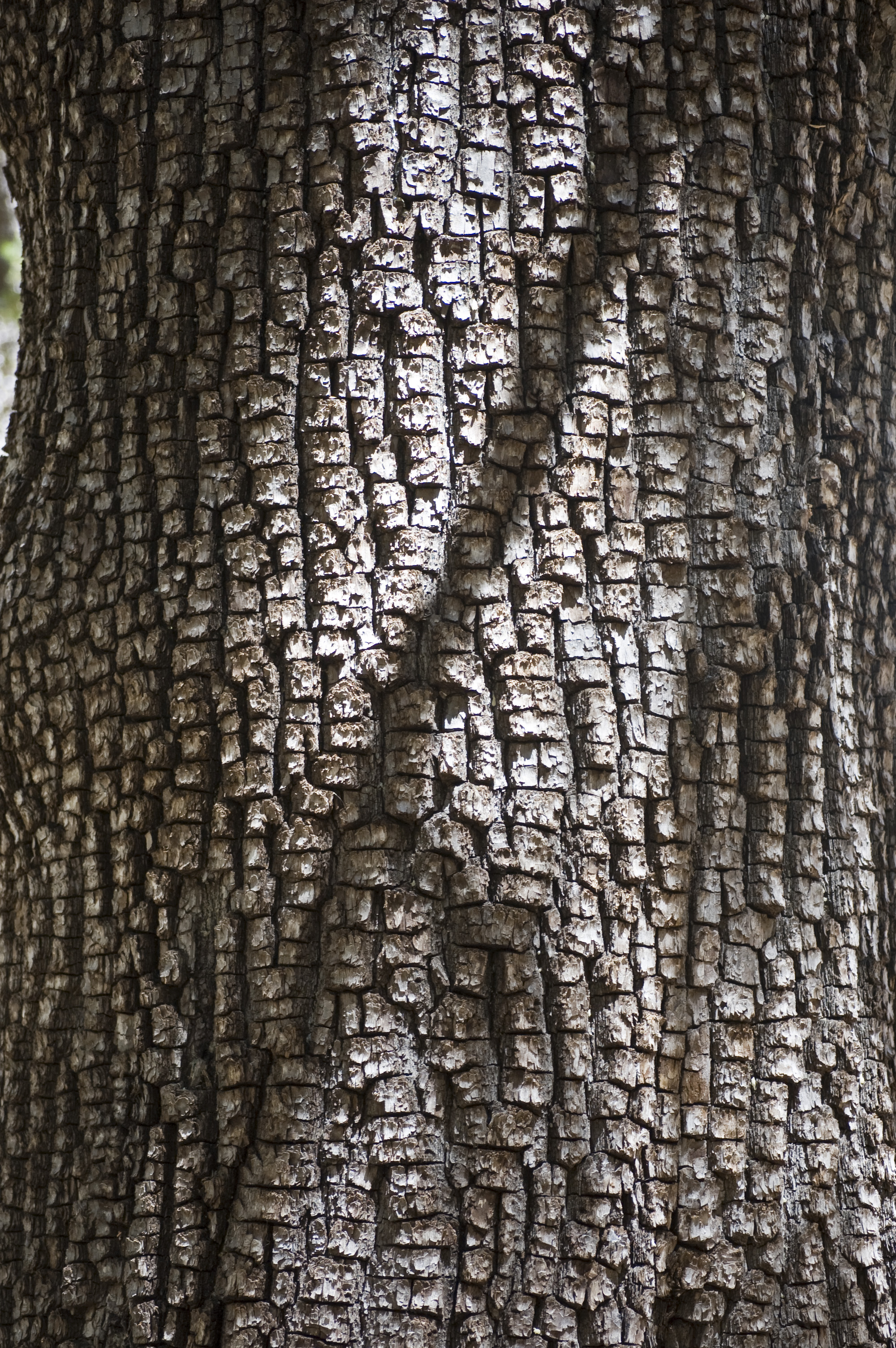
Alligator-like bark on trunk

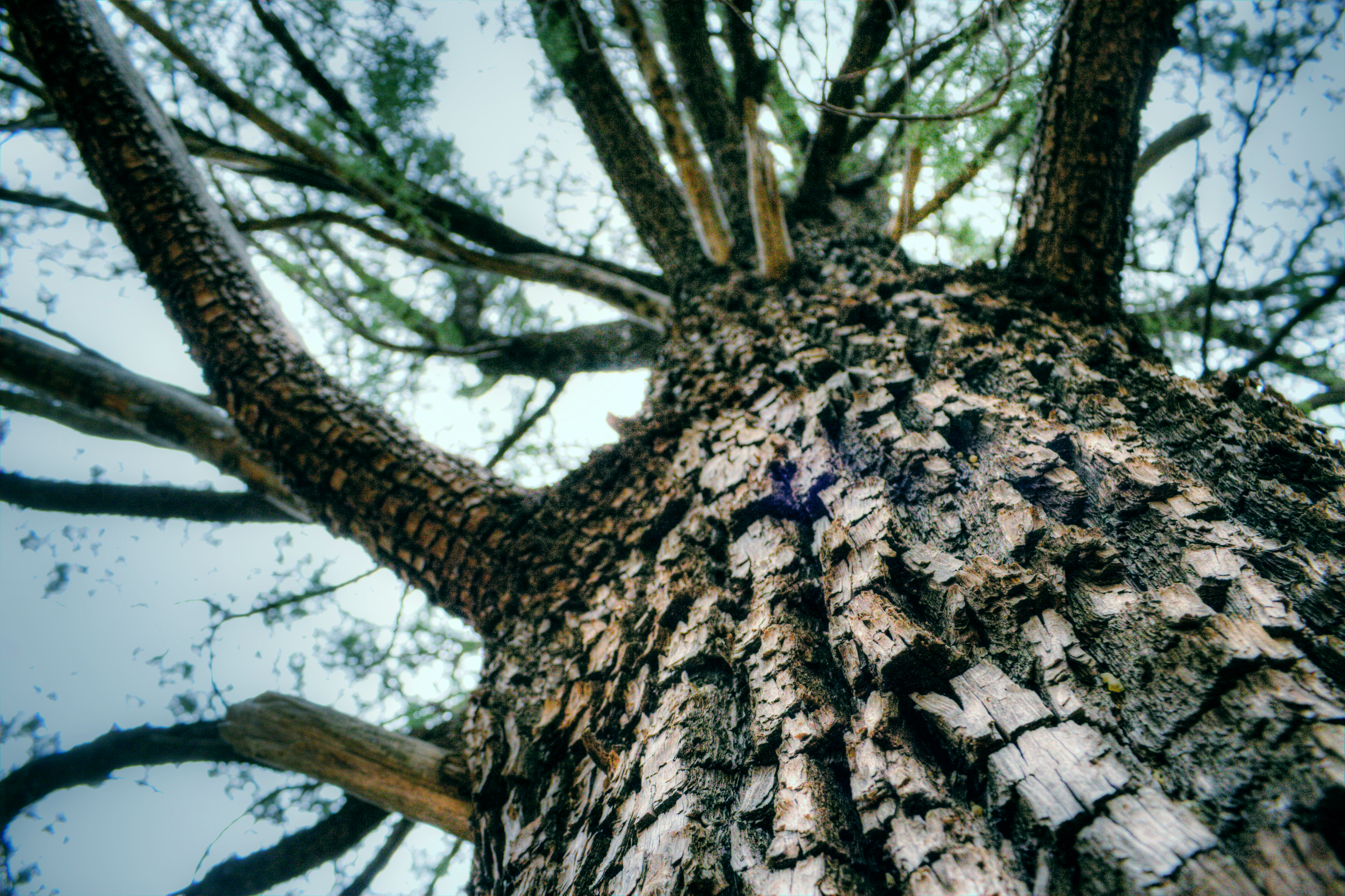
Alligator-like bark on some of the branches

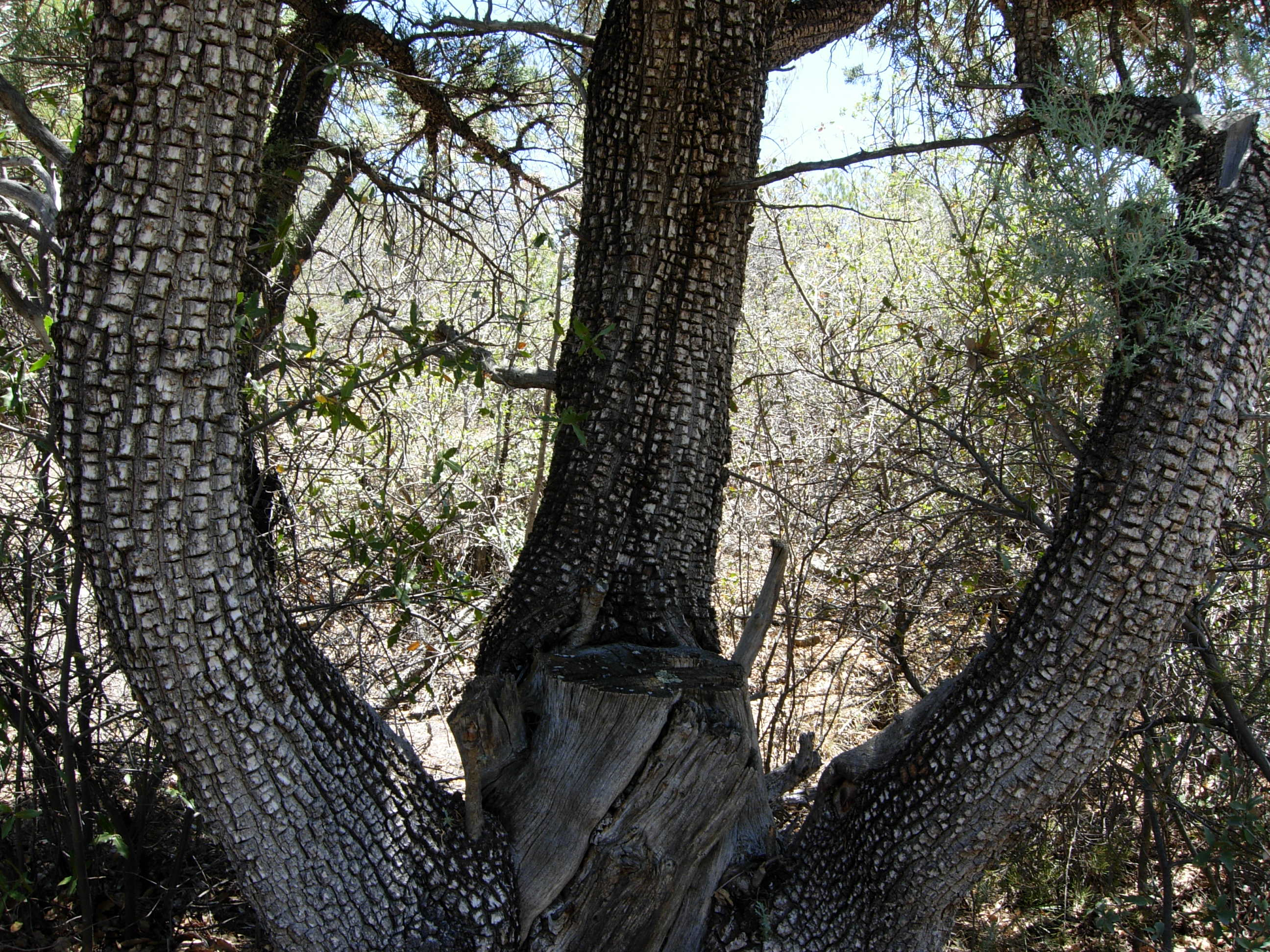
Split form of trunk

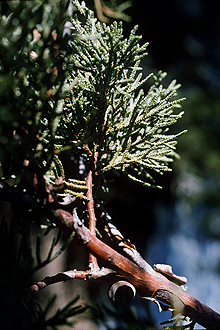
Foliage

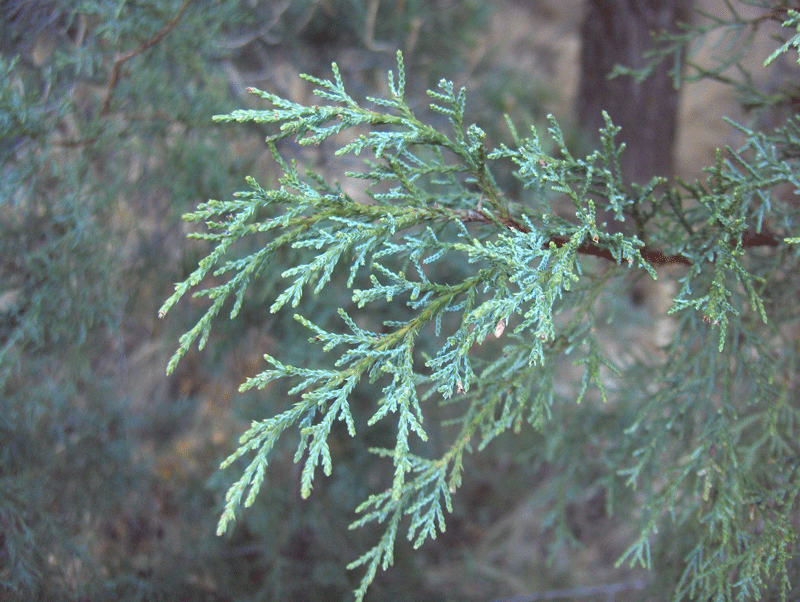
Close-up of leaves

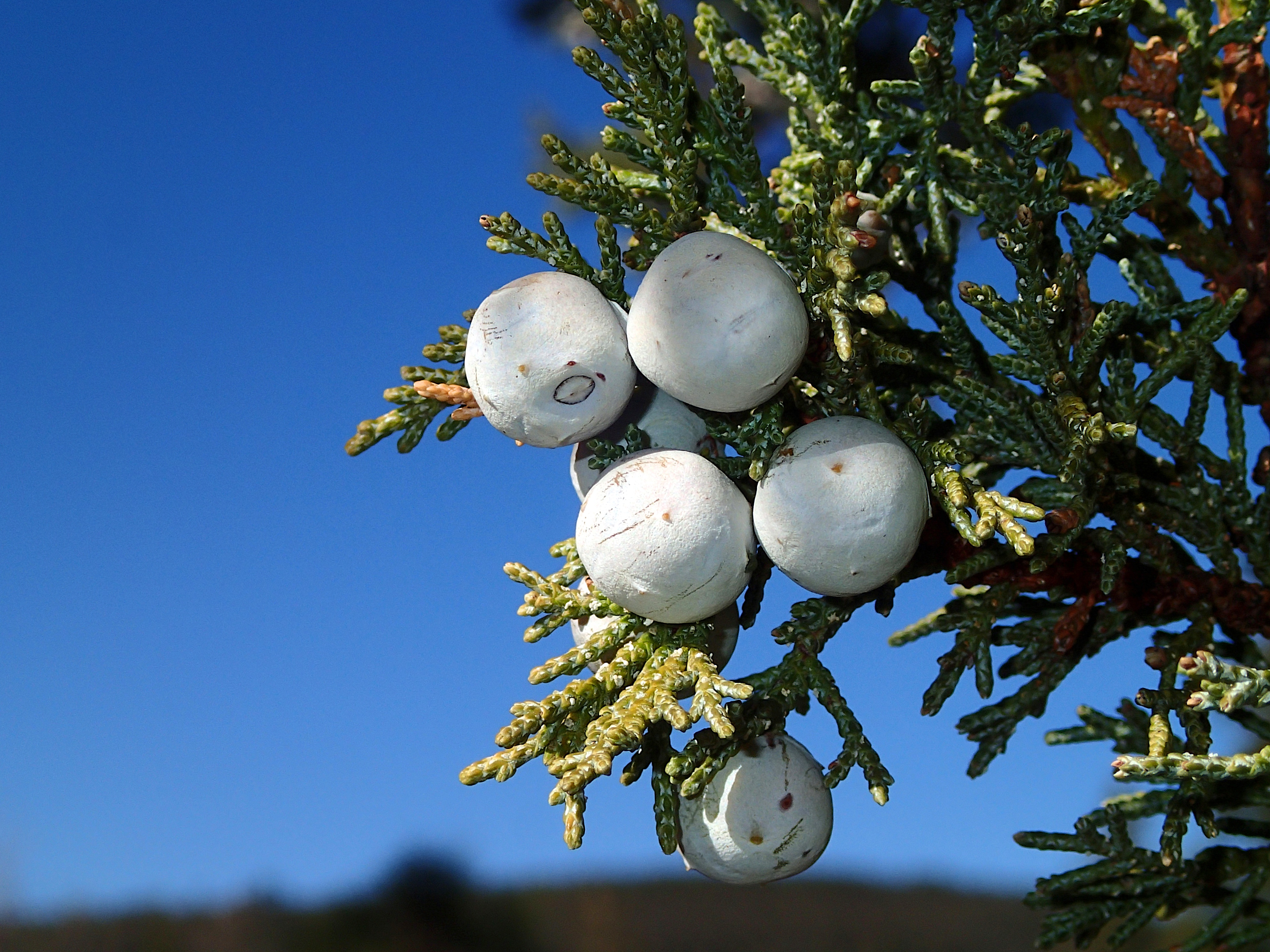
Close-up of juniper berries

== Taxonomy ==
There are five varieties, not accepted as distinct by all authorities:

- Juniperus deppeana var. deppeana. Throughout the range of the species. Foliage dull gray-green with a transparent or yellowish resin spot on each leaf; cones 7–12 mm (1/4–1/2 in) diameter.
- Juniperus deppeana var. pachyphlaea (syn. J. pachyphlaea). Arizona, New Mexico, northernmost Mexico. Foliage strongly glaucous with a white resin spot on each leaf; cones 7–12 mm diameter.
- Juniperus deppeana var. robusta (syn. J. deppeana var. patoniana). Northwestern Mexico. Cones larger, 10–15 mm (3/8–5/8 in) diameter.
- Juniperus deppeana var. sperryi. Western Texas, very rare. Bark furrowed, not square-cracked, branchlets pendulous; possibly a hybrid with J. flaccida.
- Juniperus deppeana var. zacatecensis. Zacatecas. Cones large, 10–15 mm diameter.

=== Etymology ===
Native American names include táscate and tláscal.

== Distribution and habitat ==
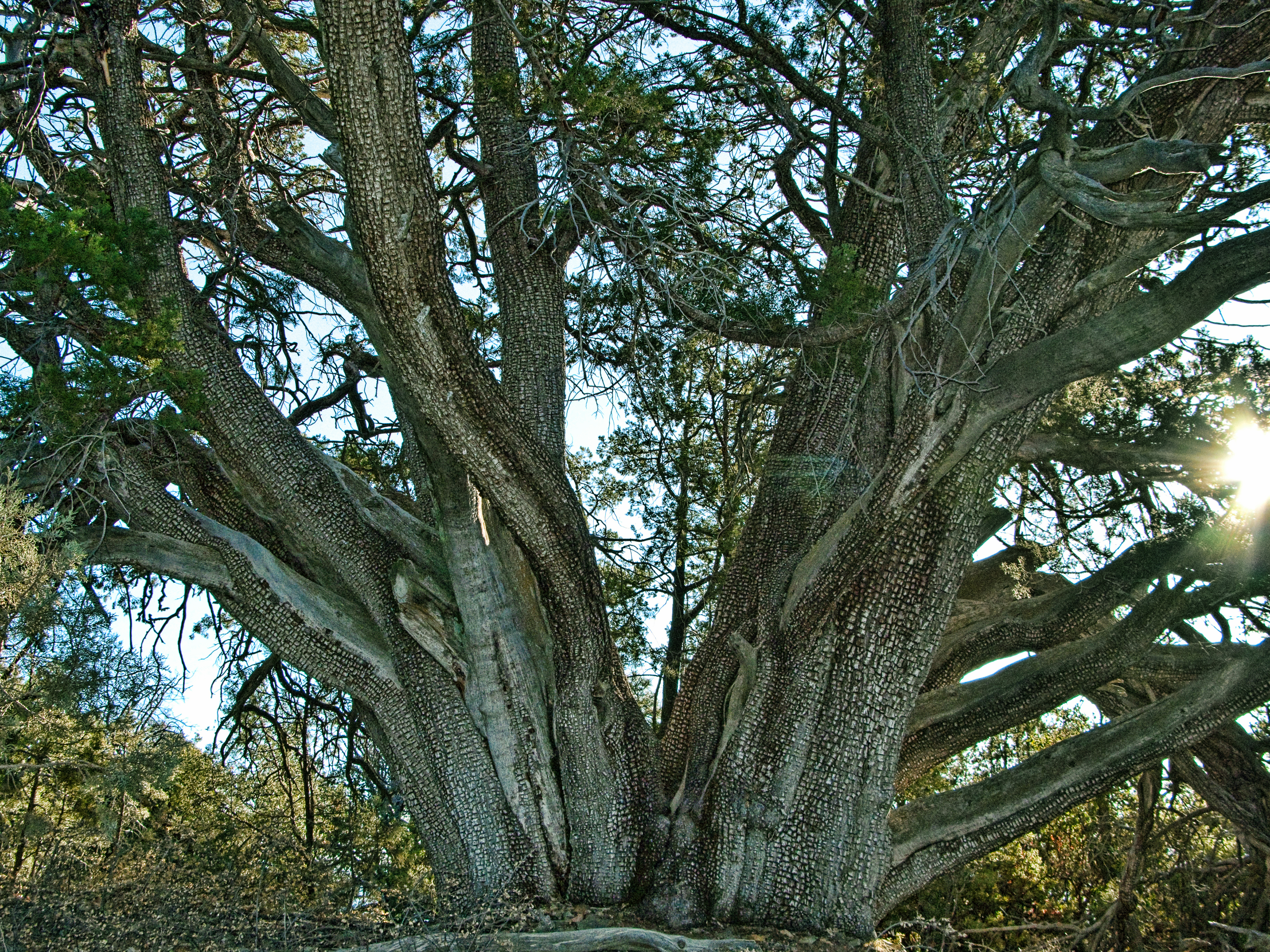
Vastly split trunk in Prescott, Arizona

It is native to central and northern Mexico (from Oaxaca northward) and the southwestern United States (Arizona, New Mexico, western Texas). It grows at moderate elevations of 750–2,700 m (2,460–8,860 ft) on dry soils.

== Ecology ==
The berrylike cones are eaten by birds and mammals.

== Uses ==
Berries from alligator juniper growing in the Davis Mountains of West Texas are used to flavor gin, including one produced by WildGins Co. in Austin, Texas.
