= Henry M. and Annie V. Trueheart House =

- U.S. National Register of Historic Places
- Recorded Texas Historic Landmark
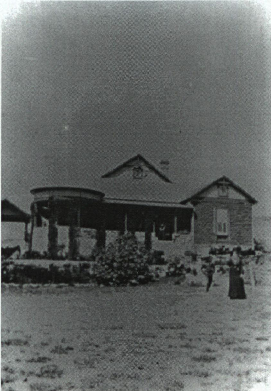
- Trueheart House c. 1910

- Location within Texas Location within the United States
- Location: 804 Court Ave., Fort Davis, Texas
- Coordinates: 30°35′20″N 103°54′8″W
- Area: 2 acres (0.81 ha)
- Built: 1898
- Architectural style: Queen Anne
- Website: Limpia Property Company
- NRHP reference No.: 96001014
- RTHL No.: 10488

Significant dates
- Added to NRHP: September 12, 1996
- Designated RTHL: 1964

The Henry M. and Annie V. Trueheart House is a residence of historic significance located in the town of Fort Davis, the seat and largest town of Jeff Davis County in the U.S. state of Texas. The house was built in 1898 and, along with the surrounding property, was added to the National Register of Historic Places (NRHP) in 1996. The Trueheart House has also been distinguished as a Recorded Texas Historic Landmark (RTHL) since 1964.

== Description ==
The Trueheart House and surrounding property occupy a one-block portion of the Paradise Valley Subdivision on the western edge of the town of Fort Davis located at 101 Madrone Street although officially at 804 Court Avenue with the county tax appraisal district even though the house faces eastward toward Madrone rather than northward toward Court. The property is bounded on the north by Court Ave., on the east by Madrone St. (formerly known as Seventh Street), and on the south by Woodward Avenue. No street separates the property from others to the west. Palisade cliffs of the Davis Mountains partially enclose the town to the north and west providing a backdrop setting for the property. An outcrop of large boulders extending northward from the north and northwest facings of the house provide a transition from the cliffs to an expansive view of a Chihuahuan Desert high-altitude plateau to the southeast. Court Avenue, running along the north side of the property, connects the property to the Grierson-Sproul House at the west end of the avenue and to the Jeff Davis County Courthouse at the east end, both of which are listed on the NRHP. Fort Davis National Historic Site is located nearby at the north end of town.

The central main house dominates the property and has a frontal facade facing eastward toward Madrone St. The house is adjacent to a large, rocky outcrop on the north, and along the western edge of the outcrop are located a windmill, a cistern and pump house, and a water storage tank. To the south of the main house runs an unpaved drive beginning at Madrone St. that passes through and around a porte-cochère physically separate from the house's south approach, and then veers southward to Woodward Ave. southwest of the house. An additional drive branches northward passing in front of the house's main entrance on the east and then doubles back to Madrone St. The main house with its porte-cochère along with the windmill, cistern and pump house, and tank are considered contributing resources to the property's NRHP designation.

Non-contributing buildings on the property include a guest house located west of the main house near the western property boundary and a garage near the southwest corner. Other non-contributing structures consist of a gazebo with accompanying piazza near a stone play house southwest of the main house, and stone retaining walls or fencing located within and around portions of the property. Other listed non-contributing objects include a flagpole in the yard in front of the main house and a former sign at the northeast corner of the property.

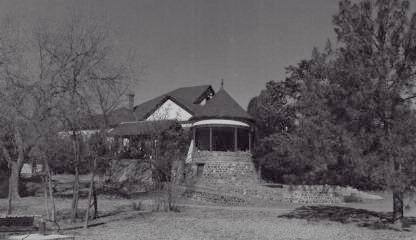

The Trueheart House is an approximately 2,600-square-foot (240 m^{2}) Queen Anne style residence sitting atop a foundation and support walls made of native stone with sand and lime mortar upholding 18-inch (46 cm) double-brick plastered adobe walls which hold deep openings for imported milled wood-frame doors, windows, and roofing. Two chimneys vent four fireplaces within the house. The eastward-facing frontal facade features a northeast bedroom extending outward from the rest of the home's interior. At the southeast corner of the home is a circular balcony above a round exterior turret. The balcony extends into a central veranda ending at the wall of the northeast bedroom, accessed by a stairway directly across from the main entrance to the house from a sidewalk across the front lawn accessed from an additional stairway leading from the street. Around the corner of from the veranda on the circular balcony, a stairway descends nearly 8 feet (2.4 m) to a stone patio between the house and the porte-cochère, which itself has steps leading to the drive. A series of planters behind a stone retaining wall extend from the porte-cochère to the southwest corner of the house. The veranda is elevated 6–8 feet (1.8–2.4 m) above the ground due to the slope of the surrounding property. The front roofing features a gable over the northeast bedroom, a larger gable over the veranda, and a conical, shingled "Chinese" cupola over the turret. The back of the house features a stone porch outside the kitchen with doorways to the kitchen and northwest bedroom as well as steps leading to ground level on the south beyond the boulder field. The landscaping, in addition to ambient wildflowers and cactus among the rocky outcrop, include elm, pine, and junipers in the front which largely obscure the frontal elevation, and a hackberry tree in the back. Shrubbery and ground cover have also been cultivated around the home.

At the main entrance are central double doors surrounded by a transom window and sidelights with doors and windows featuring leaded stained glass. Interior walls are composed of 14-inch (36 cm) plastered adobe. The entrance opens into a foyer effectively serving as a parlor with a fireplace in the northwest corner which shares a chimney with fireplaces in both of the northern bedrooms. The foyer has doorways leading to the northeast bedroom and the great room on the southeast side of the house and has a portal opposite the entrance leading to the dining room. The great room has a window overlooking the veranda and balcony to the east, and windows to the south with views that include the porte-cochère, stone patio, and toward the southwest of the property and beyond. The great room has additional doorways leading to the dining room and the southwest bedroom, and it has a fireplace that shares the same chimney as one in the southwest bedroom. The southwest bedroom has a south-facing window, a doorway to the kitchen, and a separate bathroom at the southwest corner of the house with closet space and windows facing south and west. The kitchen has a double doorway leading into the dining room and a door leading to the back porch on the room's southwest corner. The kitchen has bay windows overlooking the porch, a pantry closet in the room's southeastern corner, and features a late-19th to early 20th Century cast iron gas stove. The sink is in the northeast corner with food preparation counters extending from there around the room's northwestern corner. The dining room, in addition to the above-mentioned portals, also has a doorway leading to the central bedroom on the house's north side and a portal into a hallway leading to a common bathroom and the northwestern bedroom. The northwest bedroom, accessed by the hallway from the interior of the house, also has a doorway leading to the back stone porch adjacent to the kitchen. This bedroom has windows facing north and west overlooking the boulder field. The northwest bedroom shares a common bathroom off the hallway that has a north-facing window. The northeast bedroom has windows facing the north and east, but is walled-off from the adjoining veranda. The flanking rooms hold 11-foot (3.4 m) ceilings, and some of the rooms on the north side still retain their original wood beaded-ceiling planks. Between the two north bedrooms are bathrooms for each as well as closets. Both north bedrooms also have private living room space.

On the eastern end of the house's south facing is a tall unattached porte-cochère with elaborate stone paving and a landscaped landing at ground level. On the west end of the porte-cochère, steps lead from ground level to an adjacent stone patio, while further steps ascend to the southeastern balcony and front entrance from the veranda. The porte-cochère retains original iron rings for tying carriage horses. A doorway from the stone patio leads to a basement underneath the house's great room with an adjacent basement-level workshop through an additional door underneath the southeast balcony and southern portion of the veranda.

In addition to the main house and porte-cochère, other contributing structures to the site's NRHP designation include the water-pumping and storage infrastructure on the west side of the boulder field dominating the home's northern exterior. These include an Aermotor windmill along with a stone pump house and cistern that originally served the house and gardens. A nearby large, square water storage tank constructed of stone integrates well into the adjacent boulder formation.

The property's non-contributing features include the guest house, approximately 50 feet (15 m) west of the main house. This adobe structure includes a living room with a fireplace, kitchen, a full bath, and laundry space. The exterior of the guest home holds two shaded patios. At the southwest corner of the property along the Woodward Ave. entrance and south of the guest house is a garage. A piazza constructed of native stone lies 20 feet (6.1 m) south of the main house and is adjacent to a wooden gazebo which together are shaded by a large hackberry tree as well as other smaller trees and vines. To the northwest of the piazza/gazebo combination is a small, round playhouse constructed of stone with a wooden roof. Native stone and mortar retaining walls as well as walls and fencing enclose the property and separate different portions of the lawn and gardens within the property. A flag pole is located in the front yard of the main house while a sign, dating to the house's previous function as a museum, is also listed as a non-contributing structure although it has since been removed.

== See also ==
- National Register of Historic Places listings in Jeff Davis County, Texas
- Recorded Texas Historic Landmarks in Jeff Davis County
