= National Register of Historic Places listings in Jeff Davis County, Texas =

Location of Jeff Davis County in Texas

This is a list of the National Register of Historic Places listings in Jeff Davis County, Texas.

This is intended to be a complete list of properties and districts listed on the National Register of Historic Places in Jeff Davis County, Texas. There are six properties listed on the National Register in the county including one site listed as both a National Historic Site and a National Historic Landmark. Three sites are also listed as Recorded Texas Historic Landmarks including one that is a State Antiquities Landmark.

This National Park Service list is complete through NPS recent listings posted March 21, 2025.

== Current listings ==
The publicly disclosed locations of National Register properties and districts may be seen in a mapping service provided.

	Name on the Register	Image	Date listed	Location	City or town	Description
1	Fort Davis National Historic Site	Fort Davis National Historic Site	October 15, 1966 (#66000045)	Junction of State Highways 17 and 118; 30°35′55″N 103°53′40″W	Fort Davis	National Historic Landmark; frontier Army fort established in 1854
2	Grierson-Sproul House	Grierson-Sproul House	August 11, 1982 (#82004508)	Court Ave. 30°35′26″N 103°54′17″W	Fort Davis	Recorded Texas Historic Landmark
3	Hotel Limpia	Hotel Limpia	March 3, 2025 (#100011474)	101 Memorial Square; 30°35′21″N 103°53′39″W	Fort Davis	
4	Jeff Davis County Courthouse	Jeff Davis County Courthouse	July 11, 2002 (#02000728)	Bounded by Court St., Front St., Woodward Ave., and State St. (SH 17 / SH 118); 30°35′18″N 103°53′42″W	Fort Davis	Recorded Texas Historic Landmark; State Antiquities Landmark; erected 1910-1911
5	Phantom Lake Spring Site		May 10, 1995 (#95000501)	Address restricted	Toyahvale	
6	Henry M. and Annie V. Trueheart House	Henry M. and Annie V. Trueheart House	September 12, 1996 (#96001014)	Madrone St. between Court Ave. and Woodward Ave. 30°35′20″N 103°54′08″W	Fort Davis	Recorded Texas Historic Landmark

== See also ==
- National Register of Historic Places listings in Texas
- Recorded Texas Historic Landmarks in Jeff Davis County
