= Henderson County Courthouse =

Henderson County Courthouse can refer to:

- Henderson County Courthouse (North Carolina), Hendersonville, North Carolina
- Henderson County Courthouse (Texas), Athens, Texas
