= Day After Reading =

- Artist: Ludovic Balland
- Medium: Interview
- Subject: News consumption
- Website: https://dar-news.com

Day After Reading is an artistic & editorial documentary project started by Swiss graphic artist Ludovic Balland in San Francisco in 2014. For the project, Balland interviews people about their consumption of the news. Essentially starting with "What did you read in the news yesterday?" the interviews consist of a set of standard questions, and others as interviewee availability permits. Common questions are about one's first memory of the news, how one gets their news currently, what the subject thinks the news will be like in the future, and whether they dream about the news.

Interviews are recorded and transcribed to the Day After Reading website, along with photograph portraits of the interviewees. Balland, a typographer and designer of books about Architecture and Design, has a devotion to print media and prints Broadsheet newspapers of the interviews as resources allow. Ultimately, Balland plans to publish a compilation book of the third edition of the project and hopes to exhibit the project in art settings. Other participants on the project included Dasha Lisitsina, the journalist for the first leg of the "across the USA" edition; Anna Levy, journalist for the second half; and Jenn Virskus, copy editor for the first edition in San Francisco, CA.

== Editions ==
=== Issue N°1 ===
Took place in San Francisco, California, USA, from January 13–19, 2014. Originally invited to participate in an exhibition called All Possible Futures by curator Jon Sueda at [[Somarts]] art gallery, to feature artwork that was unfinished, Balland agreed to participate but declined to send in unfinished work. Instead, he conceived of "Day After Reading" as a way to look at the future through the past, i.e. the news.

=== Issue N°2 ===
Took place in Valencia, Santa Clarita, California, USA in 2015 as the primary objective of a week-long workshop Balland was invited to give for Graphic design MFA students of California Institute of the Arts (CalArts), with a school-published Newspaper as the end result.

=== Issue N°3 ===
A road trip around the USA that began on September 5, 2016 in New York City and is slated to wrap up on December 20, 2016 in Seattle, Washington.

==== Cities visited ====
The trip visited a number of cities and neighborhoods, including:

- Brooklyn neighborhood of New York City, NY
- Philadelphia, PA
- Detroit, MI
- Chicago, IL
- Nashville and Memphis, TN
- St. Louis, MO
- Dallas, TX
- Marfa, TX & Fort Davis, TX
