= Fort Davis Junior-Senior High School =

Location
- 400 Webster Ave; Fort Davis, Texas 79734-1339; United States
- Coordinates: 30°35′14″N 103°53′55″W

Information
- School type: Public high school
- School district: Fort Davis Independent School District
- Principal: Selena Martin
- Grades: 6-12
- Enrollment: 263 (2023-2024)
- Colors: Green and gold
- Athletics conference: UIL Class A
- Mascot: Indian
- Yearbook: The Indian
- Website: Fort Davis High School website

Fort Davis Junior-Senior High School is a public high school located in the unincorporated community of Fort Davis, in central Jeff Davis County, Texas, United States. The school is operated by the Fort Davis Independent School District and classified as a 1A school by the UIL. In 2013, the school was rated "Improvement Required" by the Texas Education Agency.

== Segregated schools ==
Fort Davis, like other Texas communities, formerly had racially segregated schools, with the "White" school on the site of the present-day Fort Davis High School. The "Mexican school" was located at the current site of Dirks-Anderson Elementary School in Fort Davis.

== Athletics ==
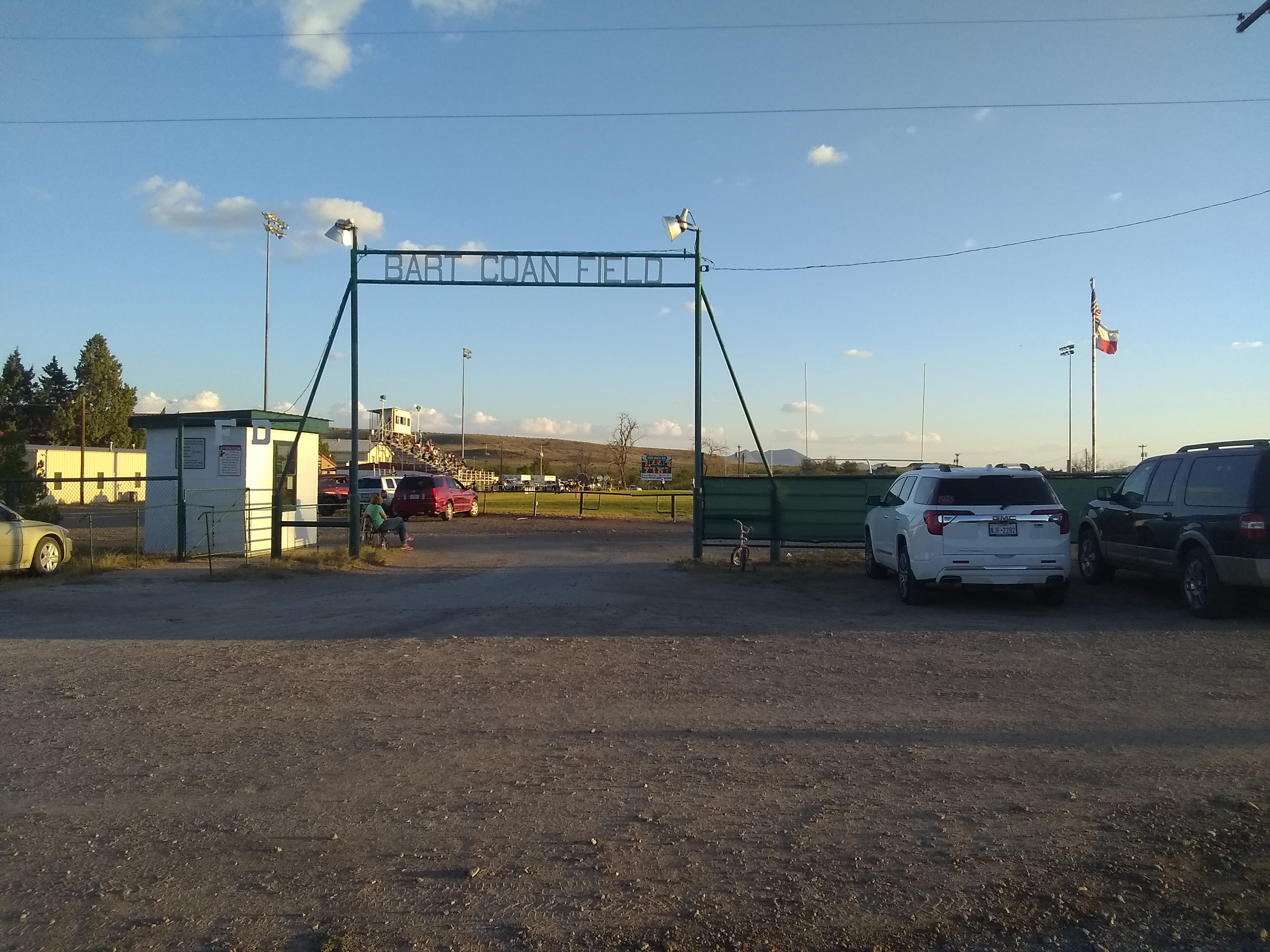
Entrance to Bart Coan Field

The Fort Davis Indians compete in the following sports

Cross Country, Volleyball, 6-Man Football, Basketball, Golf, Tennis, Track & Baseball

=== State titles ===
- Volleyball
  - 1980(1A)
