= Grierson-Sproul House =

- U.S. National Register of Historic Places
- Recorded Texas Historic Landmark
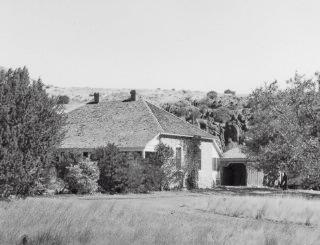

- Location within Texas Location within the United States
- Location: 901 Court Ave., Fort Davis, Texas
- Coordinates: 30°35′26″N 103°54′17″W
- Area: 3.9 acres (1.6 ha)
- Built: 1908
- Architectural style: Bungalow/craftsman
- Website: The Grierson House
- NRHP reference No.: 82004508
- RTHL No.: 18381

Significant dates
- Added to NRHP: August 11, 1982
- Designated RTHL: 2016

The Grierson-Sproul House, on Court Ave. in Fort Davis in Jeff Davis County, Texas, was built in 1908. Also known simply as Sproul House, it was listed on the National Register of Historic Places in 1982. The listing included two contributing buildings and a contributing structure.

It is a one-story L-shaped house which was built in 1908, but extensively remodeled in 1914 after a fire in 1912 caused extensive damage. It is a stone masonry vernacular residence which was once a hub of social activity in Fort Davis.

There is a one-story board-and-batten garage and a water tower, which are original and escaped fire damage.

== See also ==
- National Register of Historic Places listings in Jeff Davis County, Texas
- Recorded Texas Historic Landmarks in Jeff Davis County
