= Fort Davis Independent School District =

School district in Texas

Location
- Fort Davis, Texas 18 USA

District information
- Type: Public
- Grades: Pre-K through 12
- Superintendent: Graydon Hicks
- Schools: 3
- Budget: $5,005,607

Students and staff
- Students: 329 (in 2009)
- Teachers: 45.9 (2008–2009)
- Staff: 32.6 (2008–2009)
- Student–teacher ratio: 7.5 (2008–2009)
- District mascot: Indians
- Colors: Green & gold

Other information
- Website: http://www.fdisd.com/

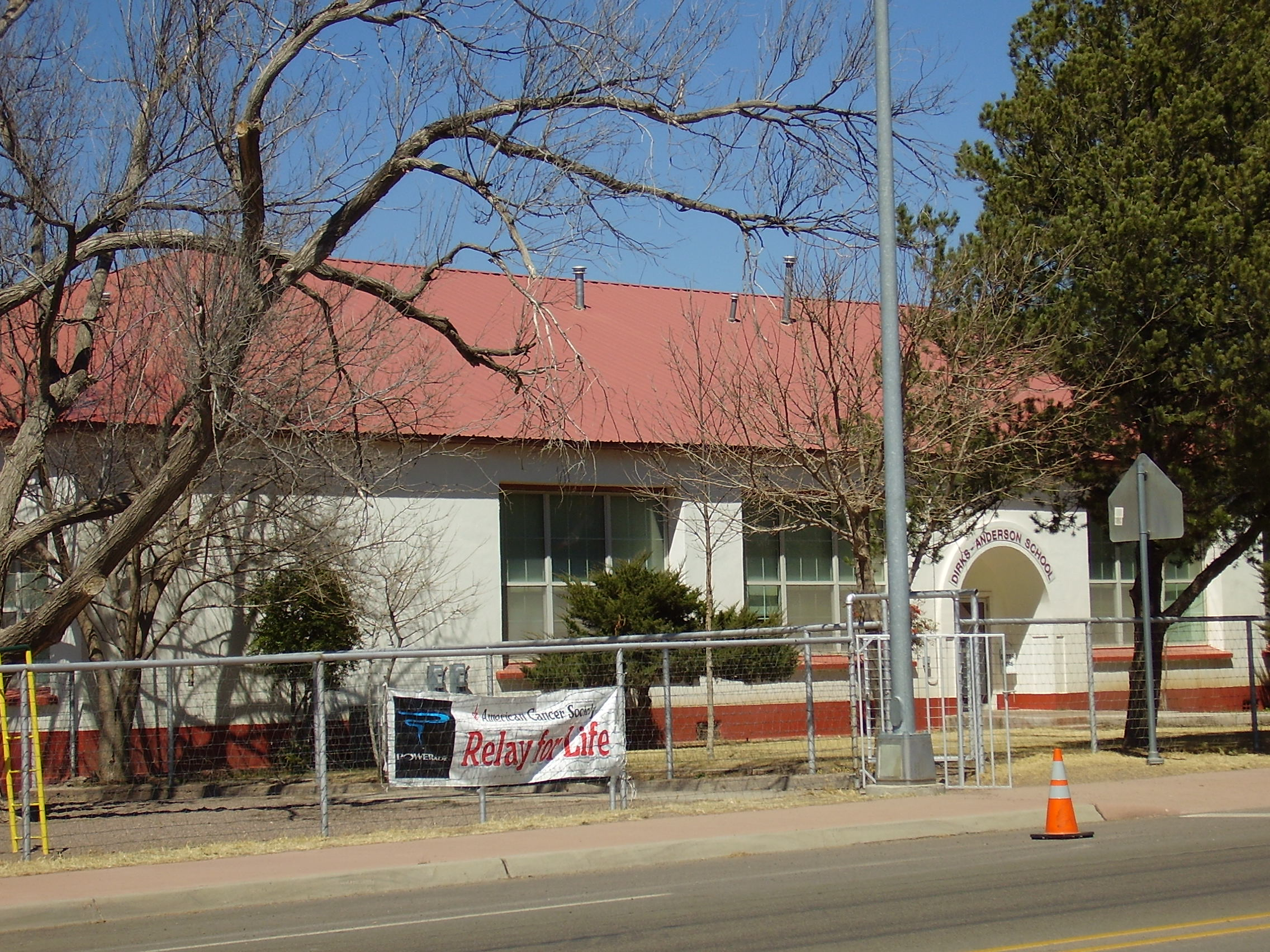
Dirks-Anderson Elementary School

Fort Davis Independent School District (FDISD) is a public school district based in the community of Fort Davis in unincorporated Jeff Davis County, Texas (USA).

It covers eastern parts of the county.

In 2009, the school district was rated "academically acceptable" by the Texas Education Agency.

== History ==
Fort Davis, like other Texas communities, formerly had racially segregated schools, with the "American" (for non-Hispanic white children) school on the site of the present-day Fort Davis High School. The "Mexican school" was located at the current site of Dirks-Anderson Elementary School in Fort Davis.

Forrest Wilder of Texas Monthly stated that from about 2013-23, the district's financial situation declined due to increased money the district has to spend due to rules from the state government and inflation, as well as declining money coming into the district.

In 2023, the district had 184 students.

== Operations and budgeting ==
From circa 2016-23, the district received annually about $2,500,000 through taxation, and it budgeted annually about $3,100,000.

== Campuses ==
As of 2023 the district has no cafeterias on any property. As of 2003, the area churches provided free lunches once per week, with secondary students getting one every Tuesday and elementary students getting one every Thursday.

As of 2023 the district does not have a running track. Fort Davis Independent School District recently celebrated a significant achievement in the UIL competition. The district's students from both elementary and junior high levels excelled, sweeping the competition with impressive results. In the elementary division, Fort Davis secured first place with a total of 711.5 points, followed by Van Horn and Balmorhea. Similarly, in the junior high division, Fort Davis also emerged first with 678 points, outperforming Balmorhea and Van Horn. The overall score for Fort Davis stood at a remarkable 1389.5 points, showcasing the students' and staff's dedication and hard work.

== Schools ==
- Fort Davis High School (Grades 6-12)
- Dirks-Anderson Elementary (Grades PK-5)
- High Frontier School (Serves the students enrolled in the High Frontier Treatment Center)
