= Henderson County Courthouse (Texas) =

Historic courthouse in Athens, Henderson County, Texas

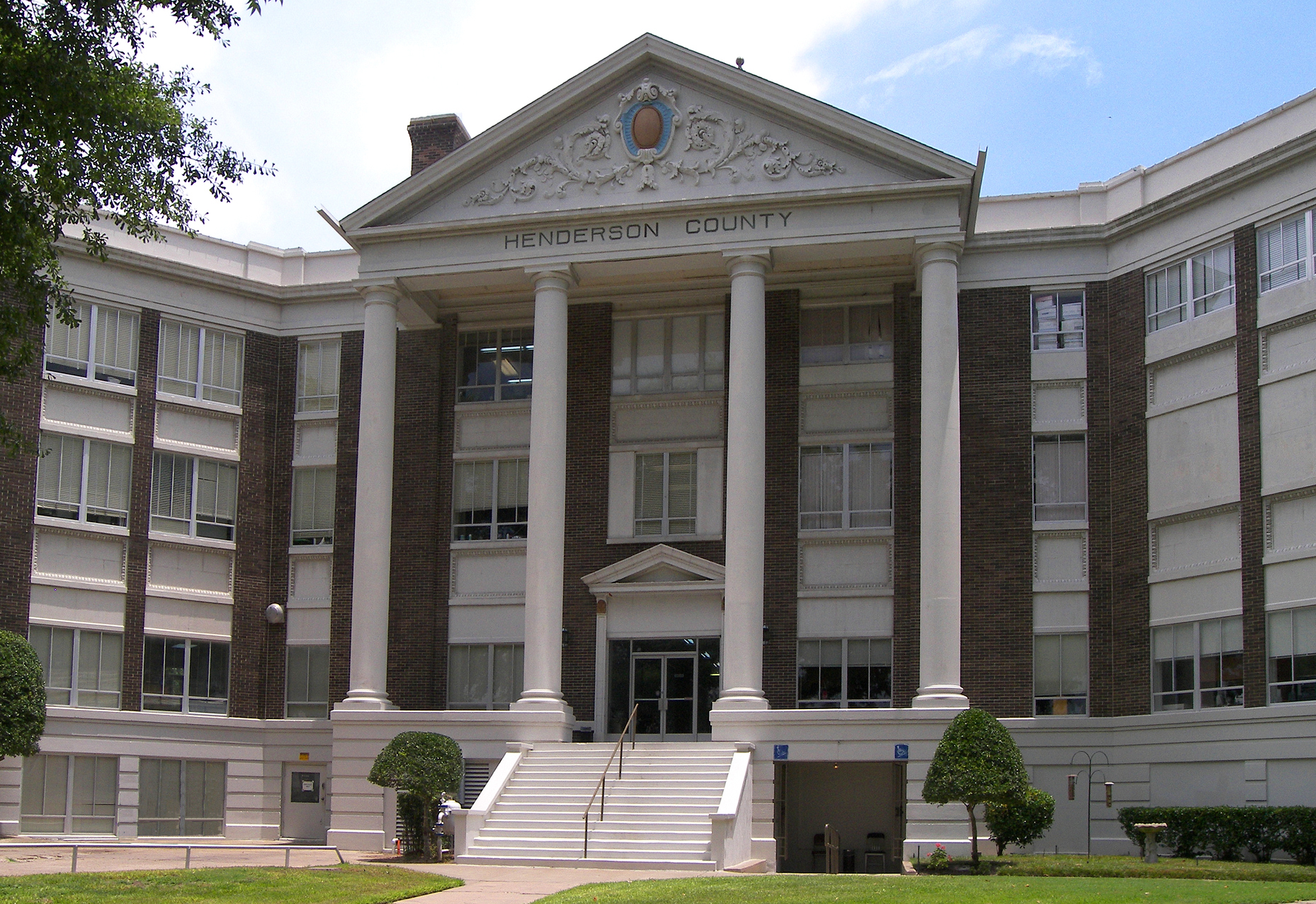
- Henderson County Courthouse
- Interactive map of the Henderson County Courthouse area

General information
- Architectural style: Classical Revival
- Location: 100 E Tyler St., Athens, Texas, United States
- Coordinates: 32.20487°N 95.8544°W
- Completed: 1913
- Cost: $170,000
- Client: Henderson County

Design and construction
- Architect: L. L. Thurman
- Engineer: Builder: L R. Wright

Recorded Texas Historic Landmark
- Official name: Henderson County Courthouse
- Designated: 2002
- Reference no.: 13831

The Henderson County Courthouse, built in 1913, is an historic 3-story redbrick Classical Revival style courthouse building with full basement located at 100 East Tyler Street in Athens, Texas. The courthouse has been designated as a Recorded Texas Historic Landmark since 2002. Designed by L. L. Thurman, who also previously designed the Jeff Davis County Courthouse in Fort Davis, it is unusual for its angled wings. It also has a central cupola which is not seen in most images, but there is no rotunda under the cupola. It is Henderson County's fourth courthouse and the second in Athens. The first one was built in 1850 in Buffalo, now a ghost town, and the second was built in 1861 in Centerville, which is also a ghost town today. The third courthouse was built in Athens in 1887.

== See also ==
- List of county courthouses in Texas
