= Jeff Davis County Courthouse (Texas) =

- U.S. National Register of Historic Places
- Texas State Antiquities Landmark
- Recorded Texas Historic Landmark
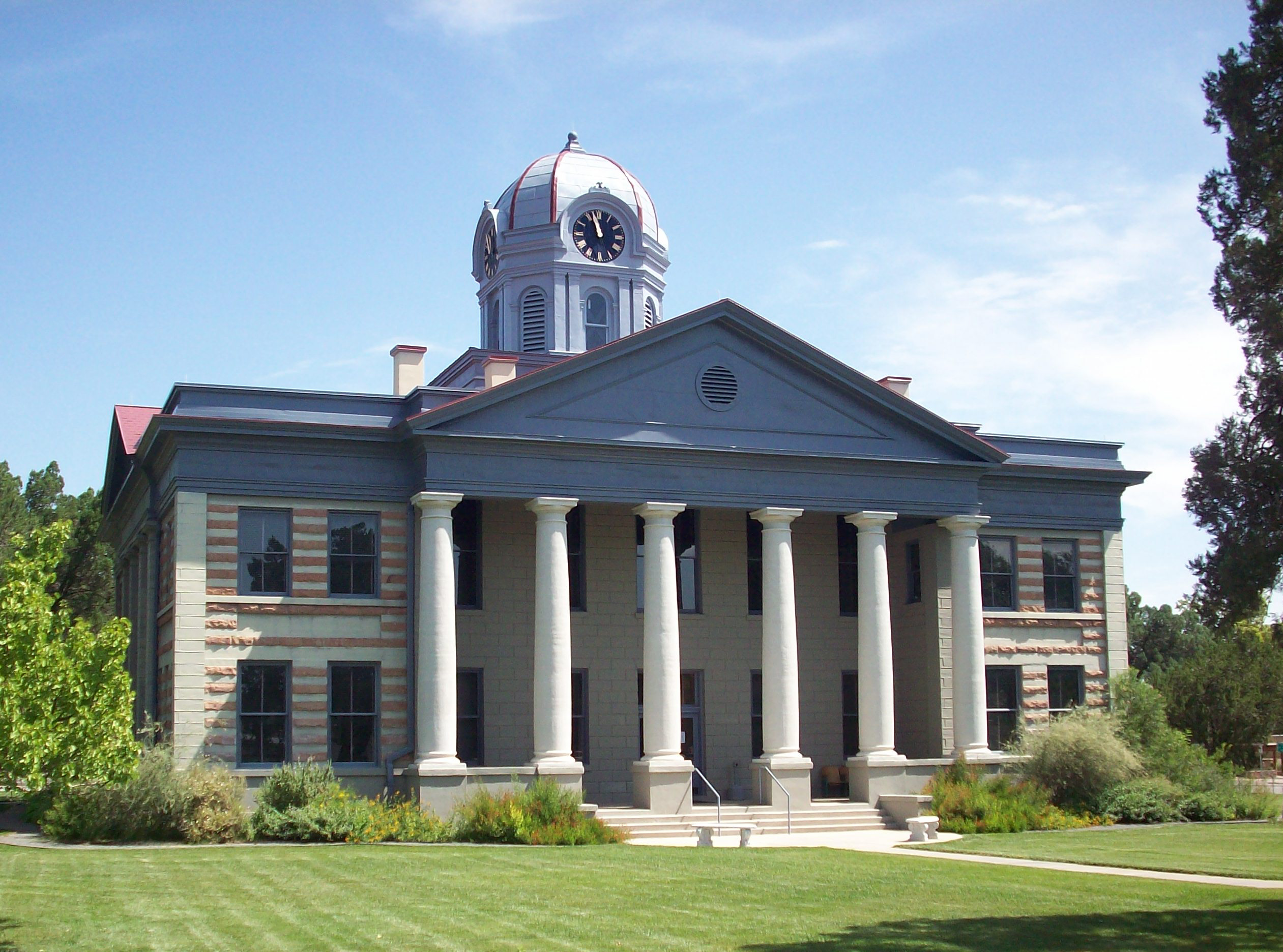
- Jeff Davis County Courthouse

- Location within Texas Location within the United States
- Interactive map showing the location of Jeff Davis County Courthouse
- Location: 100 Court Avenue, Fort Davis, Texas
- Coordinates: 30°35′19″N 103°53′43″W
- Area: 1.5 acres (0.61 ha)
- Built: 1910-1911
- Built by: Falls City Construction Co., Louisville, Kentucky
- Architect: L.L. Thurman & Co., Dallas, Texas
- Architectural style: Classic Revival / Beaux-Arts
- Website: www.co.jeff-davis.tx.us
- NRHP reference No.: 02000728
- TSAL No.: 8200002370
- RTHL No.: 12368

Significant dates
- Added to NRHP: July 11, 2002
- Designated TSAL: May 15, 2003
- Designated RTHL: 2000

The Jeff Davis County Courthouse is located in the town of Fort Davis, the seat of Jeff Davis County in the U.S. state of Texas. The courthouse was constructed between 1910-1911 and added to the National Register of Historic Places in 2002. The Texas Historical Commission (THC) has also designated the building as a Recorded Texas Historic Landmark since 2000 and, along with the surrounding courthouse square, as a State Antiquities Landmark since 2003. The surrounding county and county seat, along with the nearby historic frontier fort at Fort Davis National Historic Site, are named after Jefferson Davis, who served as U.S. war secretary at the time of the establishment of the fort and the town, and who would later become president of the Confederate States of America during the Civil War.

The courthouse is located in the town's traditionally commercial district and holds the distinction of having the highest elevation of any of the state's courthouses due to Fort Davis' altitude in the state's western Davis Mountains. The building was constructed in a Classic Revival style with recessed columned porticoes on two sides with a Beaux-Arts clock tower atop. The ground floor primarily hosts county offices while the second floor is dominated by the district courtroom.

A previous facility located on the same square from 1880 to 1911 served as the original courthouse for both Jeff Davis County and also for Presidio County from which Jeff Davis County was partitioned and of which Fort Davis also formerly served as the county seat. The older courthouse was an adobe facility that required constant maintenance and never held sufficient space to serve the needs of either county government.

The current building has also suffered over its history with poor construction requiring constant repair as well as the need for upgrades to modern infrastructure and technical standards. The courthouse underwent major renovations in the 1950s, many of which disrespected the building's original architectural design, and again in this century with THC funding that further modernized the structure while rectifying many of the previous renovation's design deficiencies bringing the building closer to its original glory. The courthouse grounds are planted mostly with native species, and continues to serve as a focal point for holiday celebrations and community observations.

== Description ==
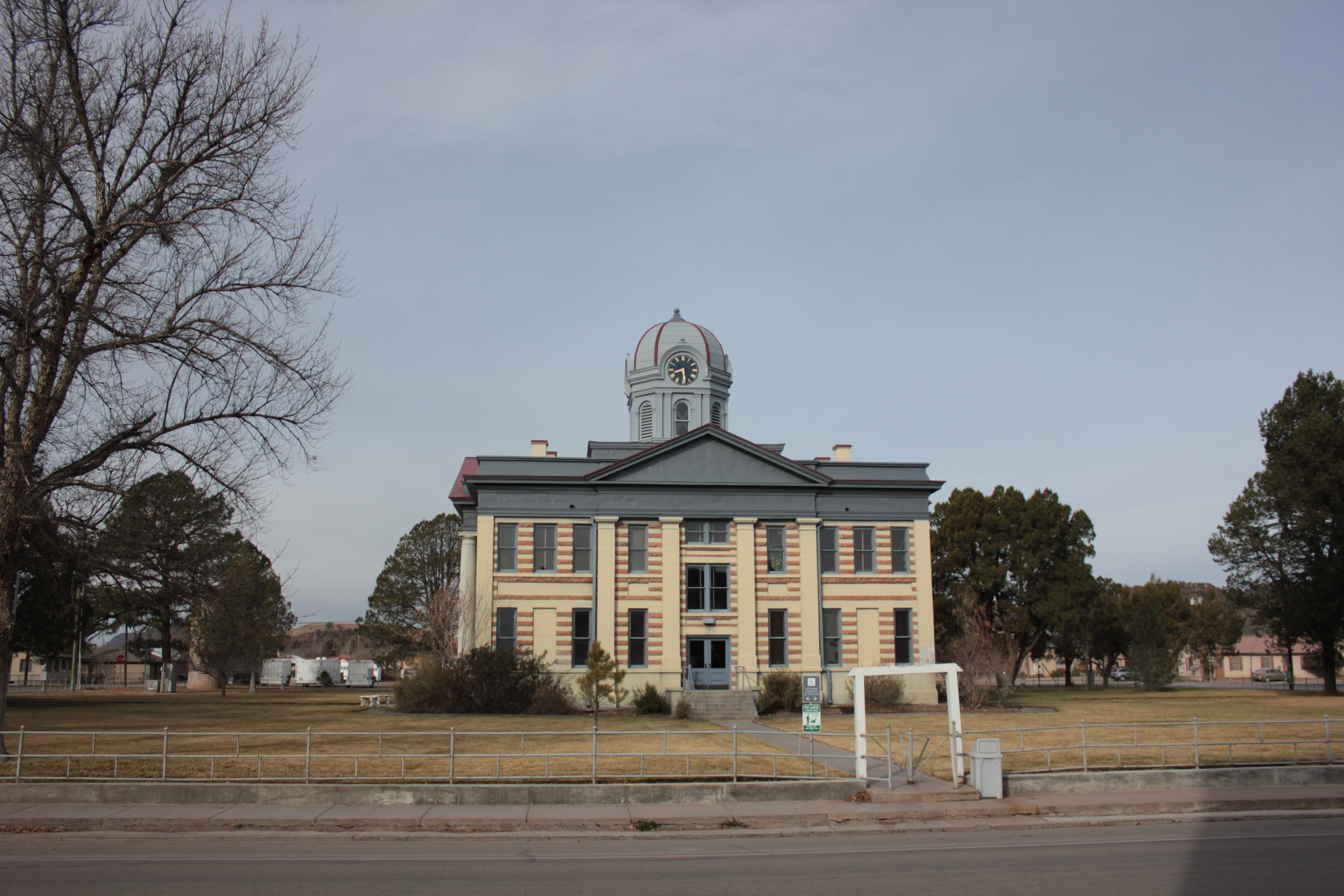
East entrance of the Jeff Davis County Courthouse facing S. State St. (SH 17 / SH 118) in Fort Davis

The courthouse is located in the center of Fort Davis' courthouse square on a block bounded by Court Avenue to the north, South State Street to the east, Woodward Avenue to the south, and South Front Street on the west. State St., along the square's eastern boundary, is the town's main thoroughfare conveying both State Highway 17 (SH 17) and SH 118 which merge just south of the square's southeastern corner at Woodward Ave. The building's official address is 100 Court Avenue along the northern face of the courthouse.

The two-story Classic Revival edifice features an exterior with alternating layers of concrete and rusticated pink native stone. Six doric columns enclose recessed pedimented porticoes on each of the northern and southern faces of the building. From the building's slab-on-grade foundation to the sill of the first-story windows is a base composed of a poured-in-place water table. Above that is the layered concrete and volcanic stone exterior walls most of which is slightly recessed from concrete block quoins. Above the second story windows begins a painted, decorative sheet metal entablature capped with a prominent cornice. Above the central portion of each of the building's four sides is a wood-framed, low-pitched, cross-gabled roof with pediments at each end covered with asphalt shingles. The four corner sections have low-pitched roofs with external gutters.

Atop the structure is a Beaux-Arts octagonal clock tower enclosing a Seth Thomas timepiece. This cupola, including its dome and rectangular base, are covered in painted, decorative sheet metal. A U.S. Geological Survey benchmark at the east side of the courthouse indicates an elevation of 4,900 feet (1,494 m) at that location, while the building itself is the highest courthouse in Texas at 5,050 feet (1,539 m). THC documentation describes the building as resembling a smaller version of the Mason County Courthouse in Mason. In addition to the building, a cylindrical concrete block cistern constructed around 1900 located on the southwest corner of the courthouse square is included as a contributing structure to the site's National Register designation.

The courthouse's base floor, elevated above the ground of the surrounding square and accessible from steps on each side of the building except the wheelchair-accessible west side, holds space for several county offices arranged around central crossing corridors connecting the entrances in the middle of each side of the building in each cardinal direction. The base floor also includes the county judge's courtroom, a vault for storage of county records, restrooms, and storage space. On the east side of the building, two flights of stairs lead to the second floor. The first flight consists of two separate stairways that combine around the base of a wider central flight ending at the second floor facing the entrance to the main courtroom. A second stairway is located south of the west end of the building's main central corridor and is used to provide access to offices and other facilities behind the upper courtroom and as use as a secondary fire escape. An elevator on the southeast side of the building also adjoins the two main floors.

The second floor of the structure is dominated by the main courtroom occupying all of the space between the north and south porticoes with windows shaded by the porticoes. The judge's podium, witness stand, and position for court officials are located beyond the west end of the courtroom which includes stained glass fixtures, including a fan-shaped ornament behind the judge's podium, filtering outside light from windows behind. The jury box is along the south wall to the right of the podium while a table for additional officials is along the north wall to the left of the podium. Tables for trial adversaries and their counsel face the podium and are separated by a central aisle. The spectator section comprises the central and eastern portions of the room and is separated by a golden oak railing from the parties of the proceedings. Above the spectator section is a balcony, often called the "buzzard's roost", providing additional spectator seating. The courtroom features a 25-foot (8 m) ornamental tin pressed ceiling. East of the courtroom on both sides of the landing of the central staircase from the first floor are additional county offices, the elevator shaft, and storage space. Stairways on both sides of the central stairway from below lead upward one flight combining to a central flight to the courtroom balcony and the east end of the third floor. The west wing of the second floor behind the judge's podium includes the judge's chamber, the jury room, additional office and storage space, and a single-toilet restroom. The fire stairway from the first floor continues upward to the third.

The east and west wings of the third floor of the courthouse are separated and unconnected due to the high ceiling of the main courtroom on the second floor beyond the courtroom's balcony. The east wing on both sides of the central stairway from the second floor leading to the courtroom balcony are storage and mechanical spaces. The small stairway on the west wing from the second floor opens into a storage area with potential office usage. This area has an additional stairway leading into the building's attic and clock house tower. The floor is narrower than the courtroom on each end of the building and above the rooftop in all of the courthouse's corner quadrants.

The surrounding courthouse square supports an arboretum featuring predominantly native tree species. Located around the courthouse grounds are several state historical markers and monuments including one recognizing the courthouse itself. Other state historical markers include one recognizing local namesake Jefferson Davis and a pink granite monument recounting the Confederate occupation and abandonment of the town and its military fort during the Civil War. An additional monument recognizes local hero Sgt. Manuel Gonzales for his valiant accomplishments during World War II. Both the Confederate and Gonzales monuments, on the northeast grounds of the square, are recognized resources as non-contributing objects as part of the site's National Register status.

At the entrance of each side of the building are semicircular landings equal in width to the steps thereby making the landings at the principal north and south entrance much larger. From each landing are straight sidewalks, first constructed in 1918, leading directly toward the streets. A fence constructed of steel pipes around 1915 lines the perimeter of the property. The fence includes turnstiles installed where the entrance sidewalks at the center of each side of the property. For greater accessibility, the west turnstile has been removed, and a larger gate has been installed on the south side.

== History ==
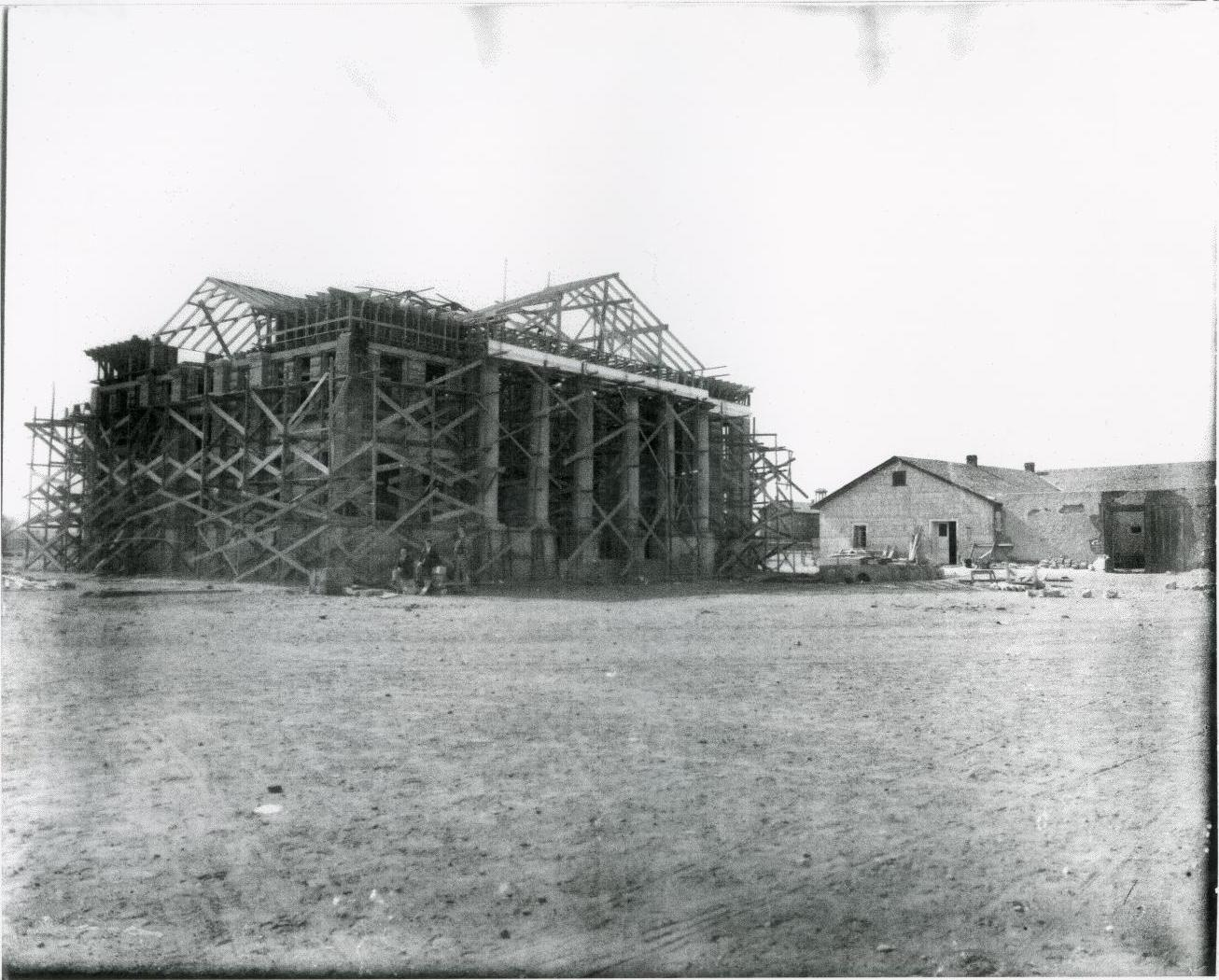
View of the east and north faces of the present Jeff Davis County Courthouse during construction between 1910-1911. To the right is the original courthouse no longer extant.

The U.S. Army garrison of Fort Davis was commissioned in 1854 enabling the settlement of the nearby supporting civilian town site under the fort's protection from hostile Native Americans. At the time, Fort Davis belonged to a much larger Presidio County, created by the Texas Legislature in 1850, that encompassed most of the present region of Texas west of the Pecos River. After several fruitless attempts, the county was successfully organized in 1875 then comprising present-day Brewster, Jeff Davis, and Presidio counties. That year, the county accepted the gift of a 1-acre (0.40 ha) land parcel in Fort Davis for the site of a future courthouse and county jail from local merchant Whittaker Keesey. Nevertheless, the county initially needed to rent office and court space, first in a dance hall, and then from space provided by another townsman while an additional local merchant rented furniture. Jail space was rented from Keesey at his family's store.

=== Original courthouse ===
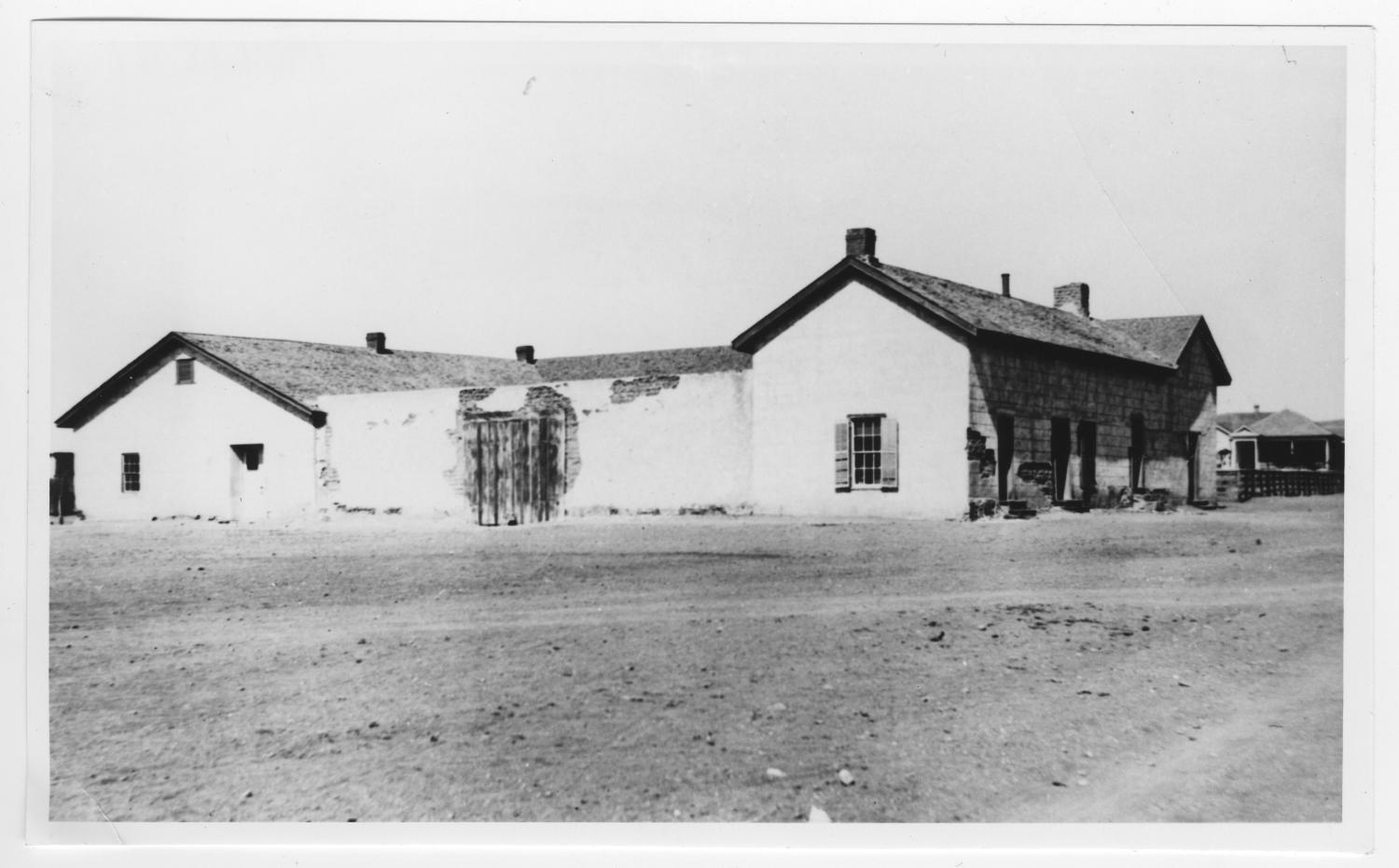
Original courthouse in Fort Davis; the handwritten description on the back of the photo may be viewed here

In 1879, the Presidio County Commissioners Court assessed a 50-cent tax per $100 valuation to finance the construction of what would become the original Presidio County Courthouse and jail on the previously donated Keesey property on the northwestern portion of the present courthouse square in Fort Davis. The Commissioners Court accepted a bid of $2,400 from William Jenkins to design and build the courthouse and jail.

The new facility, on the street corner at the northwest corner of the parcel, was completed in 1880. It was of adobe construction and fashioned into a U-shape surrounding an open courtyard. The courtyard included a well and was enclosed with a 12-foot (3.7 m) to 14-foot (4.3 m) adobe wall with a massive gate and a smaller entrance door within the gate. The building probably contained only three rooms and featured an 18-foot (5.5 m) by 20-foot (6.1 m) jail cell 8 feet (2.4 m) below the sheriff's office and guard room accessible through a trap door. The dungeon cell was poorly lit and ventilated with narrow slits of heavily barred windows along the top of the walls. This jail configuration was common among Southwestern courthouses at the time, including contemporary facilities in El Paso and San Antonio, and often referenced as "Batcaves". Prisoners were chained to six iron bull rings fastened into the walls with 2-inch (5.1 cm) wrought iron pickets located 1 foot (0.30 m) from the floor.

The guard room above included an iron cell for drunks and less dangerous prisoners including women. Due to the courthouse's small size, the county needed to rent additional office space nearly immediately after completion. The building's inadequate space combined with a leaking roof would cause repairs and improvements to consume the majority of commissioners' time after 1982. In 1883, county commissioners denounced the building as too small and badly in need of repairs. After publishing an invitation for bids to construct a new, two-floor facility, they accepted one offered by Keesey due to his original land donation. One month later, after political infighting that resulted in the resignation of the county judge, all bids were then rejected. In the aftermath, the next meeting of the Commissioners Court called for a new tax levy to provide additional rooms for the jail and county clerk's office and five iron cages for upper jail cell. Although the cages were indeed installed, there is little proof that the building underwent any further expansion. In 1884, glass was installed in the windows of the clerk's office, and the sheriff was ordered to remove the water closet and fill the well in the courtyard.

The facility would serve as the seat of Presidio County until 1885 when the town of Marfa, one of several newly emergent communities in the county along the recently constructed Southern Pacific Railroad, would take advantage of its growing political clout and force an election on whether to move the seat of government to Marfa. The election resulted in a victory by Marfa's supporters in a tally of 391-302 for a margin of 89 votes out of 693 cast. The following Commissioners Court meeting was held in Marfa and, despite many absent commissioners, ordered the transfer of county records from Fort Davis to Marfa. Despite the intransigence of some Fort Davis officeholders, the seat was effectively moved to Marfa housed in rented spaces there. Litigation would continue into the following year when the Texas Supreme Court would ultimately decide that, while the relocation of the county seat to Marfa did not carry the two-thirds majority required by state law, recommended that the Legislature divide the county recognizing increasing agitation to do so both in Fort Davis and in Murphyville, now known as Alpine.

The Legislature dutifully complied with the court's recommendation and carved Presidio County into several new ones including Jeff Davis in 1887. The newly created counties, however, were immediately saddled with their pro rata share of their parent county's debt. Furthermore, Presidio County insisted that the new counties were responsible for paying for their share of the debt on its new Presidio County Courthouse. To add insult to injury, the new Jeff Davis County found the Fort Davis courthouse, which had sat dormant for two years since the removal of the previous county seat to Marfa, to be a shell of its former self with the building's fixtures and furniture also carried off along with its former official records. The courthouse retained its iron jail cells, but remained as inadequately small and in need of reparation as it had before. By 1910, the need for a new courthouse had become eminent. Numerous repairs, including repeated patching of the roof, had been regularly necessary. Two windows, heavily barred, had been added to the west wall of the upper cell housing women and less threatening prisoners for light and ventilation. Eventually jail facilities became so intolerable that all prisoners required transport to the Presidio County jail for detention, and the building as a whole was seen as being beyond further repair. After completion of construction on the replacement courthouse and the new separate jail building in 1911, the steel cell from the original courthouse was salvaged for use in the new jail, while dirt from the demolition of the old adobe courthouse was used for leveling the grounds of the new courthouse and jail yard.

=== Present courthouse ===
In May 1910, county securities at six percent interest were issued to pay for the new courthouse and separate county jail to be paid with a 25-cent per $100 property tax. The architectural firm L.L. Thurman & Co. of Dallas, who would soon after design the current Henderson County Courthouse in Athens, was selected to design the courthouse and jail facilities at a cost not to exceed $6,000. Strips of land adjoining the south and east sides of the previous courthouse property were purchased from W. Keesey to extend the courthouse square to the entire block of the street grid. By August, the county would accept a $47,000 bid from Falls City Construction Co. of Louisville, Kentucky to construct the courthouse at the center of the newly expanded square immediately southeast of the previous facility. The new jail was built concurrently directly south across Woodward Ave. from the square. The jail, no longer used for that purpose but since serving in recent years for county offices, is itself a Recorded Texas Historic Landmark. Construction of both the courthouse and jail were finished in early March 1911, and their completion was celebrated with a community dance in the courtroom on March 13. Once county offices had vacated the previous courthouse and jail, bids were accepted for the demolition of the previous facility. After construction debts were paid, the special tax was rescinded in May 1920.

Currently, State St., which conveys both state highways passing through Fort Davis and which runs along the east of the square, serves as the town's principal street. In earlier years, however, Front St. along the west side of the square performed that role as that street was historically the route of the Butterfield Overland Mail through town.

The ground floor of the new courthouse featured six offices each of which was heated with its own fireplace, a large room for Commissioners Court meetings, and a fire-proof vault for archiving county records. The second floor held the courtroom, more offices, a jury room, and a barred detention cell. A many-cupped chandelier lighted the courtroom from its high ceiling. At that time, the judge's bench was merely a flat-topped desk and chair. The half-story third floor served as little more than an attic with stairs leading to the clock tower. The 1910-model Seth Thomas clock with faces at each of the building's four sides was a pendulum-driven device constituted of metal-coated wooden gears and two rock-filled wooden boxes acting as weights. Maintenance required someone to climb three flights of steps plus two ladders weekly for winding. A 700-pound (318 kg) bell for striking the hours was also used as a fire signal and designated as an alert, if necessary, during the Mexican Revolution and World War II. The clock resulted in a $1,700 additional expense to the building despite problems with accuracy or even displaying the same time on its four faces. Installed shortly after the building was completed were hail screens to protect the windows and acetylene gas lights utilizing a pressurizing machine in the new jail yard. Although a water well was drilled in the jail yard, the courthouse did not have running water, toilets, or a septic tank until May 1914. Subsequently, a men's restroom was installed on the ground floor while a single women's toilet was placed in the second floor as women were not widely seen as participants in county government before passage of the Nineteenth Amendment.

Over the years, most changes to the courthouse amounted to mere maintenance such as adopting to new technological and public utility standards including electrical lighting, telephone, water, and sewer service. Fireplaces had been replaced by distillate stoves requiring the building's dozen chimneys to be raised by 6 feet (1.8 m) to properly draw air, but these caused soot-stained rainwater to discolor interior walls. In a throwback to the problems plaguing the previous courthouse, the county was constantly needing to replace leaking roofs in the new building. Between 1939 and 1941, an arboretum containing mostly native flora was planted on the square. The arboretum landscaping was authorized in 1938 as a Works Progress Administration program.

It was not until the 1950s that the courthouse undertook major renovations. In 1955, the distillate stoves were replaced with butane heaters allowing the chimneys to be reduced to roof level while the roof was also replaced. In 1956, the roof would be replaced again for the fifth or sixth time since the building's completion in 1911. New flooring was installed in the courtroom and some offices, and the courtroom ceiling was lowered for acoustics and heating. In the courtroom, theater-style seating was installed while the upper gallery was removed. A new plywood bench for the judge and a jury box with matching railing were built. The stained glass window behind the judge's bench was boarded and plastered. Downstairs, exterior steel doors were installed, and a counter shelf was built for the office of the sheriff and tax-assessor collector along with five fire extinguishers provided for the premises. In 1957, two gas heaters with electric blowers were installed in the space formerly occupied by the courtroom's upper gallery to heat the courtroom. The building's roof would require replacement in 1974 and again 1975.

Between 2002 and 2003, the courthouse underwent a major restoration that involved, not only electrical, mechanical and plumbing improvements as well as necessary accessibility enhancements such as the installation of an elevator, but also the correction of many architecturally insensitive modifications undergone previously. These included restoring the balcony and original furnishings in the courtroom and faux wood and metal ceiling finishes throughout the building. Exterior improvements included repairs to doors, windows and masonry, a new metal shingle roof, sheet metal repairs to cornices, and renovation of the clock tower. These renovations were performed at a cost of $2.8 million supported by a THC grant of $2.3 million with the remainder supported by local funding. The grant was administered as part of the THC's Texas Historic Courthouse Preservation Program, created to support counties preserve their current and former historic courthouses after the state's historic courthouses were included in the 1998 listing of most endangered historic places by the National Trust for Historic Preservation.

== See also ==
- National Register of Historic Places listings in Jeff Davis County, Texas
- Recorded Texas Historic Landmarks in Jeff Davis County
- List of county courthouses in Texas
