= Fort Davis National Historic Site =

National Historic Site of the United States

- U.S. National Register of Historic Places
- U.S. National Historic Landmark
- U.S. National Historic Site
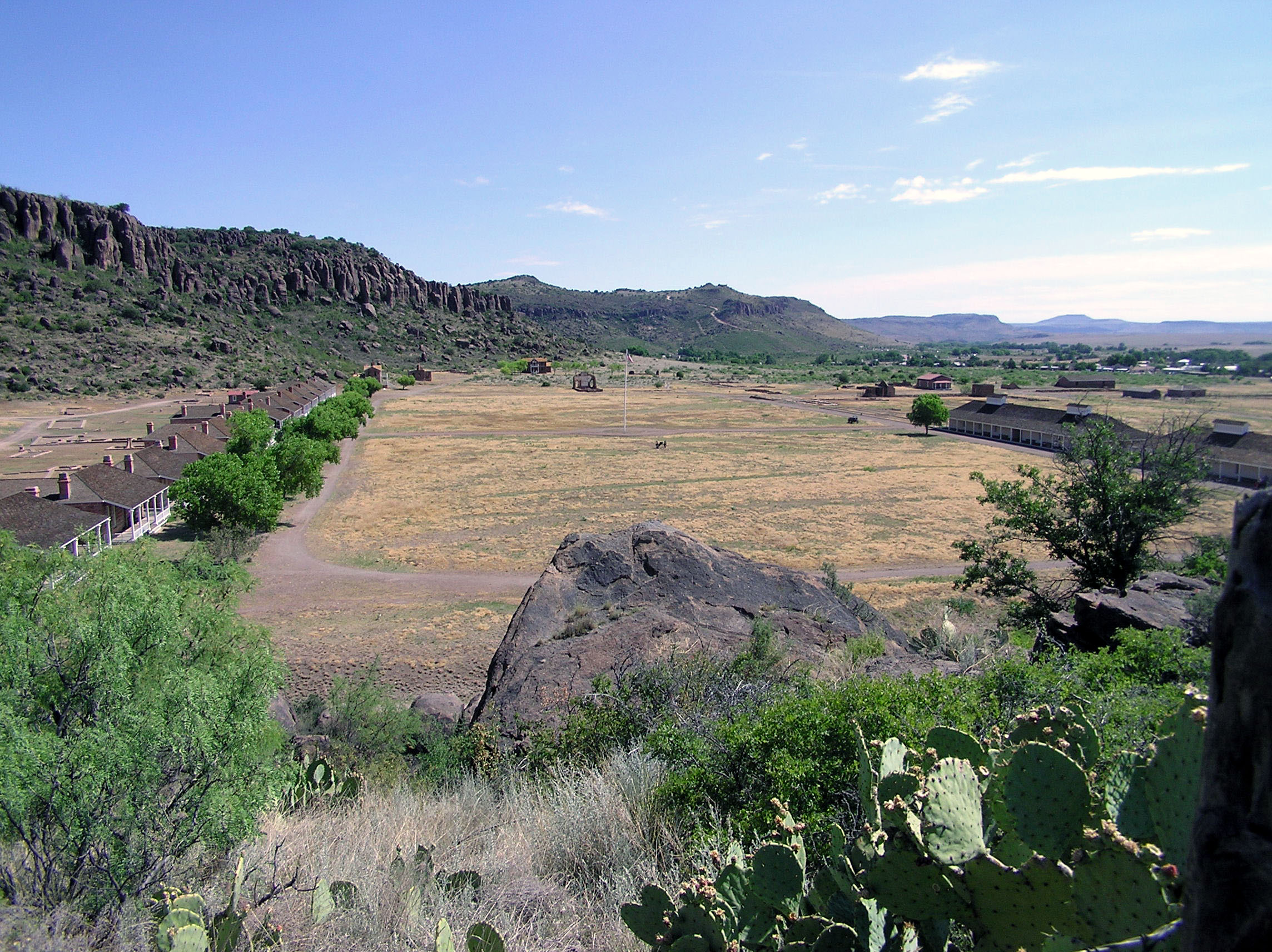
- Fort Davis National Historic Site

- Location within Texas Location within the United States
- Location: 101 Lt. Flipper Dr. Fort Davis, Texas
- Coordinates: 30°35′57″N 103°53′34″W
- Area: 523 acres (212 ha)
- Built: 1854
- Architect: Lt. Col. Wesley Merritt
- Visitation: 35,580 (2025)
- Website: Fort Davis National Historic Site
- NRHP reference No.: 66000045

Significant dates
- Added to NRHP: October 15, 1966
- Designated NHL: December 19, 1960
- Designated NHS: September 8, 1961

Fort Davis National Historic Site is a United States national historic site located in the unincorporated community of Fort Davis, Jeff Davis County, Texas. Located within the Davis Mountains of West Texas, the historic site was established in 1961 to protect one of the best remaining examples of a United States Army fort in the southwestern United States.

== History ==
Established in October 1854 along the Limpia Creek at Painted Comanche Camp by Bvt. Maj. Gen. Persifor Frazer Smith, Fort Davis was named after Jefferson Davis, then Secretary of War, and later the President of the Confederate States of America. "Hoping to protect the garrison from winter northers, Smith tucked the fort into a canyon flanked on three sides by sheer rock walls." Commanding the post was 8th Infantry Regiment commander Lt. Col. Washington Seawell.

Other forts in the frontier fort system were Forts Griffin, Concho, Belknap, Chadbourne, Stockton, Richardson, Bliss, McKavett, Clark, McIntosh, Inge, and Phantom Hill in Texas, and Fort Sill in Oklahoma. "Sub posts or intermediate stations" also were used, including Bothwick's Station on Salt Creek between Fort Richardson and Fort Belknap, Camp Wichita near Buffalo Springs between Fort Richardson and Red River Station, and Mountain Pass between Fort Concho and Fort Griffin.

From 1854 to 1891, Fort Davis was strategically located to protect emigrants, mail coaches, and freight wagons on the trans-Pecos portion of the San Antonio-El Paso Road and the Chihuahua Trail, and to control activities on the southern stem of the Great Comanche and Mescalero Apache war trails.

The fort was evacuated in April 1861 under orders from General David E. Twiggs at the start of the Civil War. During John R. Baylor's invasion of New Mexico, only 20 Confederate States Army troops defended the fort. On the night of 4 August 1861, Mescalero Apaches raided a nearby cattle pen, and during the pursuit on 11 August, Lt. Reuben E. Mays and all but one of his 13-man patrol were killed in an ambush. This defeat convinced Baylor to staff the fort with three officers and 70 enlisted men. The Confederates evacuated the fort and all other posts west of Fort Clark in August 1862.

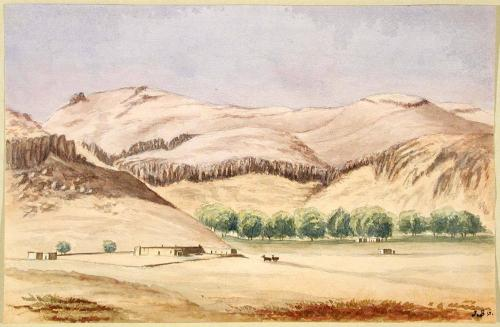
Stage Station at Fort Davis, Texas in 1880 (Joseph Basil Girard, watercolor painted 1908, Huntington Museum collection)

After the war, the U.S. reoccupied the fort on 29 June 1867. Fort Davis is important in understanding the presence of African Americans in the West and in the frontier military because the 24th and 25th U.S. Infantry regiments and the 9th and 10th U.S. Cavalry regiments, all-black regiments (known as the buffalo soldiers), which were established after the Civil War, were stationed at the post. Lt. Col. Wesley Merritt led Troops C, F, H, and I of the 9th Cavalry in reoccupying the fort. They rebuilt the fort, using limestone and adobe, outside the canyon walls.

== Preservation ==
Today, 24 restored historic buildings and over 100 ruins and foundations are part of Fort Davis National Historic Site. Five of the historic buildings have been refurbished to the 1880s, making it envisioning themselves being at the fort at the height of its development easy for visitors. A self-guided tour of the fort begins at the site's visitor center. Living history demonstrations are common during the summer.

Fort Davis National Historic Site was authorized as a unit of the National Park System in 1961, and was designated a National Historic Landmark in 1960.

A memorial at Fort Davis honors the heroism of Indian Emily, the fictional subject of a popular legend. Actress Jolene Brand portrayed "Indian Emily", who saved the fort from an Apache attack, in the 1959 episode of the same name on the syndicated television anthology series Death Valley Days, hosted by Stanley Andrews. Emily adopts the white man's ways, but flees when a young officer, Tom Easton (Burt Metcalfe), whom she loves, prepares to marry another. She returns to warn the fort of a pending Apache attack, but dies of a gunshot wound fired in error. Meg Wyllie played Tom's compassionate mother, Mrs. Easton.

== Gallery ==
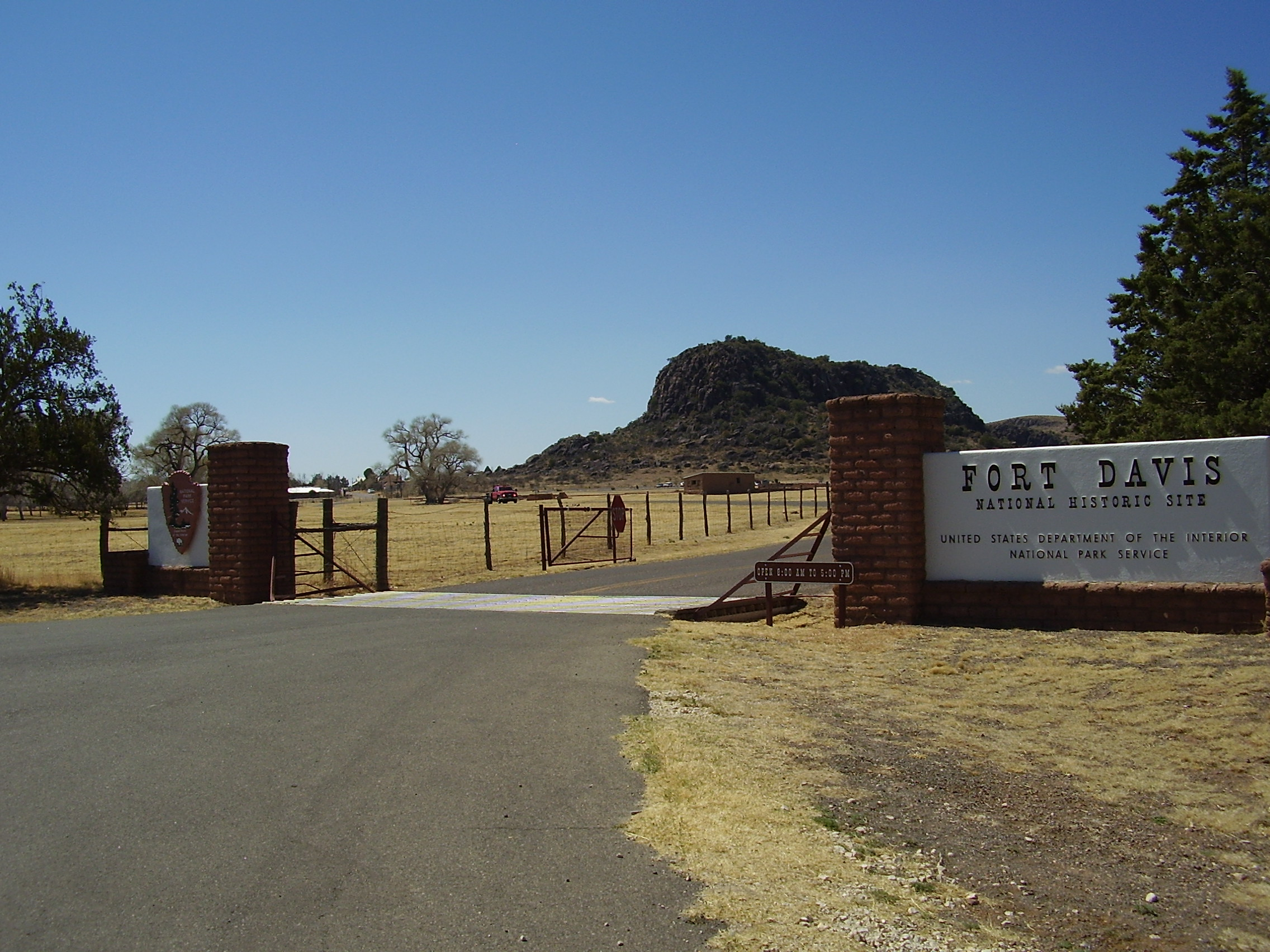
Main entrance to the Fort Davis National Historic Site

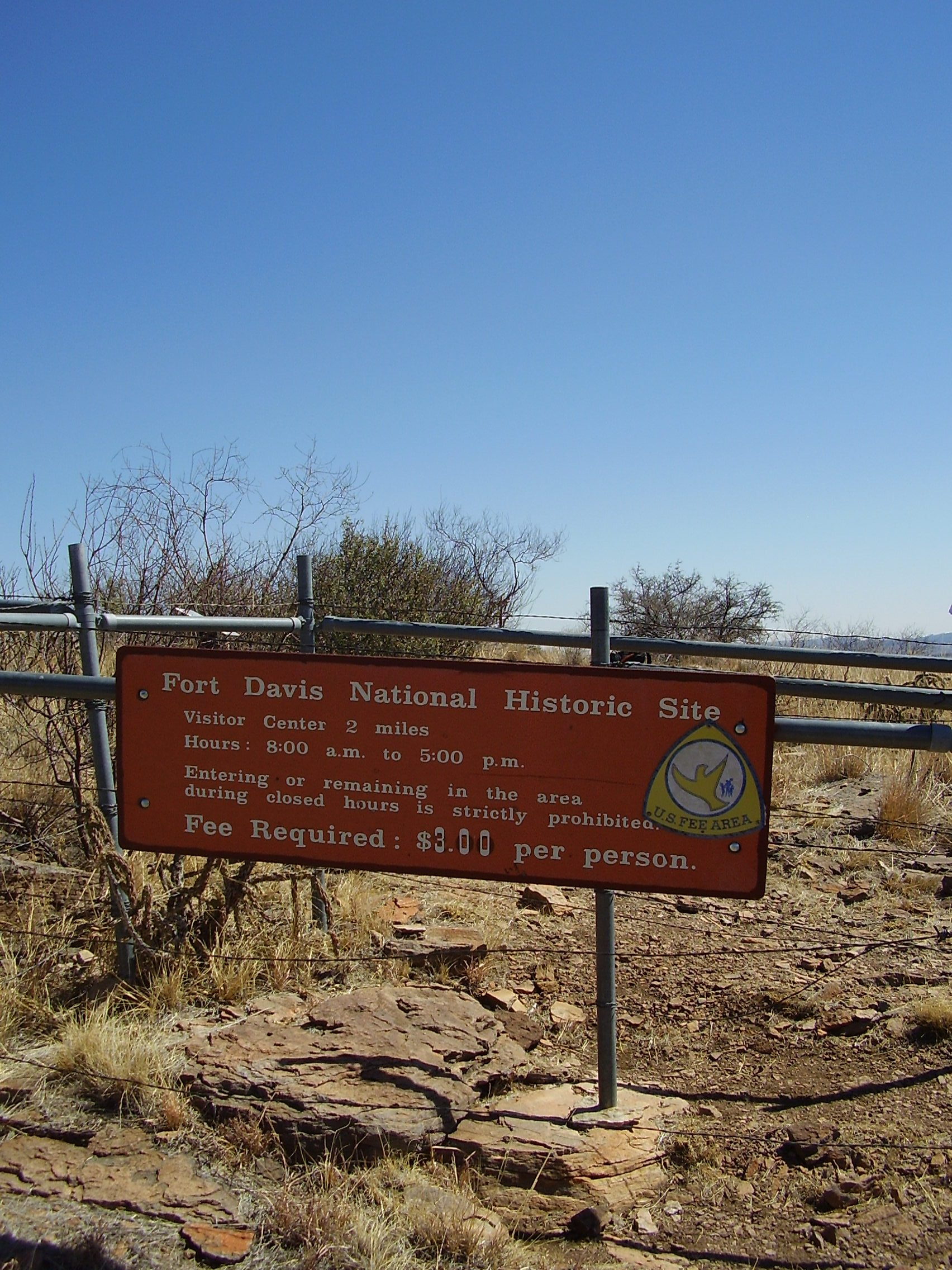
Entrance to the Fort Davis National Historic Site from the Davis Mountains State Park

Fort Davis campaign map
A hand-drawn military map from the 1880 campaign against Victorio and his Chiricahua Apaches, image from the Special Collections of The University of Texas at Arlington Library

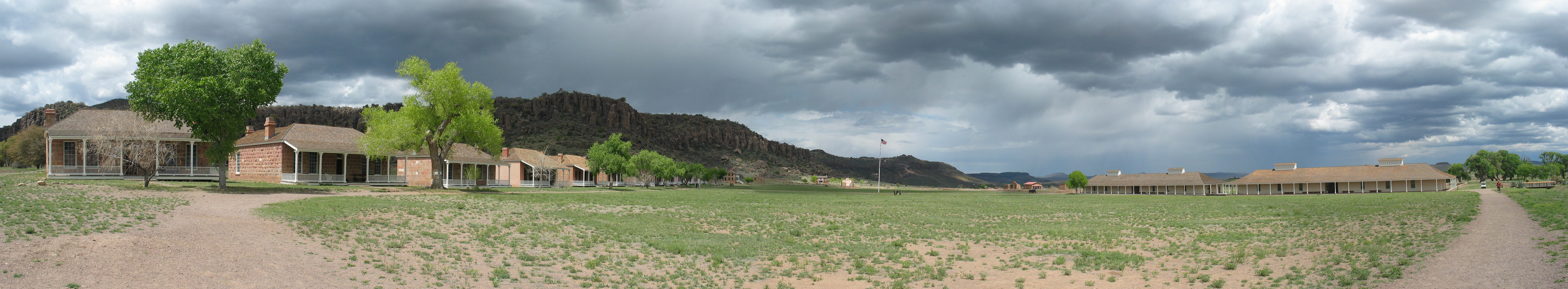
Fort Davis drill ground

== See also ==
- Forts of Texas
- Henry Flipper
- William Rufus Shafter
- National Register of Historic Places listings in Jeff Davis County, Texas
- List of National Historic Landmarks in Texas
