= Jeff Davis County, Texas =

County in Texas, United States

- County
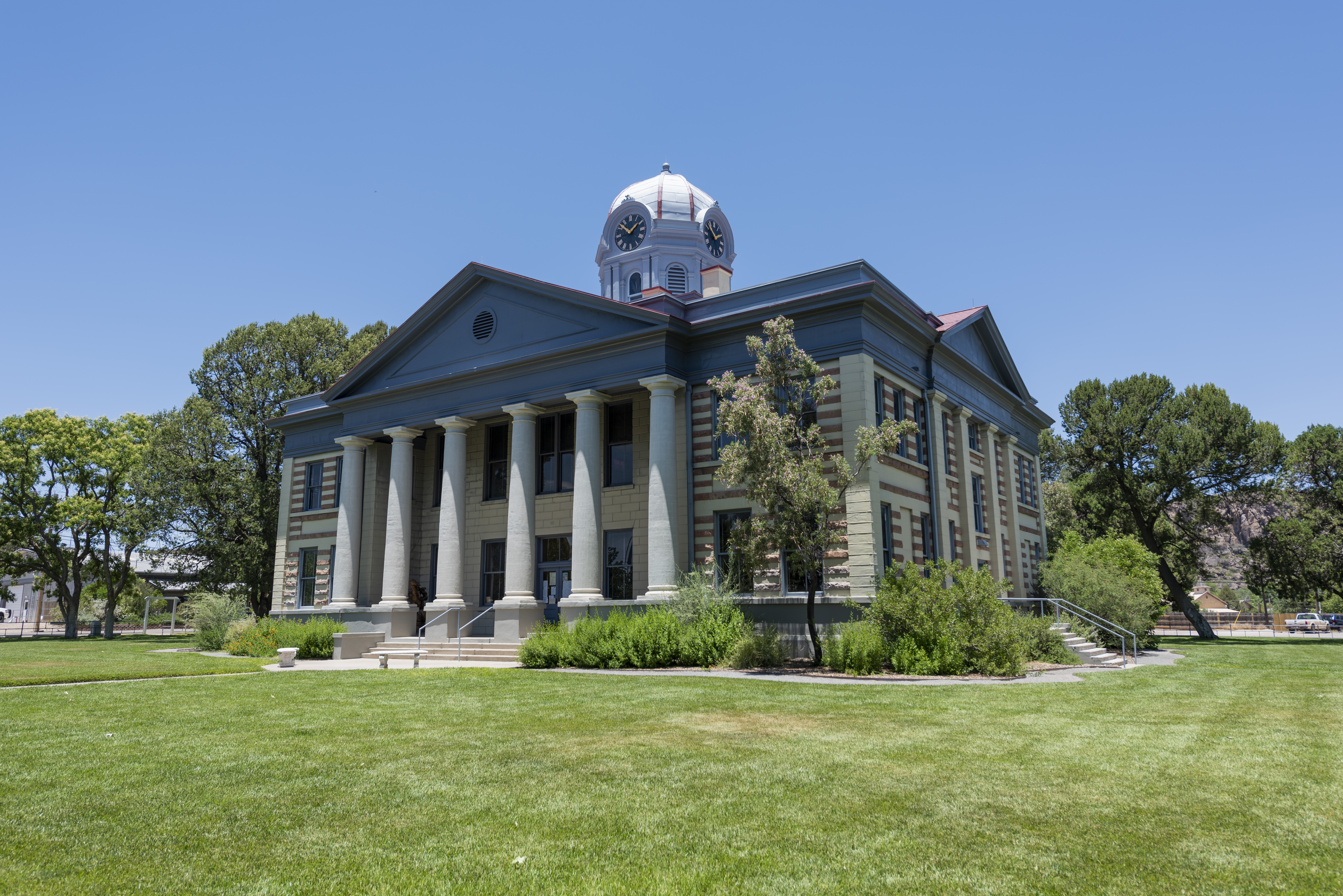
- Jeff Davis County Courthouse in Fort Davis

- Location within the U.S. state of Texas
- Coordinates: 30°43′N 104°08′W
- Country: United States
- State: Texas
- Founded: 1887
- Named for: Jefferson Davis
- Seat: Fort Davis
- Largest town: Fort Davis

Area
  - Total: 2,265 sq mi (5,870 km^{2})
  - Land: 2,265 sq mi (5,870 km^{2})
  - Water: 0.08 sq mi (0.21 km^{2}) 0%

Population (2020)
  - Total: 1,996
  - Estimate (2025): 1,711 ▼
  - Density: 0.8812/sq mi (0.3402/km^{2})
- Time zone: UTC−6 (Central)
  - Summer (DST): UTC−5 (CDT)
- Congressional district: 23rd
- Website: www.jeffdaviscounty.texas.gov

Jeff Davis County is a county in the U.S. state of Texas. As of the 2020 census, its population was 1,996. Its county seat is Fort Davis. The county is named for Jefferson Davis, who served as the 23rd United States Secretary of War in the 1850s, and as Confederate president.

Jeff Davis County is recognizable for its unique shape; it is a pentagon that has no north–south nor east–west boundaries, save for a six-mile line serving as its southern boundary. It is the only county in the United States that touches a foreign country (Mexico) at a single point. Jeff Davis is one of the nine counties that compose the Trans-Pecos region of West Texas.

The county contains the 270,000-acre (1,100 km^{2}) Texas Davis Mountains American Viticultural Area. About 50 acres (0.2 km^{2}) are "under vine". The McDonald Observatory, owned by the University of Texas at Austin, is located near Fort Davis.

== History ==
=== Native Americans ===
Prehistoric peoples camped at Phantom Lake Spring, in present-day northeastern Jeff Davis County, and may have used the springs for irrigation. Indian pictographs in the Painted Comanche Camp of Limpia Canyon were discovered by the Whiting and Smith Expedition of 1849.

As white migrants moved into the area, tensions with Native Americans increased. The groups competed for resources, and armed conflicts were conducted for more than two decades, especially after the Civil War. In August 1861, Mescalero Apache under Chief Nicolas attacked Fort Davis, driving off livestock and killing three people. In the ensuing chase by the cavalry, Nicolas ambushed the soldiers, killing them all.

In September 1868 at Horsehead Hills, a group of volunteer Mexican and buffalo soldiers from Fort Davis attacked and destroyed a Mescalero village to recover captives and stolen livestock. In January 1870, a group of soldiers attacked a Mescalero Apache village near Delaware Creek in the Guadalupe Mountains. In July 1880, soldiers at Tinaja de las Palmas attacked a group of Mescaleros led by Chief Victorio. In August 1880, buffalo soldiers ambushed Victorio at Rattlesnake Springs. Victorio retreated to Mexico, where he was killed in October of that year by Mexican soldiers. The last Indian depredation in the area was at Barry Scobee Mountain in 1881.

=== Early days ===
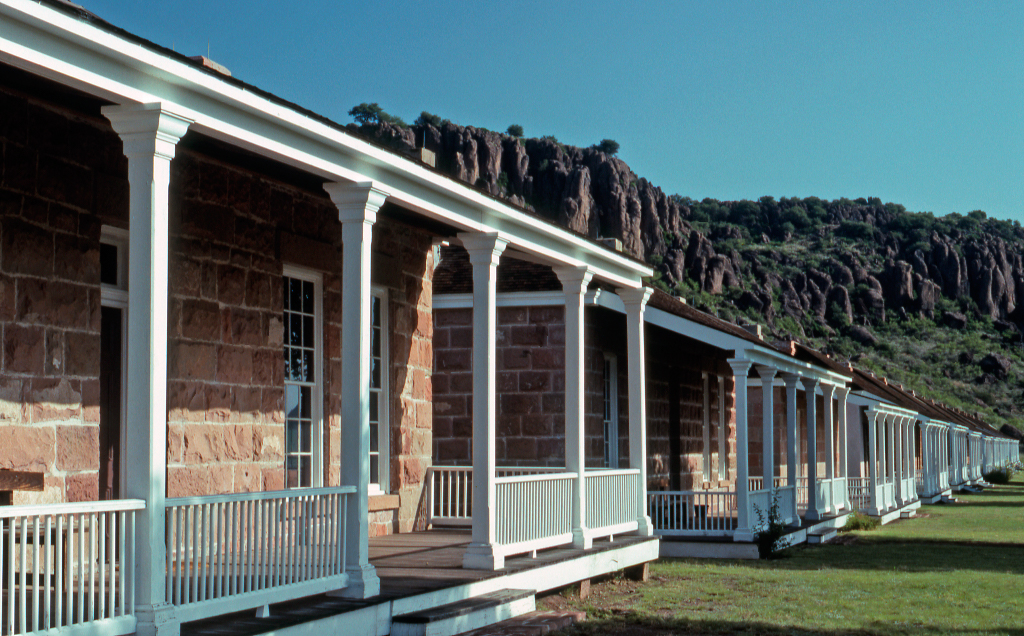
Officers Row at Fort Davis National Historic Site

In March 1849, Lieutenants William H. C. Whiting and William F. Smith were sent out by Maj. Gen. William J. Worth of the Texas 8th Military Department to look for a route from San Antonio to El Paso del Norte. A second party, led by Dr. John S. Ford and financed by a group of Austin merchants, pioneered a trail that ran north of the Davis Mountains before turning southward toward El Paso. In June 1849 Lt. Col. Joseph E. Johnston, attached to Bvt. Maj. Jefferson Van Horne's battalion, was sent for additional surveying.

At El Paso, Horne established Fort Bliss. Texas Ranger Big Foot Wallace escorted the San Antonio-El Paso Mail coach through the mountains. Fort Davis was established in 1854. The land was leased from surveyor John James at $300 a year. The federal government surrendered the fort to the Confederacy in 1861. The CSA abandoned it in 1862 after their defeat at Glorieta Pass, New Mexico. The facility was reoccupied by U.S. troops on July 1, 1867, as a base for actions against Native American forces.

=== County establishment and growth ===
The Texas Legislature established Jeff Davis County on March 15, 1887. Fort Davis was named as the county seat. Cattle ranchers began operating in the county in the 1880s. The towns of Valentine and Chispa became supply centers for the ranchers and were later designated as railroad stops as railway construction entered the area.

Fort Davis has always been the county's largest town. By 1970, Madera Springs was known as the smallest town in Texas. Davis Mountains State Park opened to the public in the 1930s, improved during the Great Depression.

The Davis Mountains region saw continued growth in cultural and scientific significance throughout the mid-20th century. The establishment of the McDonald Observatory in 1939 marked a major milestone, positioning the area as an important center for astronomical research due to its high elevation and exceptionally dark skies. Over the following decades, the observatory expanded its facilities and public outreach, drawing researchers and visitors from around the world.

Tourism and conservation efforts also increased during this period. Improvements to road infrastructure, including the scenic loop connecting Fort Davis to surrounding mountain areas, made the region more accessible while preserving its natural beauty. These developments helped establish Jeff Davis County as a destination for both scientific study and outdoor recreation, blending education, preservation and tourism in a uniquely West Texas setting.

Fort Davis National Historic Site was established in 1961. The Chihuahuan Desert Research Institute arboretum was established in 1974.

== Geography ==
According to the U.S. Census Bureau, the county has a total area of 2,265 square miles (5,870 km^{2}), virtually all of which is land. The county is home to the Davis Mountains, the highest mountain range located entirely within Texas.

=== Protected areas ===
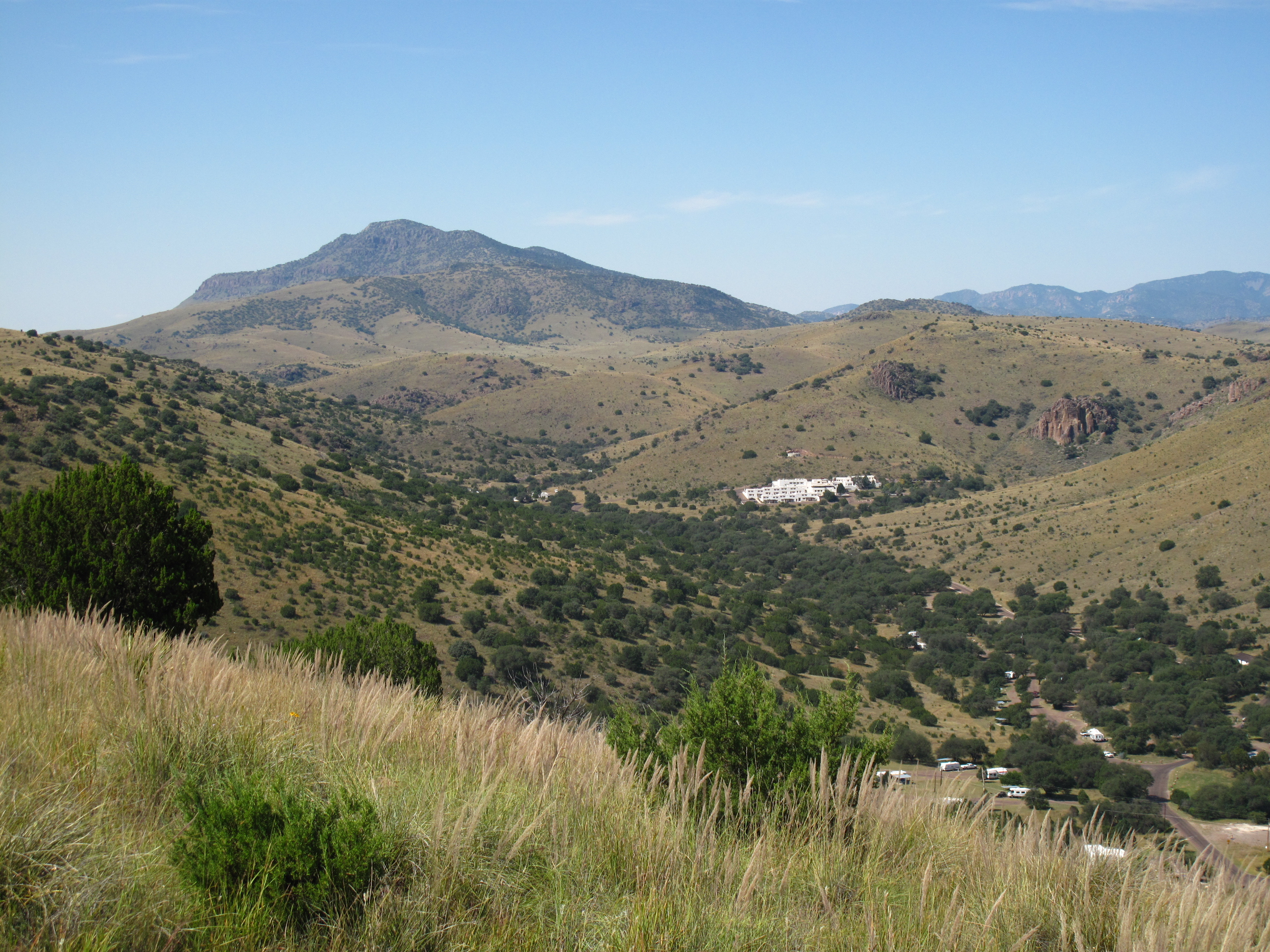
Indian Lodge at Davis Mountains State Park

The county has parks and preserves maintained by federal and state park services, in addition to the Chihuahuan Desert Research Institute and the Nature Conservancy of Texas. In addition to the properties listed below, the Nature Conservancy has been instrumental in the creation of conservation easements protecting an additional 69,600 acres (28,200 ha) of private property surrounding its preserve.

Park or preserve	Maintaining authority	Area	Year established
Chihuahuan Desert Nature Center and Botanical Gardens	Chihuahuan Desert Research Institute	507 acres (205 ha)	1978
Davis Mountains State Park	Texas Parks and Wildlife Department	2,709 acres (1,096 ha)	1933
Davis Mountains Preserve	The Nature Conservancy of Texas	33,075 acres (13,385 ha)	1997
Fort Davis National Historic Site	National Park Service	523 acres (212 ha)	1961

=== Major highways ===
- Interstate 10
- U.S. Highway 90
- State Highway 17
- State Highway 118
- State Highway 166
- Spur 77
- Spur 78

=== Adjacent counties and municipalities ===
- Reeves County (north)
- Pecos County (north)
- Brewster County (southeast)
- Presidio County (south)
- Guadalupe, Chihuahua, Mexico (west)
- Hudspeth County (northwest)
- Culberson County (north)

== Climate ==
Jeff Davis County predominantly experiences a semiarid steppe climate with 83.0% of the county classified as cold semiarid (Köppen BSk) and 0.4% classified as hot semiarid (Köppen BSh). An additional 16.5% is classified as having a hot arid desert climate (Köppen BWh). Within the county, precipitation increases while daytime and nighttime temperatures generally become milder with increasing elevation. Rainfall is most abundant from May through October. Snowfall is also more abundant at higher elevations despite having higher wintertime average low temperatures.

Fort Davis

- Coordinates: 30.59972°N 103.88694°W
- Elevation: 4,892 feet (1,491 m)

Climate data for Fort Davis, Texas (January 1, 1902–March 31, 2013)
Month	Jan	Feb	Mar	Apr	May	Jun	Jul	Aug	Sep	Oct	Nov	Dec	Year
Mean daily maximum °F (°C)	60.8 (16.0)	64.4 (18.0)	71.3 (21.8)	78.9 (26.1)	85.8 (29.9)	90.3 (32.4)	88.4 (31.3)	87.4 (30.8)	83.2 (28.4)	76.9 (24.9)	67.5 (19.7)	60.6 (15.9)	76.3 (24.6)
Mean daily minimum °F (°C)	28.8 (−1.8)	31.8 (−0.1)	37.3 (2.9)	45.0 (7.2)	53.4 (11.9)	60.3 (15.7)	62.1 (16.7)	61.0 (16.1)	55.3 (12.9)	45.7 (7.6)	35.9 (2.2)	29.7 (−1.3)	45.5 (7.5)
Average precipitation inches (mm)	0.50 (13)	0.46 (12)	0.38 (9.7)	0.54 (14)	1.31 (33)	1.98 (50)	2.85 (72)	2.91 (74)	2.27 (58)	1.35 (34)	0.54 (14)	0.55 (14)	15.64 (397.7)
Source: Western Regional Climate Center, Desert Research Institute

McDonald Observatory

- Coordinates: 30.70528°N 104.02333°W
- Elevation: 6,790 feet (2,070 m)

Climate data for Mount Locke, Texas (January 1, 1935–March 31, 2013)
Month	Jan	Feb	Mar	Apr	May	Jun	Jul	Aug	Sep	Oct	Nov	Dec	Year
Mean daily maximum °F (°C)	53.5 (11.9)	56.9 (13.8)	63.7 (17.6)	71.4 (21.9)	78.6 (25.9)	84.5 (29.2)	82.7 (28.2)	81.3 (27.4)	76.6 (24.8)	70.5 (21.4)	61.2 (16.2)	54.4 (12.4)	69.6 (20.9)
Mean daily minimum °F (°C)	32.0 (0.0)	33.9 (1.1)	38.2 (3.4)	45.2 (7.3)	52.4 (11.3)	58.2 (14.6)	58.9 (14.9)	58.4 (14.7)	54.4 (12.4)	48.0 (8.9)	38.7 (3.7)	33.6 (0.9)	46.0 (7.8)
Average precipitation inches (mm)	0.68 (17)	0.49 (12)	0.40 (10)	0.50 (13)	1.63 (41)	2.49 (63)	3.82 (97)	3.69 (94)	2.95 (75)	1.61 (41)	0.61 (15)	0.60 (15)	19.47 (493)
Source: Western Regional Climate Center, Desert Research Institute

Valentine

- Coordinates: 30.59083°N 104.49139°W
- Elevation: 4,440 feet (1,353 m)

Climate data for Valentine, Texas (June 1, 1978–March 31, 2013)
Month	Jan	Feb	Mar	Apr	May	Jun	Jul	Aug	Sep	Oct	Nov	Dec	Year
Mean daily maximum °F (°C)	60.3 (15.7)	65.0 (18.3)	72.0 (22.2)	80.0 (26.7)	87.7 (30.9)	93.8 (34.3)	92.1 (33.4)	90.3 (32.4)	86.0 (30.0)	78.9 (26.1)	68.3 (20.2)	60.6 (15.9)	77.9 (25.5)
Mean daily minimum °F (°C)	27.0 (−2.8)	30.5 (−0.8)	36.0 (2.2)	43.3 (6.3)	52.2 (11.2)	60.9 (16.1)	62.9 (17.2)	61.6 (16.4)	56.3 (13.5)	46.6 (8.1)	35.1 (1.7)	27.7 (−2.4)	45.0 (7.2)
Average precipitation inches (mm)	0.42 (11)	0.46 (12)	0.24 (6.1)	0.42 (11)	0.77 (20)	1.99 (51)	2.46 (62)	2.22 (56)	2.11 (54)	1.33 (34)	0.50 (13)	0.53 (13)	13.45 (343.1)
Source: Western Regional Climate Center, Desert Research Institute

== Demographics ==
Historical population
Census	Pop.	Note	%±
1890	1,394		—
1900	1,150		−17.5%
1910	1,678		45.9%
1920	1,445		−13.9%
1930	1,800		24.6%
1940	2,375		31.9%
1950	2,090		−12.0%
1960	1,582		−24.3%
1970	1,527		−3.5%
1980	1,647		7.9%
1990	1,946		18.2%
2000	2,207		13.4%
2010	2,342		6.1%
2020	1,996		−14.8%
2025 (est.)	1,711	▼	−14.3%
U.S. Decennial Census; 1850–2010 2010–2014 2020

=== Racial and ethnic composition ===
Jeff Davis County, Texas – Racial and ethnic composition Note: the US Census treats Hispanic/Latino as an ethnic category. This table excludes Latinos from the racial categories and assigns them to a separate category. Hispanics/Latinos may be of any race.
Race / Ethnicity (NH = Non-Hispanic)	Pop 1980	Pop 1990	Pop 2000	Pop 2010	Pop 2020	% 1980	% 1990	% 2000	% 2010	% 2020
White alone (NH)	866	1,154	1,376	1,490	1,282	52.58%	59.30%	62.35%	63.62%	64.23%
Black or African American alone (NH)	2	6	16	10	0	0.12%	0.31%	0.72%	0.43%	0.00%
Native American or Alaska Native alone (NH)	1	12	6	8	6	0.06%	0.62%	0.27%	0.34%	0.30%
Asian alone (NH)	1	4	2	7	14	0.06%	0.21%	0.09%	0.30%	0.70%
Native Hawaiian or Pacific Islander alone (NH)	x	x	0	1	0	x	x	0.00%	0.04%	0.00%
Other race alone (NH)	0	0	1	1	15	0.00%	0.00%	0.05%	0.04%	0.75%
Mixed race or Multiracial (NH)	x	x	23	35	66	x	x	1.04%	1.49%	3.31%
Hispanic or Latino (any race)	777	770	783	790	613	47.18%	39.57%	35.48%	33.73%	30.71%
Total	1,647	1,946	2,207	2,342	1,996	100.00%	100.00%	100.00%	100.00%	100.00%

=== 2020 census ===
As of the 2020 census, the county had a population of 1,996. The median age was 58.4 years. 14.3% of residents were under the age of 18 and 35.4% of residents were 65 years of age or older. For every 100 females there were 99.0 males, and for every 100 females age 18 and over there were 102.5 males age 18 and over.

As of the 2020 census, the racial makeup of the county was 73.5% White, 0.1% Black or African American, 1.3% American Indian and Alaska Native, 0.8% Asian, 0.1% Native Hawaiian and Pacific Islander, 7.7% from some other race, and 16.6% from two or more races. Hispanic or Latino residents of any race comprised 30.7% of the population.

As of the 2020 census, less than 0.1% of residents lived in urban areas, while 100.0% lived in rural areas.

As of the 2020 census, there were 965 households in the county, of which 19.0% had children under the age of 18 living in them. Of all households, 52.0% were married-couple households, 22.0% were households with a male householder and no spouse or partner present, and 22.3% were households with a female householder and no spouse or partner present. About 31.5% of all households were made up of individuals and 16.1% had someone living alone who was 65 years of age or older.

As of the 2020 census, there were 1,510 housing units, of which 36.1% were vacant. Among occupied housing units, 79.4% were owner-occupied and 20.6% were renter-occupied. The homeowner vacancy rate was 2.9% and the rental vacancy rate was 9.1%.

=== 2010 census ===
As of the 2010 United States census, 2,342 people were living in the county; 90.2% were White, 1.0% African American, 0.6% Native American, 0.3% Asian, 5.8% of some other race, and 2.0% of two or more races. About 33.7% were Hispanic or Latino (of any race).

=== 2000 census ===
As of the census of 2000, 2,207 people, 896 households, and 632 families were living in the county. The population density was less than 1/km^{2} (2.6/mi^{2}). The 1,420 housing units averaged less than 1/km^{2} (2.6/mi^{2}). The racial makeup of the county was 90.53% White, 0.91% African American, 0.32% Native American, 0.09% Asian, 5.17% from other races, and 2.99% from two or more races. About 35.48% of the population were Hispanic or Latino of any race.

Of the 896 households, 27.30% had children under the age of 18 living with them, 60.80% were married couples living together, 6.90% had a female householder with no husband present, and 29.40% were not families. About 26.30% of all households were made up of individuals, and 10.30% had someone living alone who was 65 older. The average household size was 2.39, and the average family size was 2.88.

In the county, the age distribution was 24.40% under 18, 5.30% from 18 to 24, 24.10% from 25 to 44, 30.00% from 45 to 64, and 16.30% who were 65 or older. The median age was 42 years. For every 100 females, there were 104.50 males. For every 100 females age 18 and over, there were 104.40 males.

The median income for a household in the county was $32,212, and for a family was $39,083. Males had a median income of $27,011 versus $21,384 for females. The per capita income for the county was $18,846. About 14.10% of families and 15.00% of the population were below the poverty line, including 17.10% of those under age 18 and 19.60% of those age 65 or over.

== Government ==
Map of Jeff Davis County, Texas with numbered voting precincts and colored commissioners court precincts

=== County offices ===
The Texas Constitution requires that Jeff Davis and all other Texas counties, regardless of area or population, be governed by an elected five-member commissioners court. It exercises power and jurisdiction over all county business. The court is composed of the county judge as presiding officer, and four county commissioners elected to four-year terms from single-member precincts.

The county judge under the state's constitution is elected to a four-year term and is designated as a conservator of the peace. The judge need not be an attorney, but is constitutionally required to be well informed in the law of the state. The judge serves as the budget officer for the commissioners court, and with the assistance of the county clerk, prepares the annual budget proposal. In addition to presiding over meetings of the Commissioners Court, the County Judge officiates the County Court. The County Judge has jurisdiction over misdemeanor offenses in which the fine may exceed $500 or in which confinement or imprisonment may be imposed.

The current Jeff Davis county judge is Curtis Evans, a Republican.

The state constitution calls for the election of justices of the peace and constables from individual precincts. Because Jeff Davis County has a population of fewer than 18,000 persons, it is permitted to have a single county-wide precinct for the election of these offices. The justice court in criminal cases has original jurisdiction in matters punishable by a fine only. In civil matters, the court has exclusive jurisdiction in all disputes involving $200 or less.

The constable executes and returns processes, warrants, and precepts as directed, including eviction notices, and is expressly authorized to perform acts and services including the serving civil or criminal processes, citations, notices, warrants, subpoenas, and writs, and may do so anywhere within the county. Additionally, the constable may serve civil processes in all contiguous counties. The constable is also expected to attend sessions of the justice court.

The sheriff is elected to a four-year term. Because the county has a population of fewer than 10,000, the sheriff also serves as the assessor-collector of taxes.

The county clerk holds a four-year elected term and serves as clerk to both commissioners court and county court, and acts as recorder for the county. Because Jeff Davis County has fewer than 8,000 residents, the county clerk also serves as the district clerk.

=== District offices ===
Jeff Davis County is within the 23rd congressional district; it is represented in the U.S. Congress by Rep. Tony Gonzales, a Republican.

The county is represented in the Texas Legislature by state Senator Cesar Blanco, a Democrat of the 29th senatorial district, and State Representative Eddie Morales, a Democrat of the 74th legislative district.

Martha M. Dominguez, a Democrat, represents the county from District 1 on the State Board of Education.

=== Politics ===
Sparsely populated and having a significant Latino minority, Jeff Davis leans conservative, and has joined the state in voting Republican after 1976.

United States presidential election results for Jeff Davis County, Texas
Year	Republican		Democratic		Third party(ies)	
Year	No.	%	No.	%	No.	%
1912	62	30.24%	129	62.93%	14	6.83%
1916	74	23.79%	234	75.24%	3	0.96%
1920	41	31.06%	91	68.94%	0	0.00%
1924	49	26.63%	117	63.59%	18	9.78%
1928	157	58.15%	112	41.48%	1	0.37%
1932	46	15.23%	252	83.44%	4	1.32%
1936	33	10.15%	291	89.54%	1	0.31%
1940	50	11.79%	374	88.21%	0	0.00%
1944	51	12.23%	331	79.38%	35	8.39%
1948	75	18.66%	309	76.87%	18	4.48%
1952	306	62.58%	183	37.42%	0	0.00%
1956	239	58.72%	165	40.54%	3	0.74%
1960	182	47.77%	195	51.18%	4	1.05%
1964	174	36.33%	304	63.47%	1	0.21%
1968	191	38.51%	239	48.19%	66	13.31%
1972	382	64.20%	202	33.95%	11	1.85%
1976	288	47.45%	309	50.91%	10	1.65%
1980	409	56.10%	300	41.15%	20	2.74%
1984	511	62.70%	299	36.69%	5	0.61%
1988	524	60.23%	325	37.36%	21	2.41%
1992	360	41.10%	321	36.64%	195	22.26%
1996	482	50.05%	370	38.42%	111	11.53%
2000	708	66.79%	283	26.70%	69	6.51%
2004	764	65.47%	378	32.39%	25	2.14%
2008	749	60.60%	468	37.86%	19	1.54%
2012	719	60.32%	440	36.91%	33	2.77%
2016	695	58.35%	422	35.43%	74	6.21%
2020	784	60.08%	501	38.39%	20	1.53%
2024	699	59.79%	450	38.49%	20	1.71%

United States Senate election results for Jeff Davis County, Texas1
Year	Republican		Democratic		Third party(ies)	
Year	No.	%	No.	%	No.	%
2024	671	58.10%	447	38.70%	37	3.20%

United States Senate election results for Jeff Davis County, Texas2
Year	Republican		Democratic		Third party(ies)	
Year	No.	%	No.	%	No.	%
2020	767	59.64%	483	37.56%	36	2.80%

Texas Gubernatorial election results for Jeff Davis County
Year	Republican		Democratic		Third party(ies)	
Year	No.	%	No.	%	No.	%
2022	641	61.05%	374	35.62%	35	3.33%

== Education ==
Map of Jeff Davis County, Texas with school district boundaries

Western Jeff Davis County is served by the Valentine Independent School District, while central and eastern Jeff Davis County are served by the Fort Davis Independent School District.

All of Jeff Davis County is zoned to Odessa College.

== Communities ==
- Valentine
- Fort Davis (county seat)

== In popular culture ==
The Mountain Goats recorded a song called "Jeff Davis County Blues" on the 2002 album All Hail West Texas.

== See also ==
- List of museums in West Texas
- National Register of Historic Places listings in Jeff Davis County, Texas
- Recorded Texas Historic Landmarks in Jeff Davis County
