= Fort Davis, Texas =

Town in Jeff Davis County

- Census-designated place
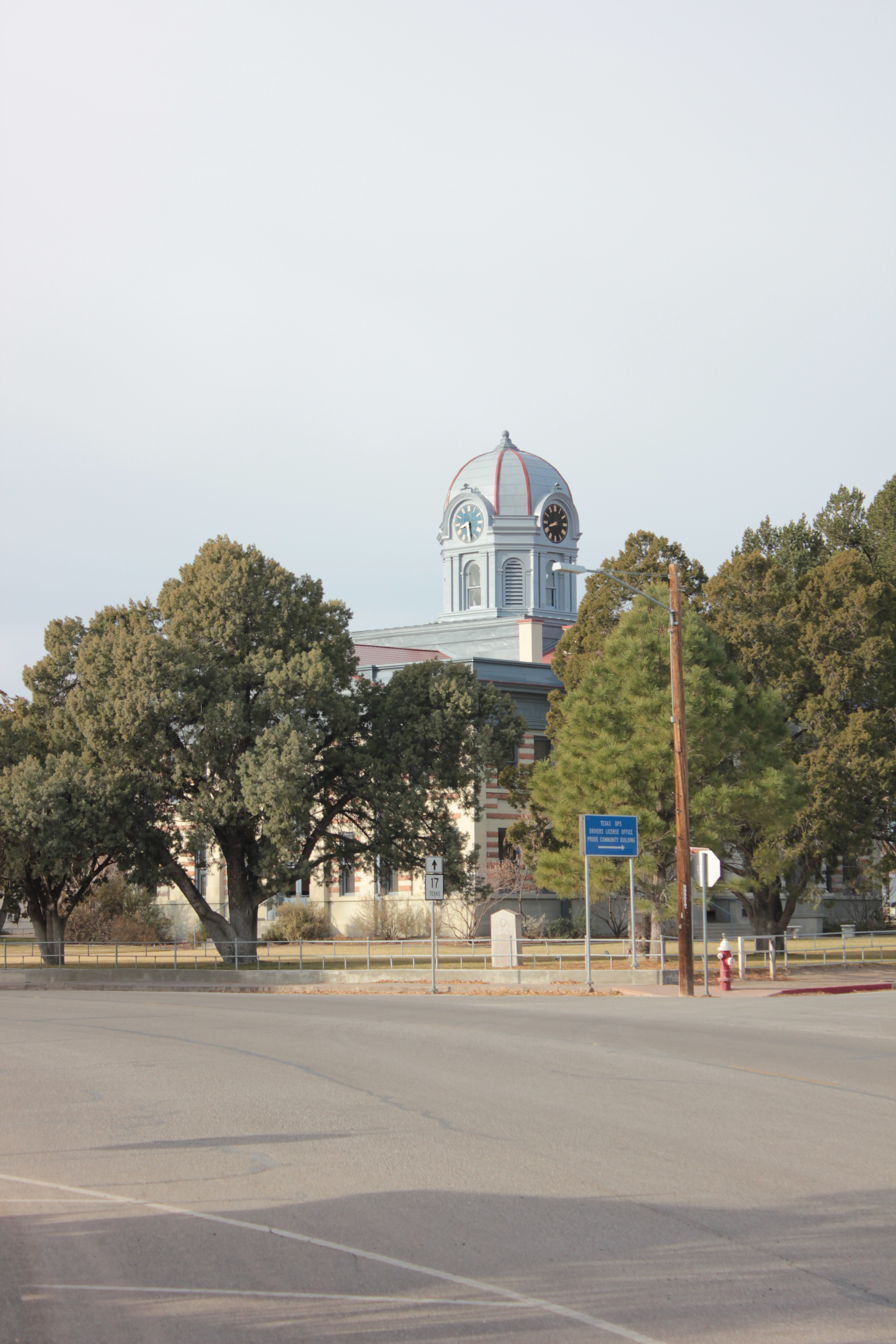
- Jeff Davis County Courthouse, located in Fort Davis

- Location of Fort Davis, Texas
- Coordinates: 30°35′48″N 103°52′51″W
- Country: United States
- State: Texas
- County: Jeff Davis

Area
  - Total: 10.1 sq mi (26.1 km^{2})
  - Land: 10.1 sq mi (26.1 km^{2})
  - Water: 0 sq mi (0.0 km^{2})
- Elevation: 4,961 ft (1,512 m)

Population (2020)
  - Total: 1,024
  - Density: 102/sq mi (39.2/km^{2})
- Time zone: UTC-6 (Central (CST))
  - Summer (DST): UTC-5 (CDT)
- ZIP code: 79734
- Area code: 432
- FIPS code: 48-26688
- GNIS feature ID: 2408235

Fort Davis is an unincorporated community and census-designated place (CDP) in Jeff Davis County, Texas, United States. Its population was 1,024 at the 2020 census, down from 1,201 at the 2010 census. It is the county seat of Jeff Davis County.

== History ==
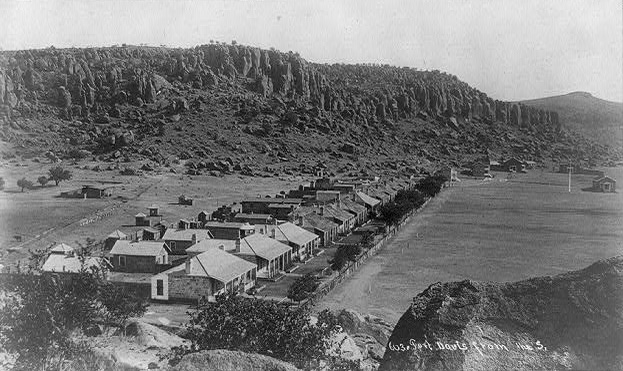
Fort Davis in 1885

It was the site of Fort Davis, established in 1854 on the San Antonio–El Paso Road through West Texas and named after Jefferson Davis, who was then the secretary of war under President Franklin Pierce. It was re-established in 1867 following the civil war.

== Geography ==
Fort Davis is located in southeastern Jeff Davis County at the southeastern foot of the Davis Mountains. Texas State Highway 17 (State Street) passes through the center of town, leading northeast 38 miles (61 km) to Interstate 10 at Balmorhea and southwest 21 miles (34 km) to Marfa. Texas State Highway 118 joins Highway 17 through the center of Fort Davis, but leads northwest through the Davis Mountains 52 miles (84 km) to Interstate 10 and southeast 23 miles (37 km) to Alpine.

According to the United States Census Bureau, the CDP has a total area of 10.1 square miles (26.1 km^{2}), all land.

Fort Davis has the highest elevation above sea level of any county seat in Texas at 4,900 feet (1,500 m).

=== Climate ===
Fort Davis experiences a semiarid climate (Köppen BSk) with cool, dry winters and hot, wet summers. The large degree of diurnal temperature variation is due to the high elevation of the area.

Climate data for Fort Davis, Texas, 1991–2020 normals, extremes 1902–present
Month	Jan	Feb	Mar	Apr	May	Jun	Jul	Aug	Sep	Oct	Nov	Dec	Year
Record high °F (°C)	81 (27)	86 (30)	90 (32)	97 (36)	102 (39)	107 (42)	103 (39)	104 (40)	101 (38)	100 (38)	95 (35)	80 (27)	107 (42)
Mean maximum °F (°C)	74.4 (23.6)	78.0 (25.6)	84.2 (29.0)	88.9 (31.6)	95.6 (35.3)	99.7 (37.6)	97.5 (36.4)	95.8 (35.4)	92.9 (33.8)	88.8 (31.6)	80.5 (26.9)	74.6 (23.7)	100.8 (38.2)
Mean daily maximum °F (°C)	61.8 (16.6)	66.5 (19.2)	72.6 (22.6)	80.2 (26.8)	86.9 (30.5)	91.8 (33.2)	90.0 (32.2)	88.8 (31.6)	84.4 (29.1)	79.3 (26.3)	69.2 (20.7)	62.3 (16.8)	77.8 (25.5)
Daily mean °F (°C)	46.3 (7.9)	50.4 (10.2)	56.3 (13.5)	63.4 (17.4)	71.0 (21.7)	77.6 (25.3)	77.2 (25.1)	75.9 (24.4)	71.0 (21.7)	63.6 (17.6)	53.5 (11.9)	47.2 (8.4)	62.8 (17.1)
Mean daily minimum °F (°C)	30.8 (−0.7)	34.4 (1.3)	39.9 (4.4)	46.6 (8.1)	55.1 (12.8)	63.4 (17.4)	64.4 (18.0)	63.1 (17.3)	57.6 (14.2)	47.9 (8.8)	37.7 (3.2)	32.1 (0.1)	47.8 (8.7)
Mean minimum °F (°C)	14.7 (−9.6)	16.5 (−8.6)	22.2 (−5.4)	29.7 (−1.3)	39.9 (4.4)	51.9 (11.1)	56.0 (13.3)	54.1 (12.3)	44.3 (6.8)	29.6 (−1.3)	20.1 (−6.6)	14.1 (−9.9)	11.0 (−11.7)
Record low °F (°C)	2 (−17)	0 (−18)	10 (−12)	20 (−7)	26 (−3)	40 (4)	47 (8)	46 (8)	36 (2)	18 (−8)	8 (−13)	0 (−18)	0 (−18)
Average precipitation inches (mm)	0.53 (13)	0.41 (10)	0.40 (10)	0.54 (14)	1.19 (30)	2.28 (58)	2.99 (76)	2.65 (67)	2.08 (53)	1.28 (33)	0.57 (14)	0.59 (15)	15.51 (393)
Average snowfall inches (cm)	0.8 (2.0)	0.5 (1.3)	0.0 (0.0)	0.0 (0.0)	0.0 (0.0)	0.0 (0.0)	0.0 (0.0)	0.0 (0.0)	0.0 (0.0)	0.1 (0.25)	0.4 (1.0)	0.7 (1.8)	2.5 (6.35)
Average precipitation days (≥ 0.01 in)	3.1	2.4	2.5	2.3	5.1	8.1	10.9	9.7	8.4	5.0	2.8	3.4	63.7
Average snowy days (≥ 0.1 in)	0.4	0.2	0.0	0.0	0.0	0.0	0.0	0.0	0.0	0.1	0.2	0.4	1.3
Source 1: NOAA
Source 2: National Weather Service

== Demographics ==
Historical population
Census	Pop.	Note	%±
2000	1,050		—
2010	1,201		14.4%
2020	1,024		−14.7%
U.S. Decennial Census; 1850–1900 1910; 1920 1930 1940; 1950 1960 1970; 1980 1990 2000; 2010

Fort Davis first appeared as a census designated place in the 2000 U.S. census.

=== 2020 census ===
Fort Davis CDP, Texas – Racial and ethnic composition Note: the US Census treats Hispanic/Latino as an ethnic category. This table excludes Latinos from the racial categories and assigns them to a separate category. Hispanics/Latinos may be of any race.
Race / Ethnicity (NH = Non-Hispanic)	Pop 2000	Pop 2010	Pop 2020	% 2000	% 2010	% 2020
White alone (NH)	513	605	547	48.86%	50.37%	53.42%
Black or African American alone (NH)	0	2	0	0.00%	0.17%	0.00%
Native American or Alaska Native alone (NH)	5	4	4	0.48%	0.33%	0.39%
Asian alone (NH)	0	0	5	0.00%	0.00%	0.49%
Native Hawaiian or Pacific Islander alone (NH)	0	0	0	0.00%	0.00%	0.00%
Other race alone (NH)	1	1	6	0.10%	0.08%	0.59%
Multiracial (NH)	13	14	24	1.24%	1.17%	2.34%
Hispanic or Latino (any race)	518	575	438	49.33%	47.88%	42.77%
Total	1,050	1,201	1,024	100.00%	100.00%	100.00%

As of the 2020 United States census, there were 1,024 people, 415 households, and 317 families residing in the CDP.

=== 2000 census ===
As of the census of 2000, 1,050 people, 415 households, and 298 families resided in the CDP. The population density was 188.2 inhabitants per square mile (72.7/km^{2}). The 525 housing units averaged 94.1 per square mile (36.3/km^{2}). The racial makeup of the CDP was 88.29% White, 0.19% African American, 0.48% Native American, 7.62% from other races, and 3.43% from two or more races. Hispanics or Latinos of any race were 49.33% of the population.

Of the 415 households, 32.0% had children under 18 living with them, 57.6% were married couples living together, 10.6% had a female householder with no husband present, and 28.0% were not families. About 24.3% of all households were made up of individuals, and 9.9% had someone living alone who was 65or older. The average household size was 2.53 and the average family size was 3.02.

In the CDP, the age distribution was 24.7% under 18, 7.4% from 18 to 24, 26.9% from 25 to 44, 25.4% from 45 to 64, and 15.6% who were 65 or older. The median age was 39 years. For every 100 females, there were 102.3 males. For every 100 females 18 and over, there were 97.3 males.

The median income in the CDP for a household was $25,882 and for a family was $27,955. Males had a median income of $22,500 versus $20,000 for females. The per capita income for the CDP was $14,249. About 20.7% of families and 21.6% of the population were below the poverty line, including 26.3% of those under 18 and 26.0% of those 65 or over.

== Arts and culture ==
=== Points of interest ===
- Chihuahuan Desert Nature Center and Botanical Gardens at the Chihuahuan Desert Research Institute
- Fort Davis National Historic Site
- The McDonald Observatory of the University of Texas
- Fort Davis is home to one of 10 dishes comprising the Very Long Baseline Array.
- Davis Mountains State Park

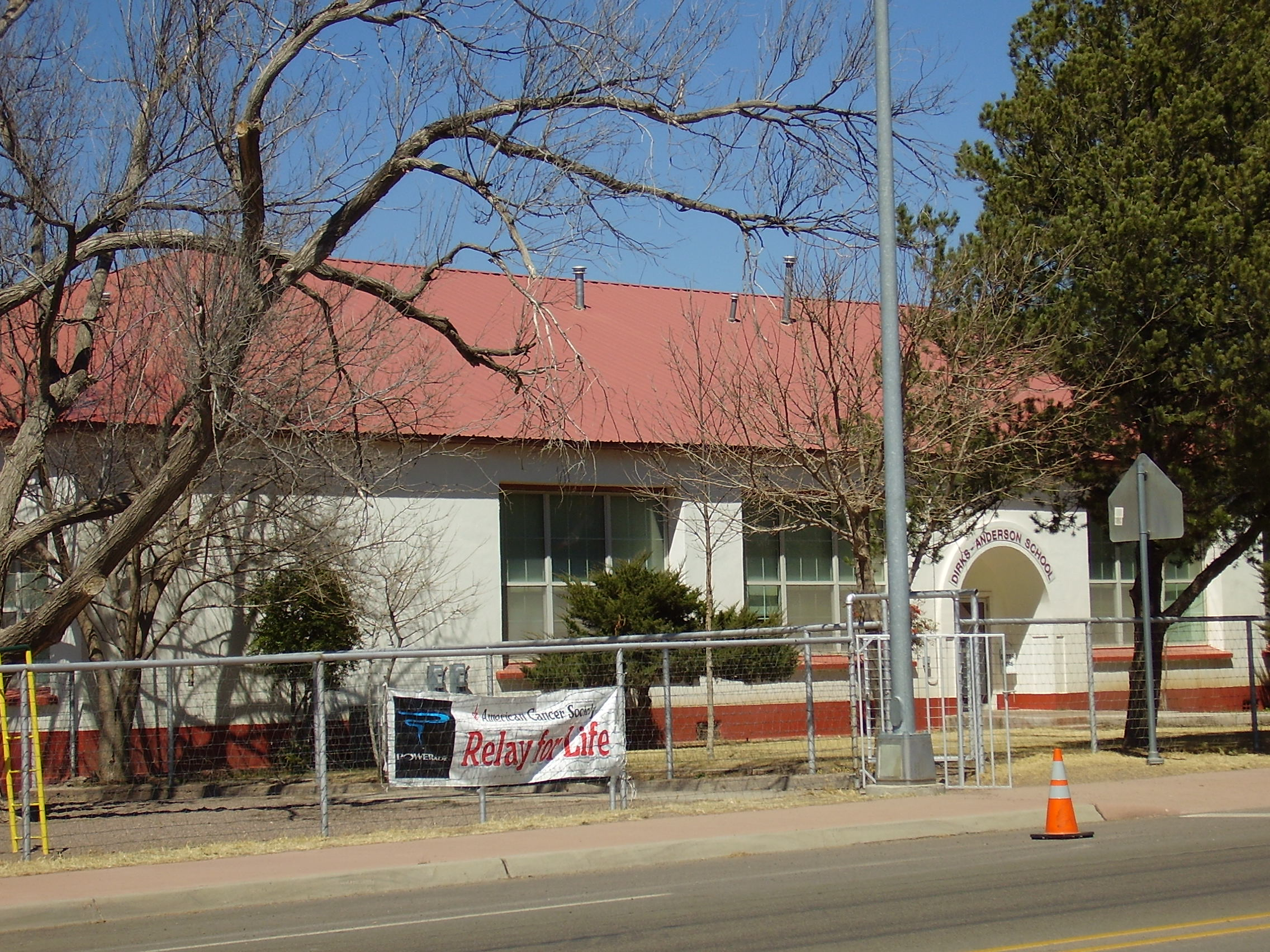
Dirks-Anderson Elementary School

Fort Davis is served by the Fort Davis Independent School District.

== Education ==
- Dirks-Anderson Elementary School
- Fort Davis High School

All of Jeff Davis County is zoned to Odessa College.

== Gallery ==
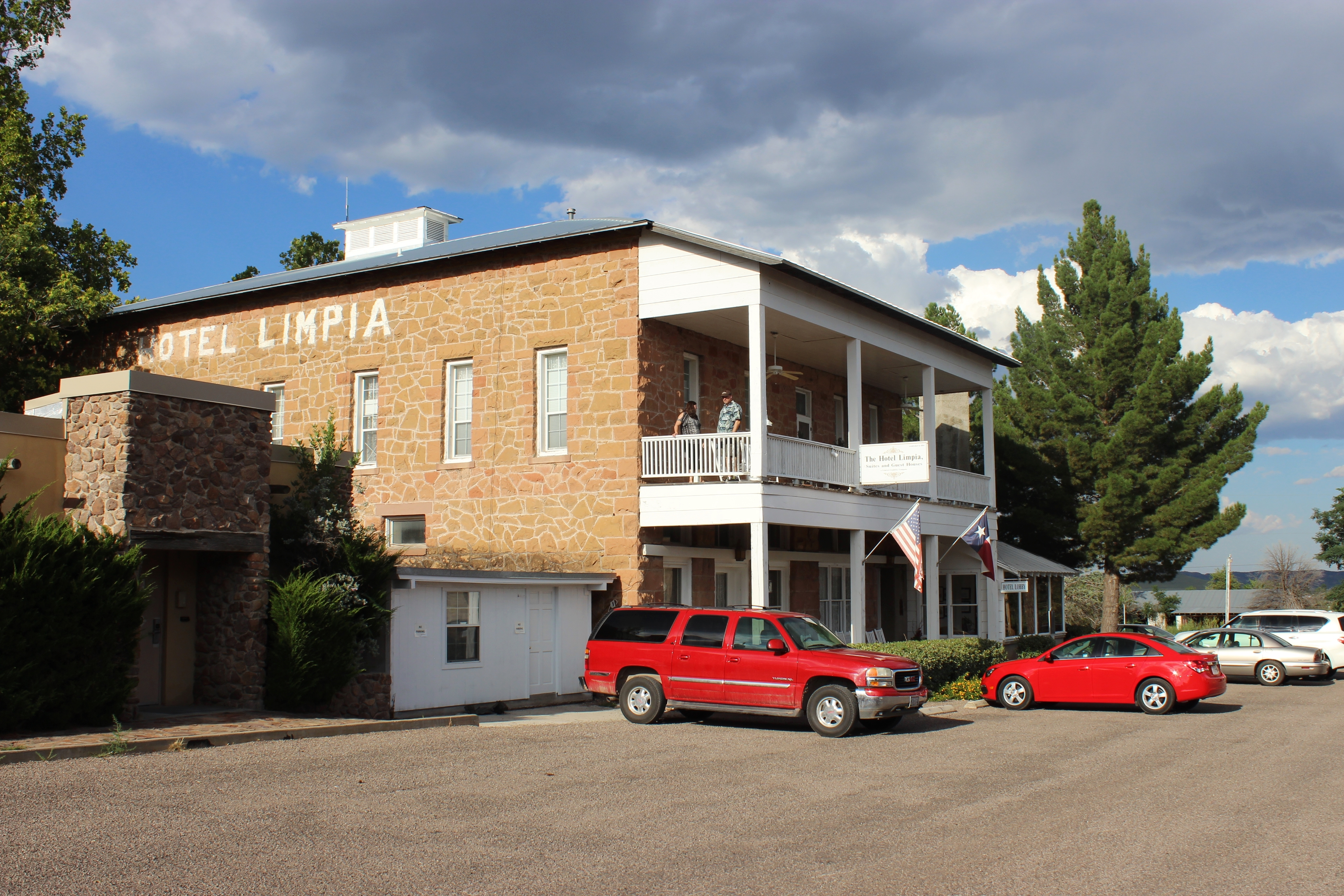
Hotel Limpia (circa 1912)

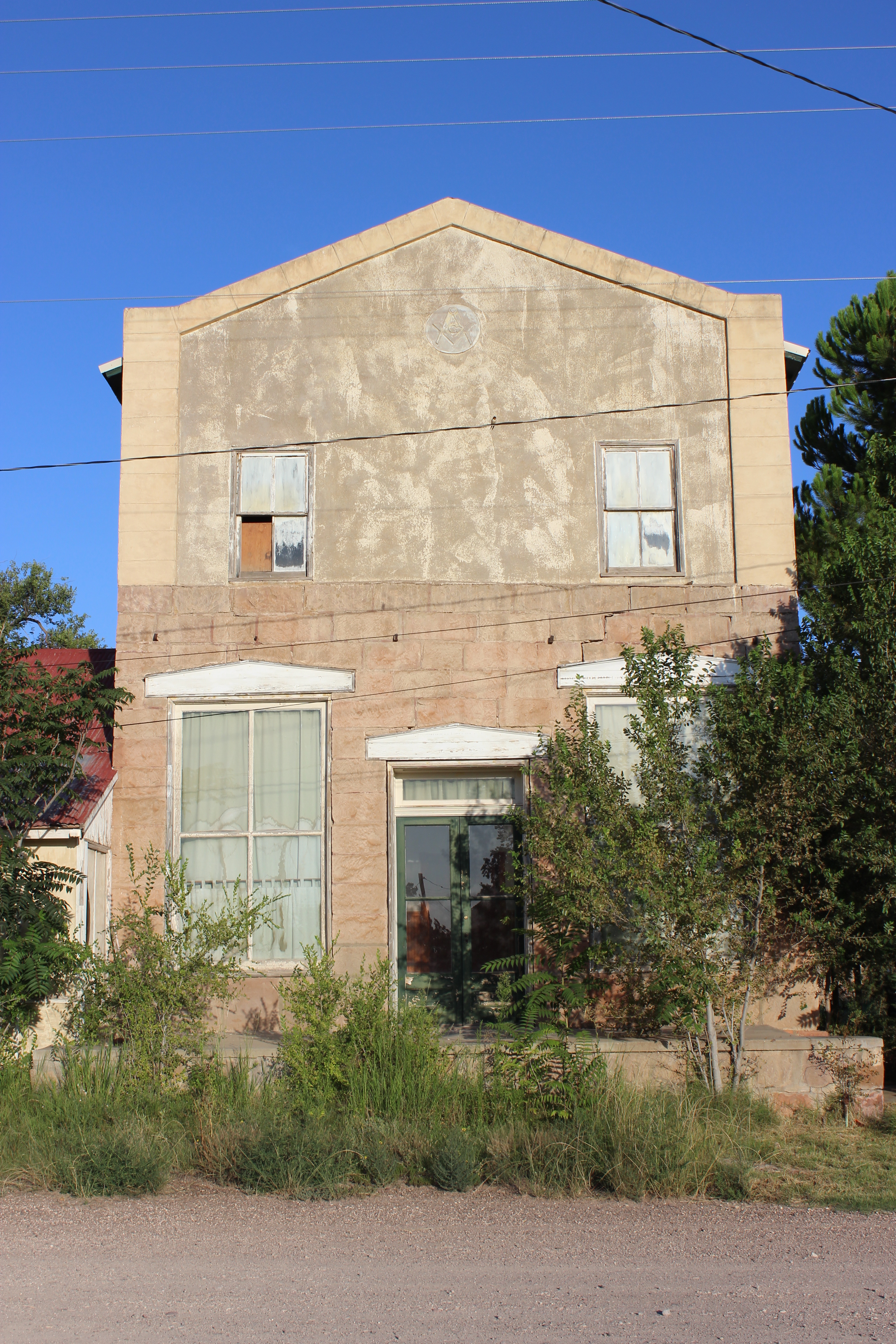
Masonic Lodge
