= Zafar Mahal =

Zafar Mahal may refer to:

- Zafar Mahal (Mehrauli), a summer palace built during the fading years of the Mughal era in Delhi
- Zafar Mahal in the Hayat Bakhsh Bagh (Red Fort), a garden in the Red Fort in Delhi
