= Hira Mahal (Red Fort) =

Coordinates: 28.657259°N 77.243726°E

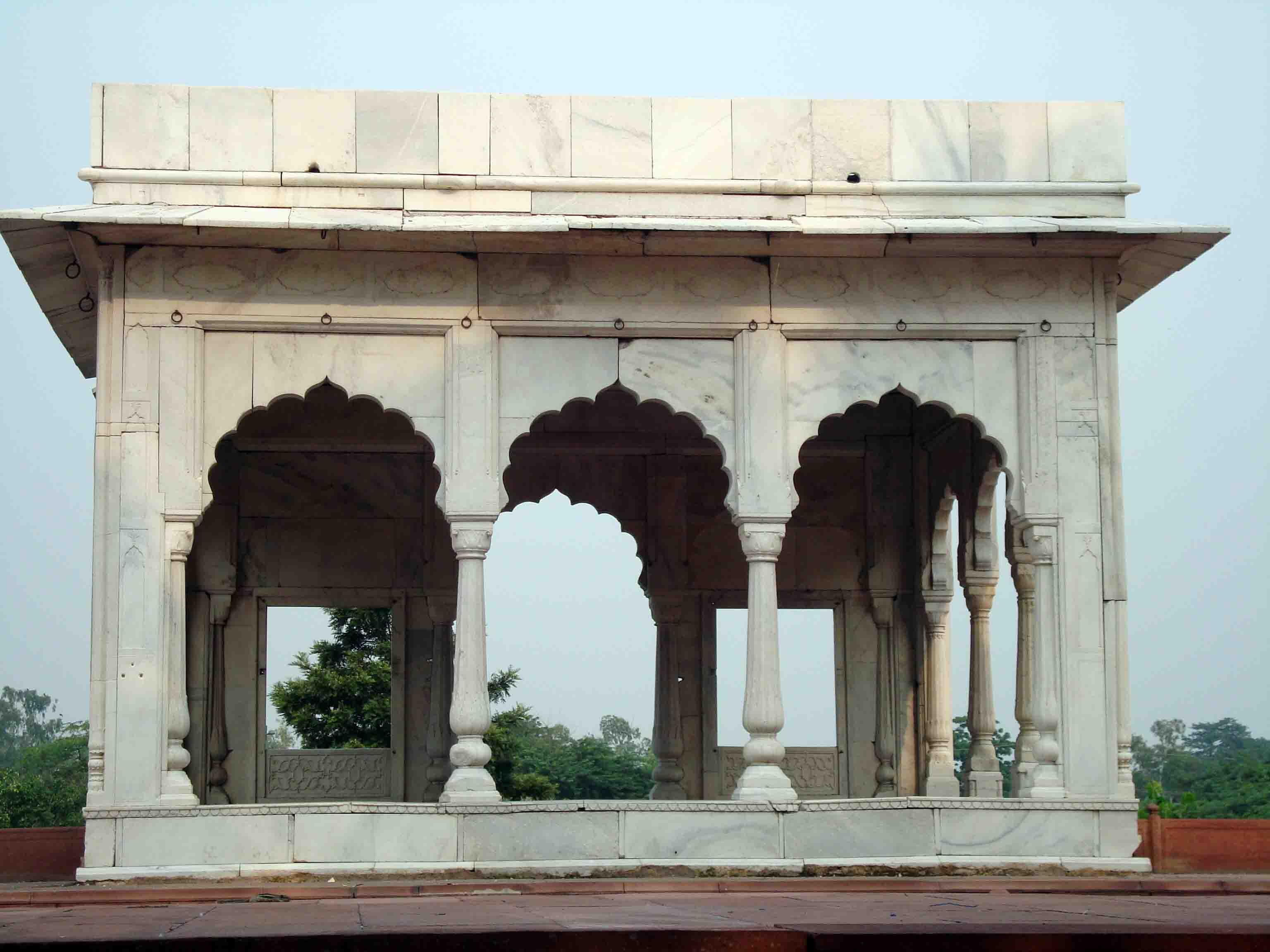
The Hira Mahal of Red Fort

The Hira Mahal is a pavilion in the Red Fort in Old Delhi located on the eastern wall north of the Moti Masjid. It originally stood as one of two symmetrical pavilions, its twin Moti Mahal at the northern end having been destroyed during the rebellion of 1857 and overlooks the garden along a formal central axis. The pavilion’s simple decoration consists of carved relief arches and overhanging chhajjas, with no inlay work, reflecting the late Mughal taste for restrained elegance. After decades of neglect, the structure underwent a comprehensive restoration by the Archaeological Survey of India completed in 2019, which cleared vegetation, stabilized its marble fabric, and cleaned its original carvings.

== History ==
Hira Mahal was commissioned in 1842 by Bahadur Shah II as one of two white‑marble pavilions flanking the southern end of the Hayat Bakhsh Bagh within the Red Fort,Old Delhi. Its twin pavilion, Moti Mahal, was lost during or soon after the rebellion of 1857, and Hira Mahal subsequently fell into neglect under British military occupation. Mid‑20th‑century Archaeological Survey of India (ASI) efforts cleared vegetation and stabilized its marble structure, but it was only during a comprehensive restoration completed in 2019 that the pavilion’s relief‑carved arches, overhanging chhajjas and marble surfaces received scientific treatment and cleaning to reveal their original Mughal‑era craftsmanship.

== Architecture ==
This four-sided pavilion of white marble was built in 1842, during the reign of Bahadur Shah II. It stands at the end of a southern axis of the Hayat Baksh Bagh, overlooking it. It is simply decorated, with reliefs but no inlay work. The arches are carved and the pavilion is overhung with chhajja, overhanging eave. Located to the north end was the Moti Mahal, which was an identical structure built at the same time for the northern axis. It was probably destroyed during or after the Indian Rebellion of 1857. In between these two pavilions was a pool or another structure.
