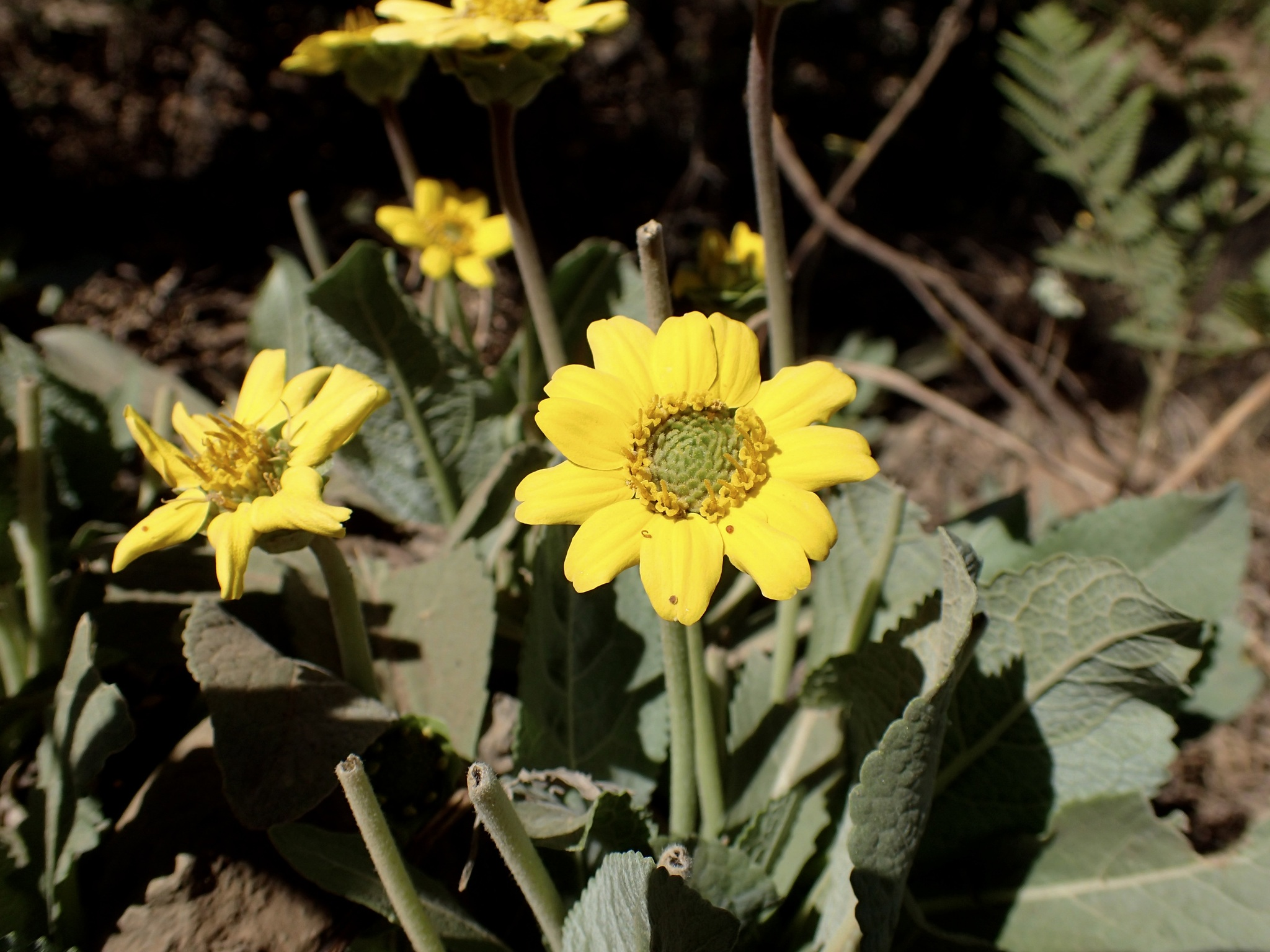

Scientific classification
- Kingdom: Plantae
- Clade: Tracheophytes
- Clade: Angiosperms
- Clade: Eudicots
- Clade: Asterids
- Order: Asterales
- Family: Asteraceae
- Genus: Berlandiera
- Species: B. monocephala

Binomial name
- Berlandiera monocephala (B.L.Turner) Pinkava

Synonyms
- Berlandiera lyrata var. monocephala B.L.Turner

= Berlandiera monocephala =

Species of flowering plant

Berlandiera monocephala is a North American species of flowering plant in the family Asteraceae. It is native to the southwestern United States and northern Mexico, in the states of Arizona, New Mexico, Chihuahua, and Sonora. Most of the Mexican populations are found in the Sierra Madre Occidental along the Chihuahua/Sonora line.

Berlandiera monocephala is an herb up to 100 cm (40 inches) tall. It has flower heads borne one at a time, each with yellow ray florets and yellow disc florets. The species is found in pine-oak forests in the mountains.
