= CDRI =

CDRI could be:

- Central Drug Research Institute
- Chihuahuan Desert Research Institute
- Coalition for Disaster Resilient Infrastructure
