= Moon garden =

Garden for enjoyment at night

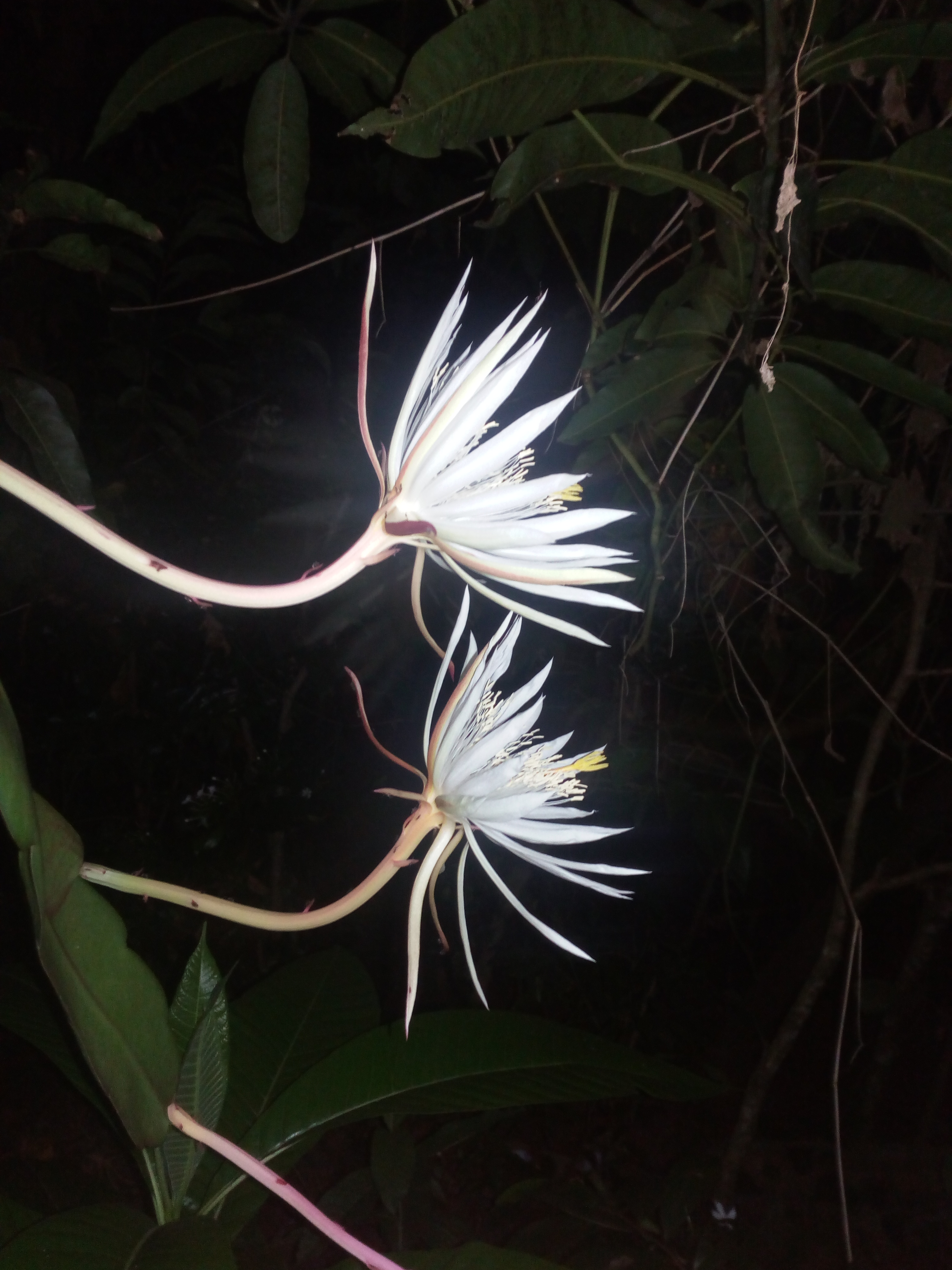
Night-blooming flowers (cereus)

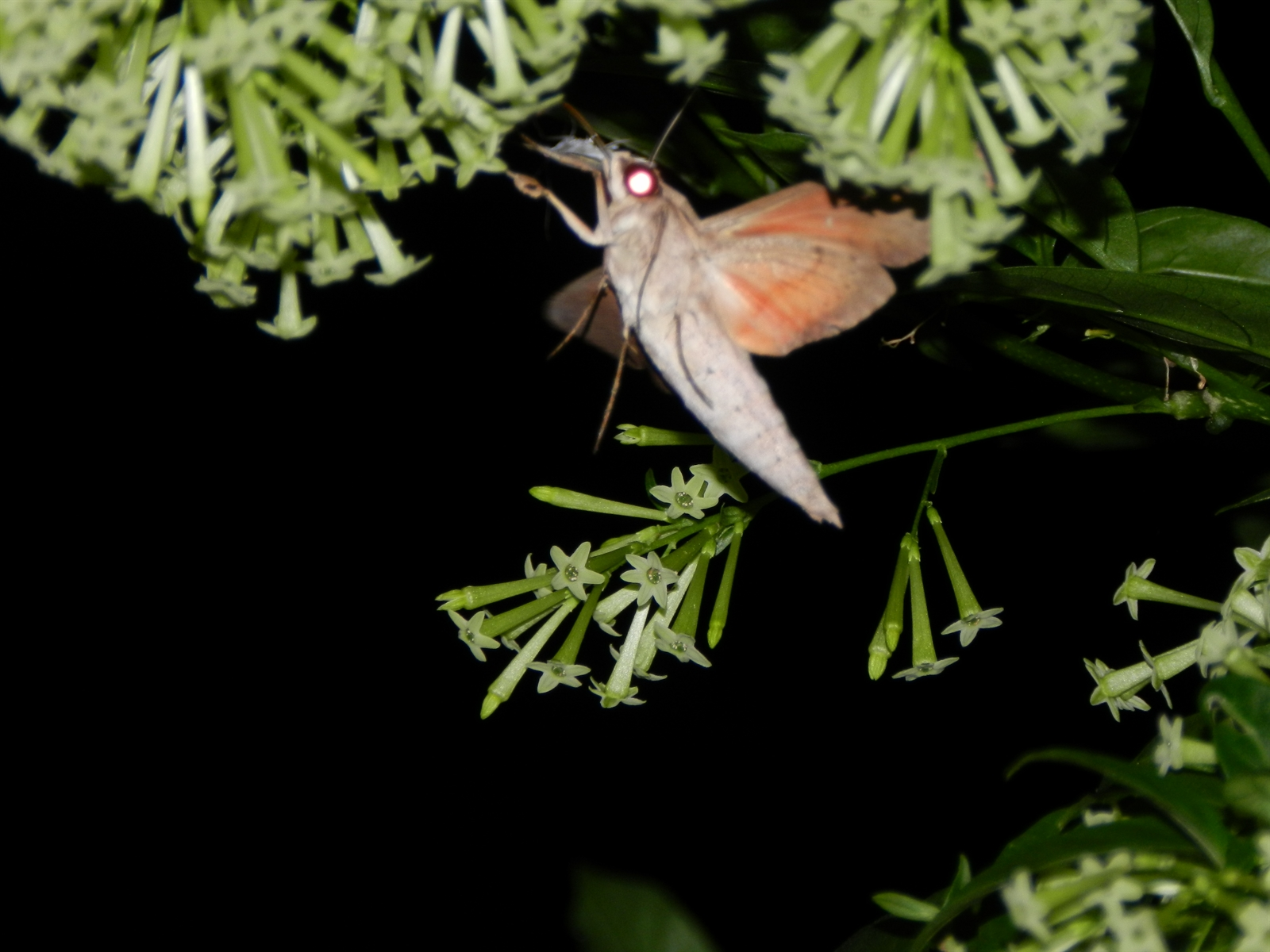
Night-blooming jessamine being pollinated by a moth at night

A moon garden, also known as a twilight garden, evening garden, night garden, moonlight garden, or dream garden, is a type of garden designed to be enjoyed at dusk and nighttime. Fragrant flowers, light-colored vegetation or blooms that are visible by moonlight, blossoms that open at night instead of day, and plants which attract night pollinators you can hear, are all elements of a moon garden. The different effects produced by moonlight compared to sunlight in human color perception emphasize the colors of certain flowers more than others, bringing out different tones which are not available during daytime or with artificial lights. Night-blooming plants are typically moth, bat or wind pollinated. Planning an evening garden can perform double-duty as a setting for evening entertaining such as barbecues and parties.

In India, the Mehtab Bagh, meaning 'moonlight garden', was built around 1530 by Emperor Babur and later became part of the Taj Mahal complex. It featured night-blooming plants, white plastered walkways, an octagonal reflecting pool, and a pavilion.

"Moonlight gardens were a tradition enjoyed by Indians before the Mughals; after sheltering from the day's heat, they took their ease amid fragrant white blossoms and flowering trees in the cooler night air. The Mughals added pools and water devices to their moonlight gardens and outlined the raised paths, platforms, and pavilions with small oil lamps."

== Design elements ==
A firefly at night

White reflects better than darker colors, therefore choosing plants with white blooms work well for a moon garden. Paler blues and purples may also show in the gloom. Silvery foliage, such as those you would find in Mediterranean or arid climates, reflects in low light levels. A moon garden is not just about sight, but about all the senses. Strong scents, the feeling of a breeze, or sound of movement will enhance the experience of a garden during the evening or night. Nighttime pollinators, such as moths and bats, are attracted to blooms open at night, strong scents and reflectiveness, and may be visible or audible in the garden. The moon garden's attraction to moths is said to be the night version of a butterfly garden. Water elements might include a small trickling fountain to create soft sounds or reflect light with movement. A moon-gazing pond or birdbath of still water can reflect the Moon—the nighttime equivalent of a reflecting pool.

Low levels of landscape lighting can be appropriate, such as fairy lights for mood lighting, or solar LED lights to illuminate walkways. Electric lighting can create special effects using techniques such as uplighting and silhouetting. Striking features in daylight might disappear at night; they can be lit for nighttime focal points, or a new focal point can be chosen and illuminated. Fireflies are attracted to darker gardens.

== Plants suited for moon gardens ==
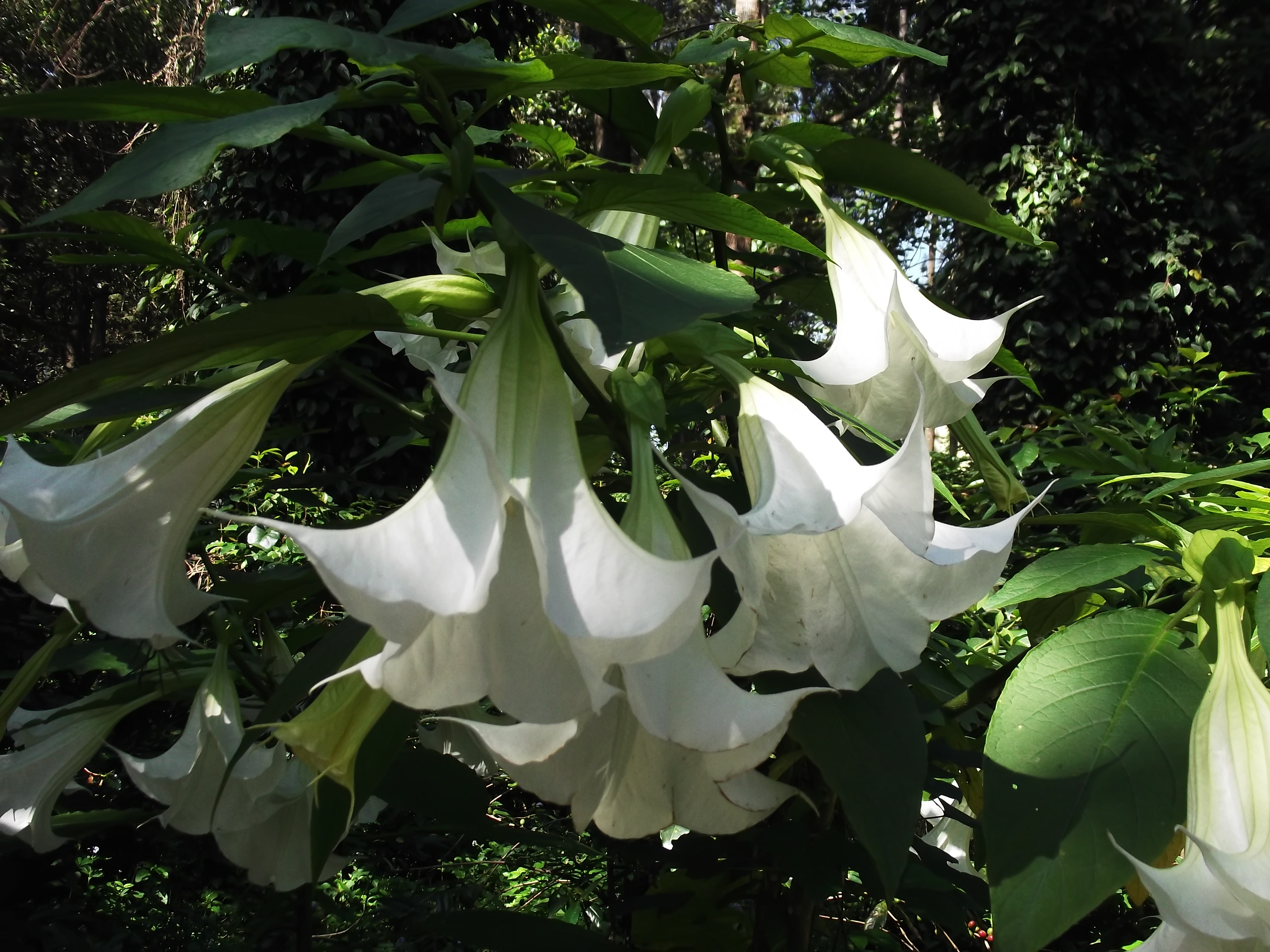
Angel's trumpet

Certain flowers and plants with specific colors and nocturnal habits are suited to moon gardens. Among these, lilies, angel's trumpet, sweet rocket, moonflower, four o'clock flower, bearded iris, night gladiolus, evening primrose, magnolia, snowdrop, foxglove, Japanese dogwood, garden phlox, lamb's ear, silvermound, peonies, and common lilac are all commonly cultivated plants in moon gardens.

White flowers are especially suited to moon gardens, but green, pink, and other pale colors are also common. Silver, white, or variegated leaves will work as well.

The wan colors of Moonbeams bloom in Moon gardens planted with lilies, angel's trumpet, sweet rocket, and the like, all of them white or nearly so, or prized for their nocturnal habits. The giant Moon flower, evening's answer to the morning glory, opens its white petals at day's end, as do its companions the four-o'clocks, the vesper iris, and the night gladiolus. Evening primrose also finds welcome in Moon gardens, despite pink blossoms, because the primrose wafts its perfume after dark.

— Dava Sobel, The Planets

== Night bloomers ==
Some of the night-blooming plants have names indicating this behavior, such as four o'clocks, evening primrose, night phlox, and moonflower. Other night-blooming flowers include foamflower, tuberose, night-blooming cereus, night-blooming lotus, night gladiolus, Nottingham catchfly, and chocolate daisy. The citron daylily, unlike most day lilies, opens in midafternoon and stays open through the night.

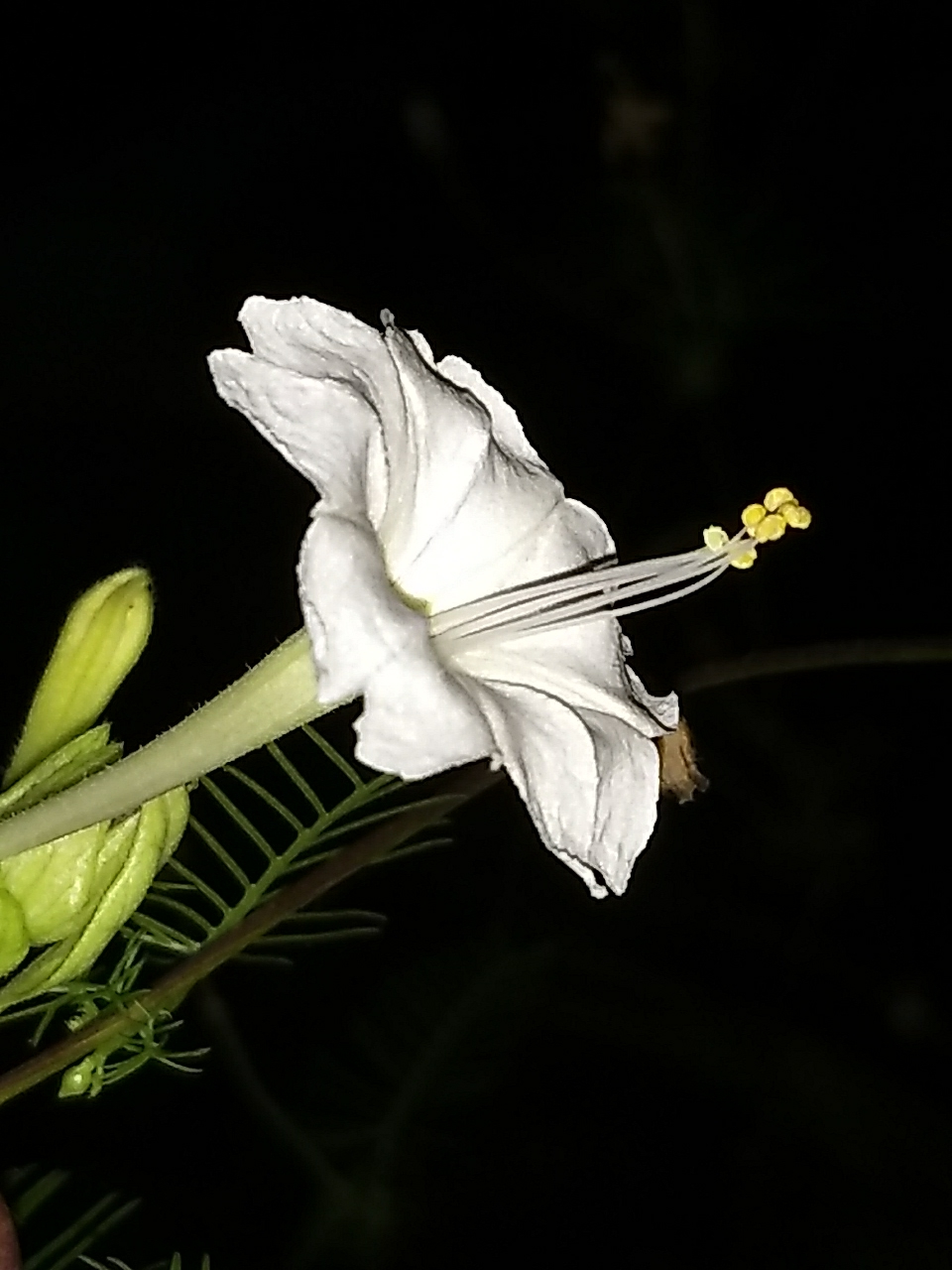
Four o'clocks

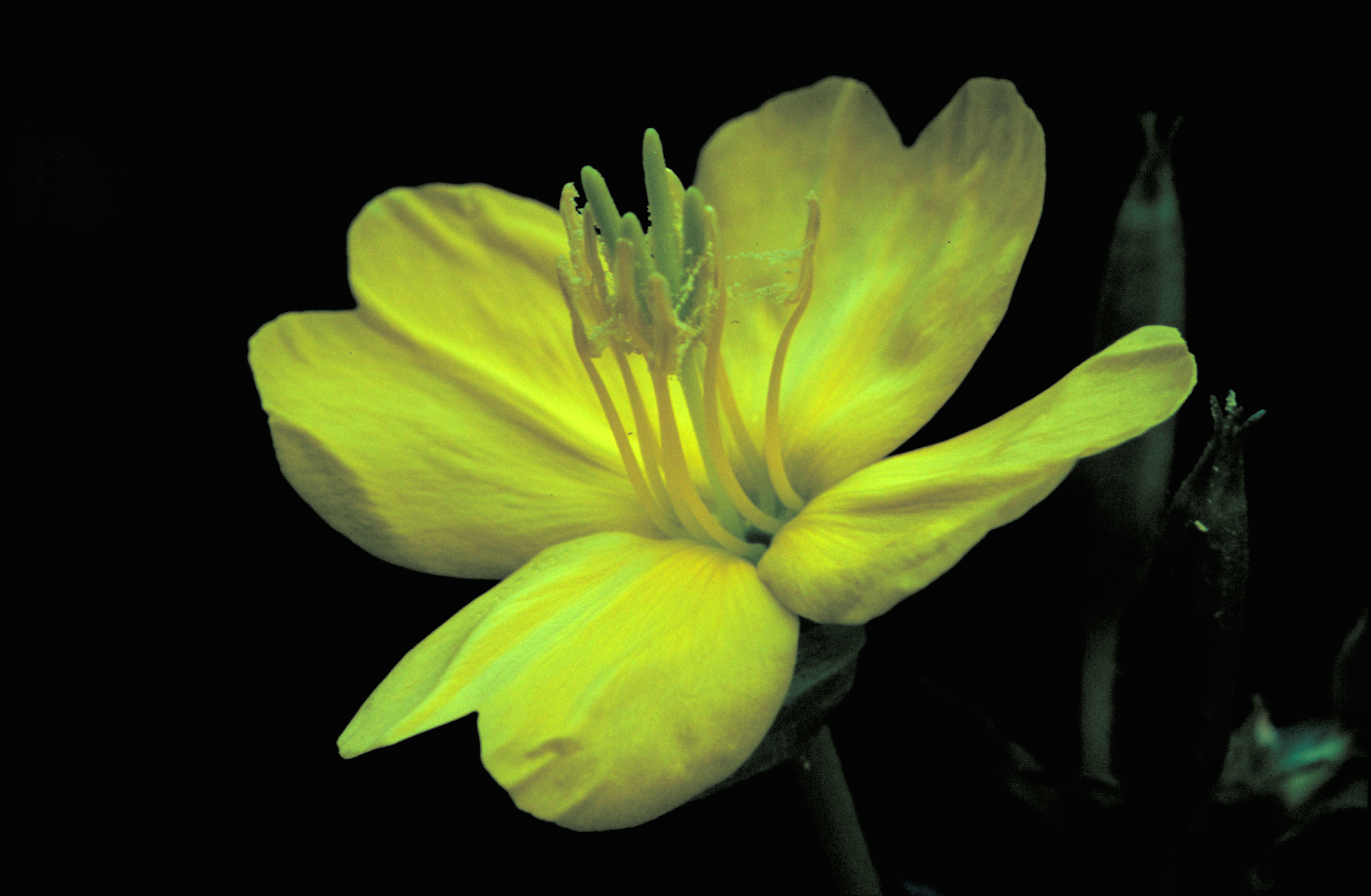
Evening primrose

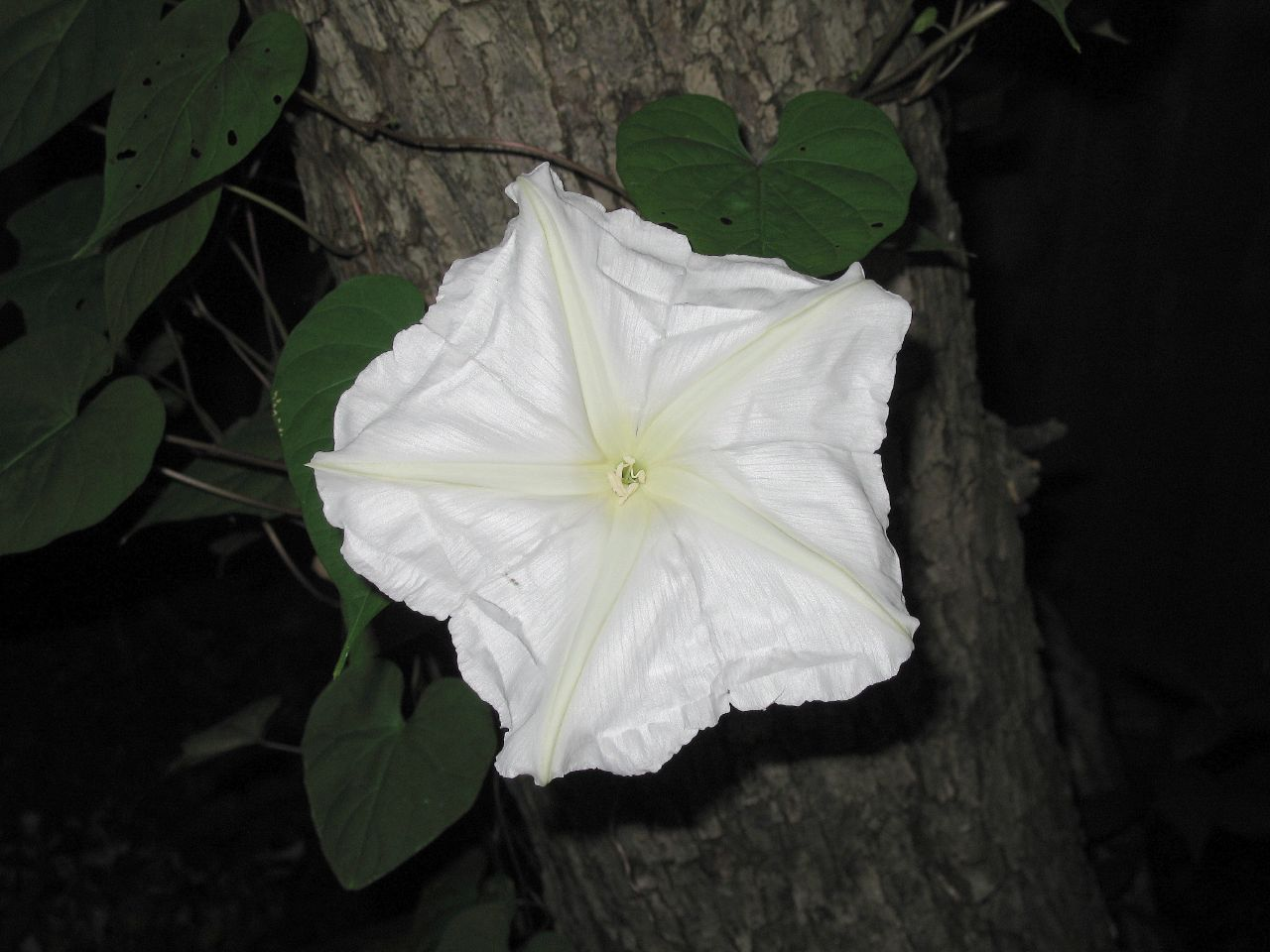
Moonflower

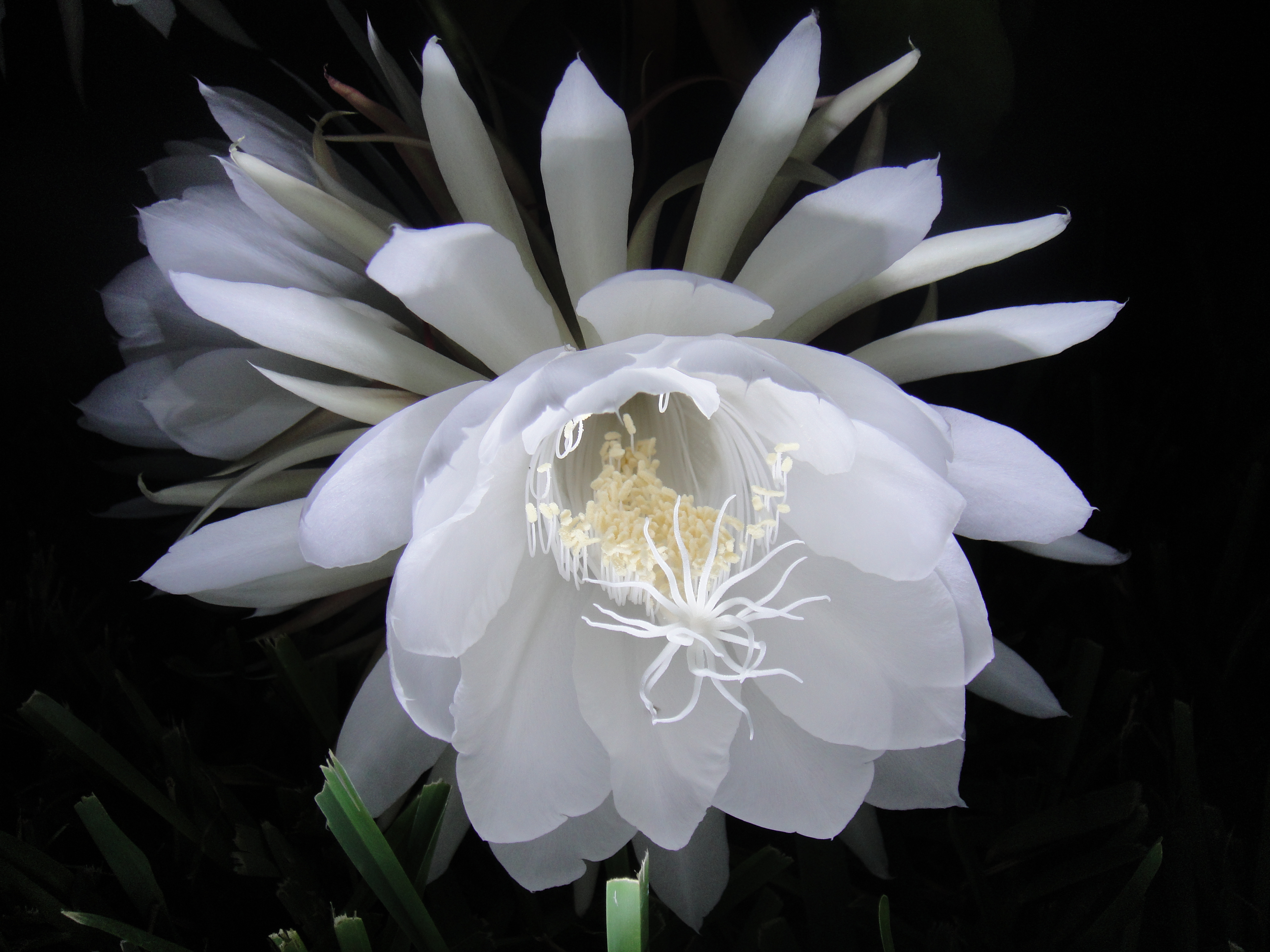
Night-blooming cereus

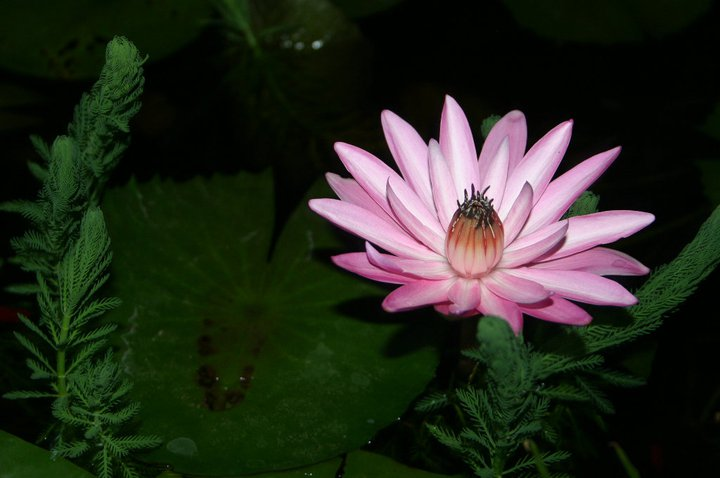
Night-blooming lotus

== Night scents ==
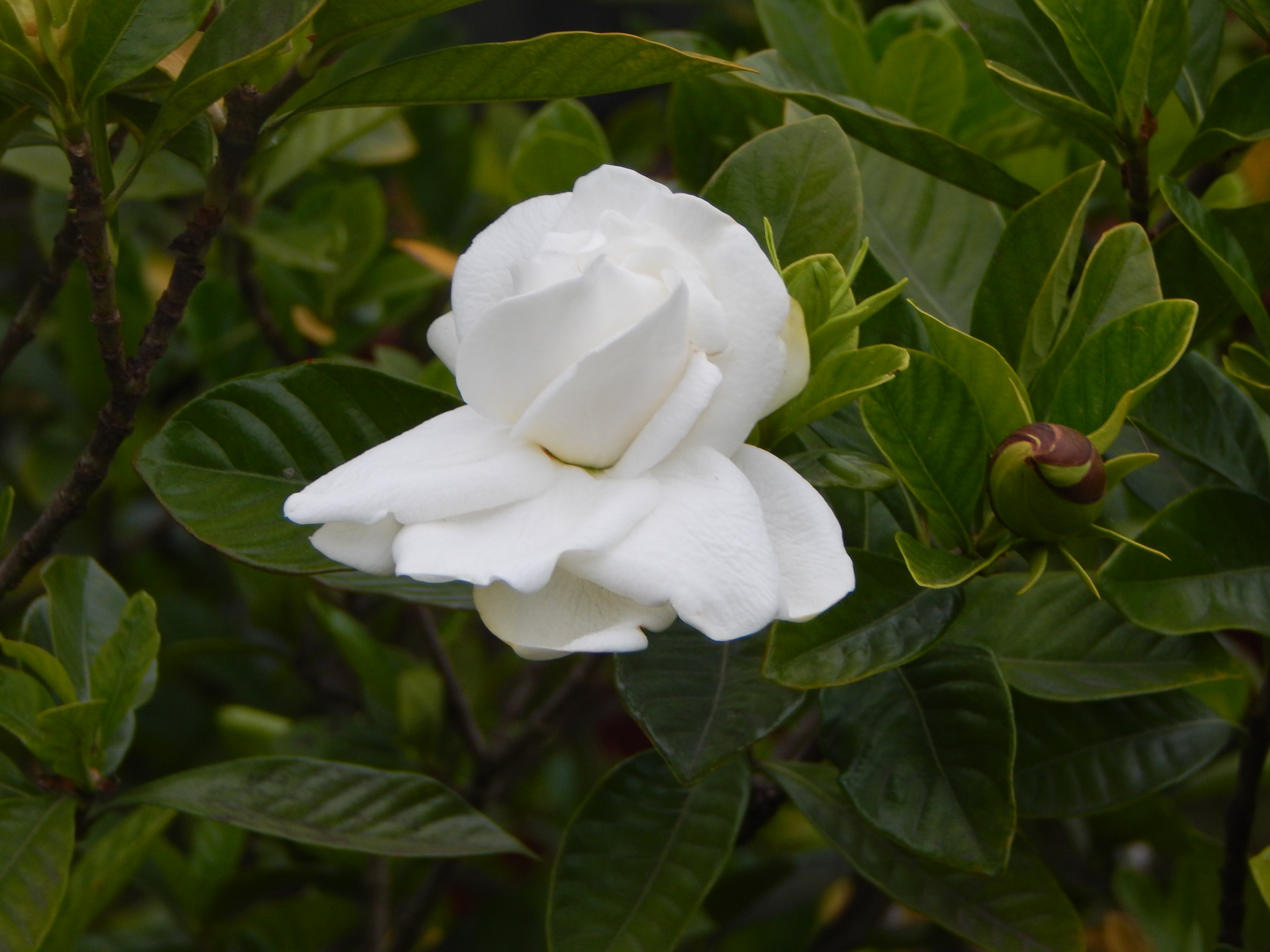
Gardenia

While daytime pollinators use vision to locate their sources of nectar, night pollinators such as moths and bats have poor vision and operate in low light levels. Therefore they are attracted to strongly scented blossoms.

In response to changing light levels, plants such as Night-scented stock (Matthiola longipetala) pump cells to open blooms as night falls, and close up again when daylight returns. Gardenias (Gardenia jasminoides) put out stronger scents at night, and night-blooming jessamine (Cestrum nocturnum) has such a strong scent it is recommended to plant it a bit away from the house.

== Silver foliage ==
Silver-leafed plants are good reflectors and contrast for low light levels, such as silver ragwort (Senecio cineraria), Texas sage (Leucophyllum frutescens), and several plants in the Artemisia family.

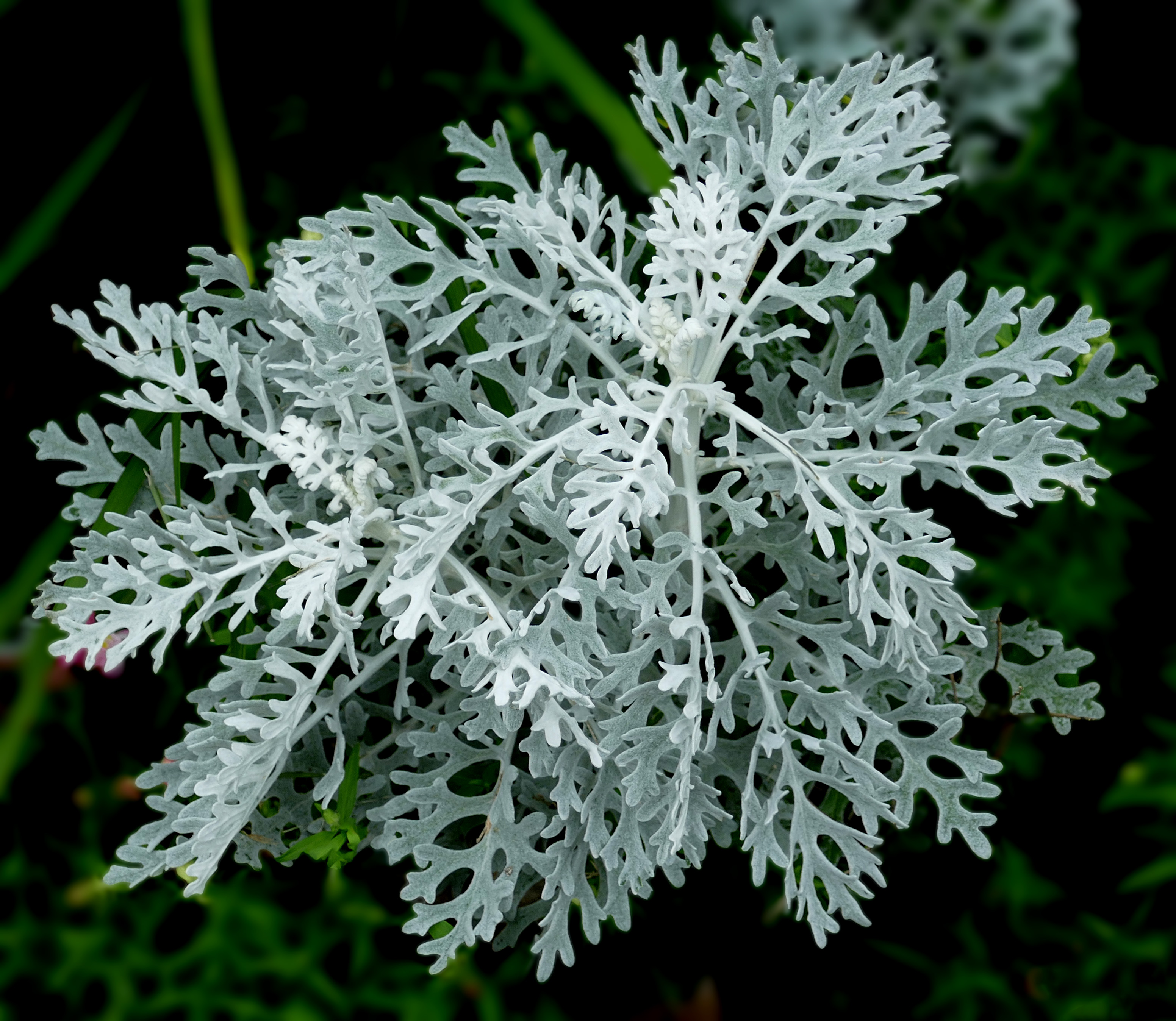
Jacobaea maritima 'Silverdust'

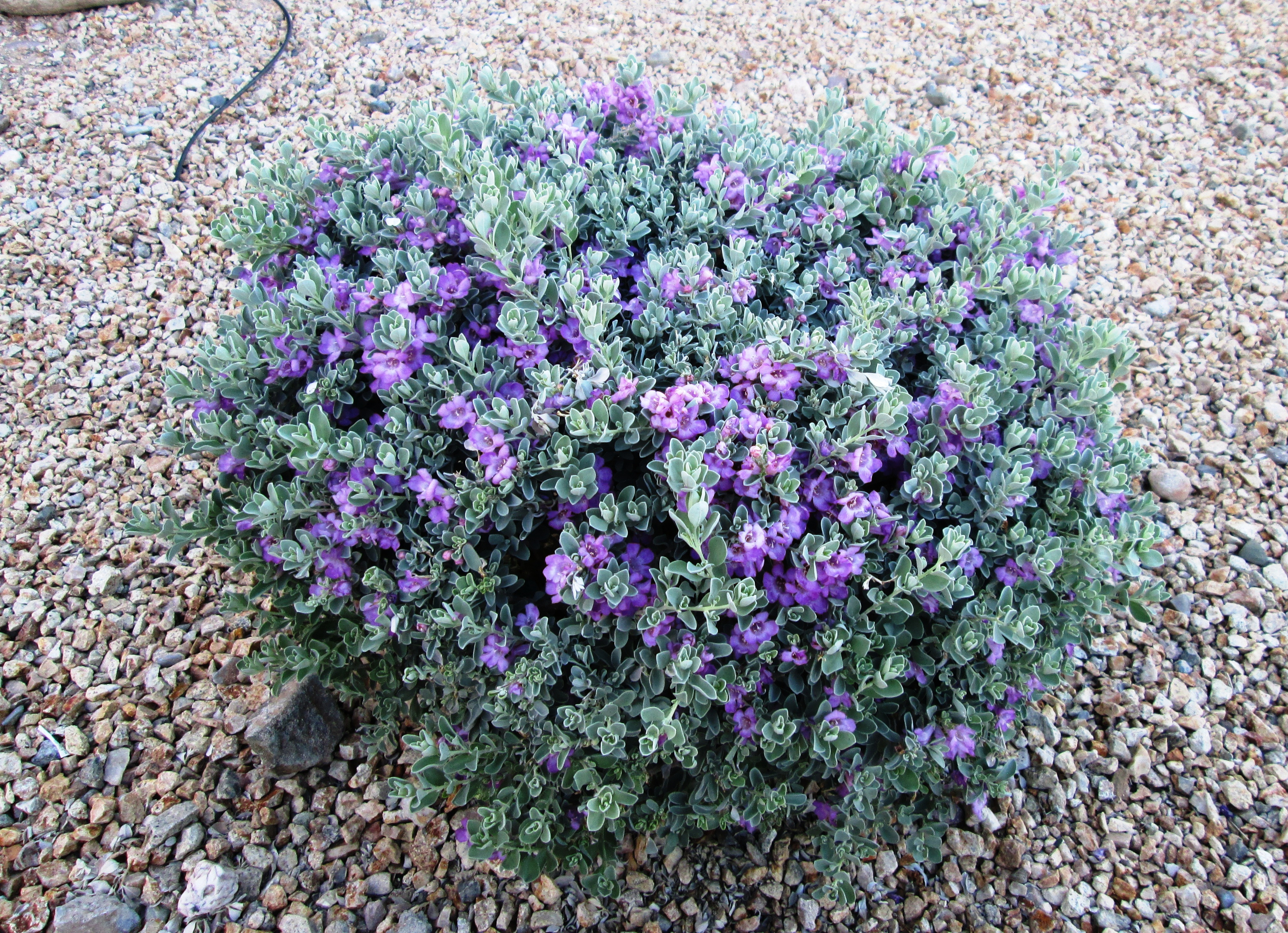
Texas sage

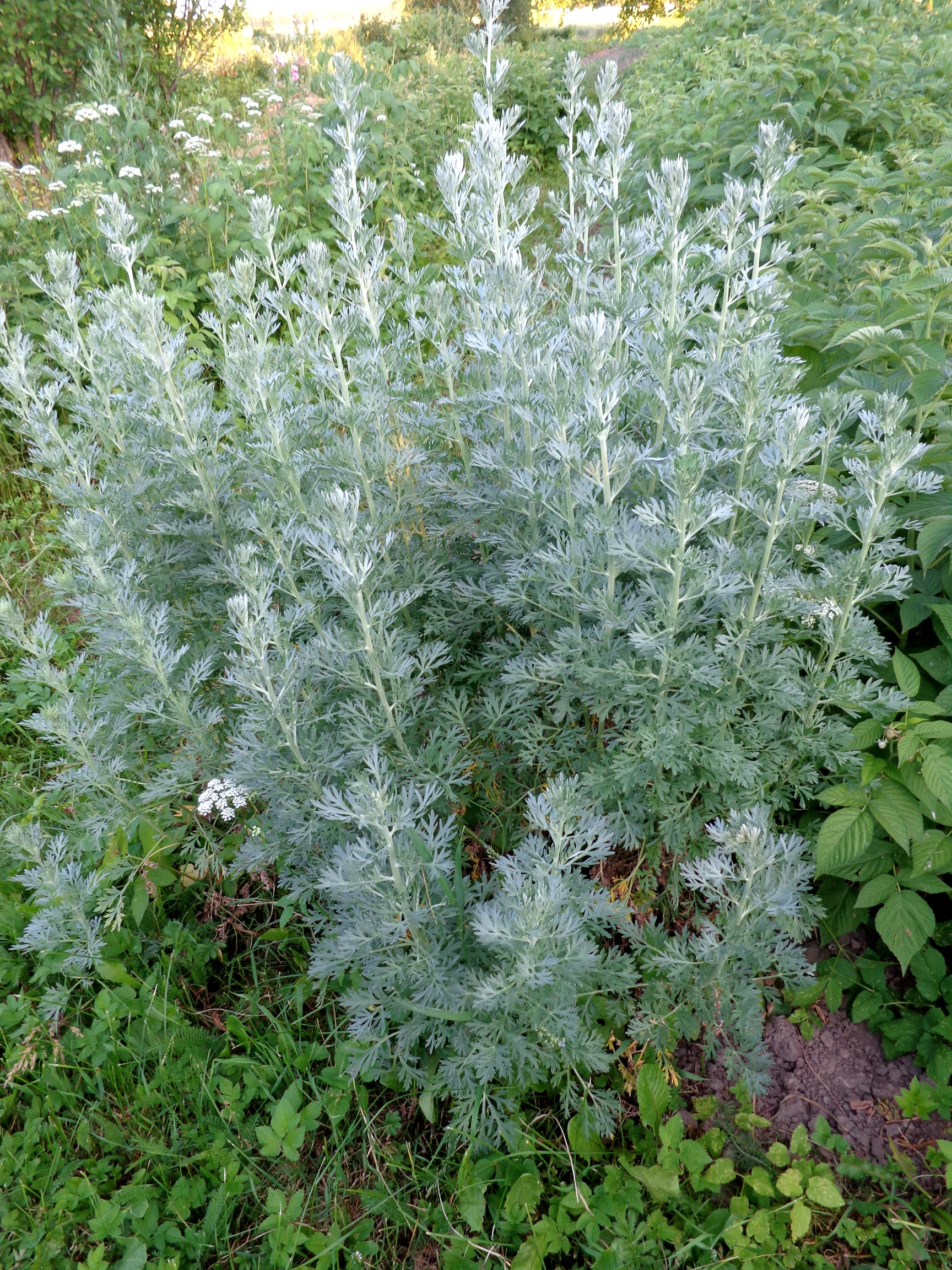
Artemisia absinthium

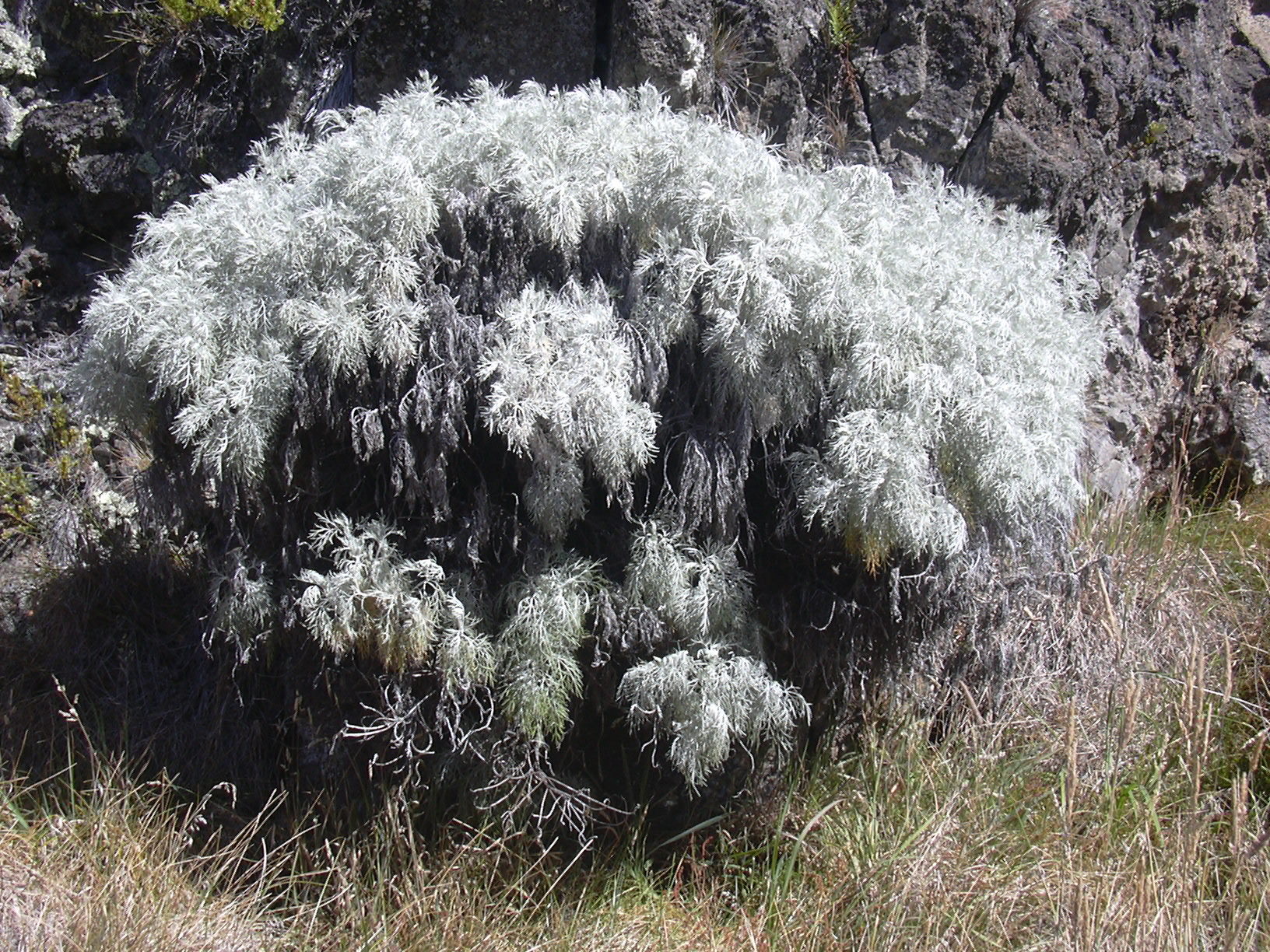
Artemisia mauiensis

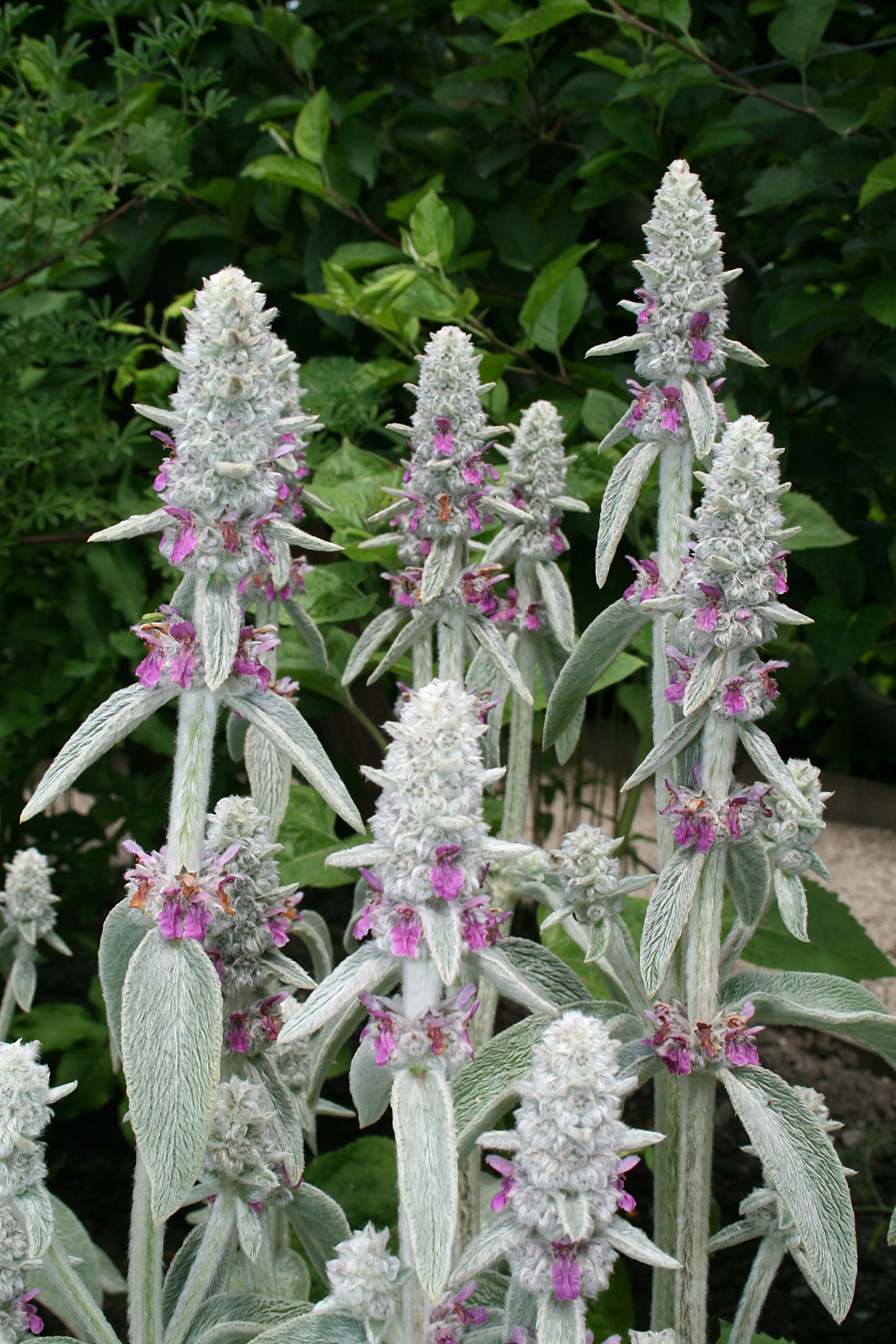
Lamb's ear

== Notable gardens ==
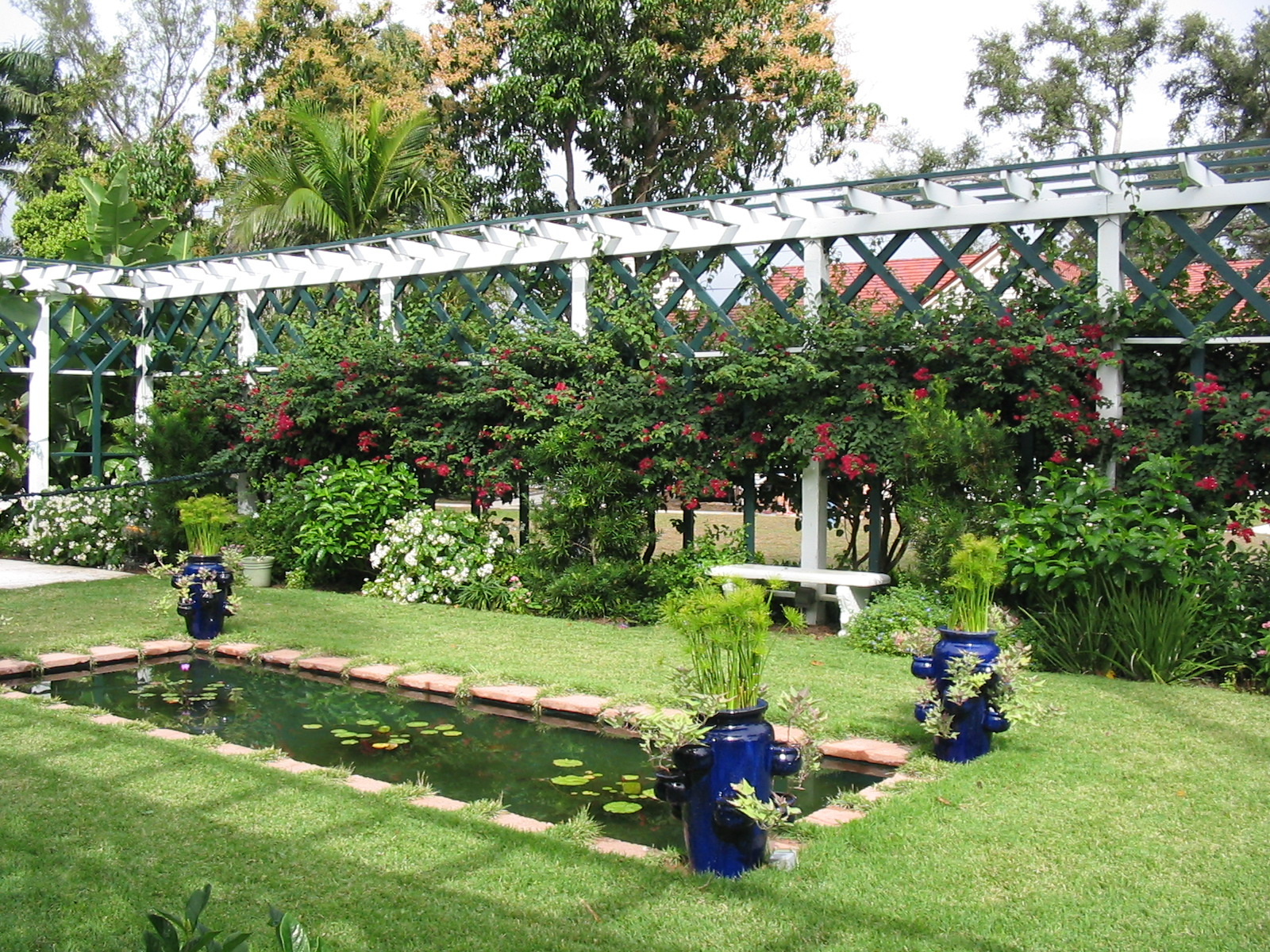
Moonlight Garden, Edison and Ford Winter Estates, Fort Myers, Florida

Gardens open to the public which have moon gardens, and notable gardens originally designed and constructed with a moon garden, include:

- Mehtab Bagh in India
- Sonnenberg Gardens in New York
- Four Arts Botanical Gardens in Florida
- Edison and Ford Winter Estates in Florida
- Chihuahuan Desert Nature Center and Botanical Gardens in Texas
- The Gardens on Spring Creek in Colorado
- San Francisco Botanical Garden in California

== Other uses of the term ==
Sometimes a garden is named a 'moon garden' because it features a significant structural element such as a moon gate, moon window, or moon bridge, however the purpose there is different than a garden designed for nighttime experience. Moon gates and moon windows are constructed to frame a view, have a cultural or spiritual meaning, or may symbolically represent the Moon. Moon bridges are usually ornamental and placed so their half-circular shape reflects into still water making a full circle which symbolizes the Moon.

'Planting by the signs' is often called 'moon gardening' because scheduling planting, cultivating, and harvesting of crops is based on moon phases.

== See also ==
- White garden
- Landscape design
- List of garden types
- Tsukimi
