= Chihuahuan Desert Nature Center and Botanical Gardens =

Nonprofit nature center with botanical gardens near Fort Davis, Texas, United States

Coordinates: 30.5404°N 103.8373°W

- Interactive map of Chihuahuan Desert Nature Center and Botanical Gardens
- Type: Nature center, Botanical garden
- Nearest town: Fort Davis, Texas
- Area: 507 acres (2.05 km^{2})
- Owner: Chihuahuan Desert Research Institute
- Website: www.cdri.org

Chihuahuan Desert Nature Center and Botanical Gardens (507 acres) is a nonprofit nature center with botanical gardens on the grounds of the Chihuahuan Desert Research Institute, the parent organization. It is located off Texas State Highway 118 about 4 miles (6.4 km) south of Fort Davis, Texas, United States. The Center is open Monday through Saturday, except major holidays. An admission fee is charged.

== Description ==
The Nature Center includes grasslands, oak studded hillsides, mountains of volcanic origin, canyon springs, and seasonal wetland pools in the Chihuahuan Desert.

The adobe visitors' center is located at an elevation of 5,040 feet (1,540 m), almost a mile (5,280 feet) high. The surrounding Davis Mountains region is a sky island, with temperatures falling and annual precipitation tending to increase as the elevation rises from the desert floor.

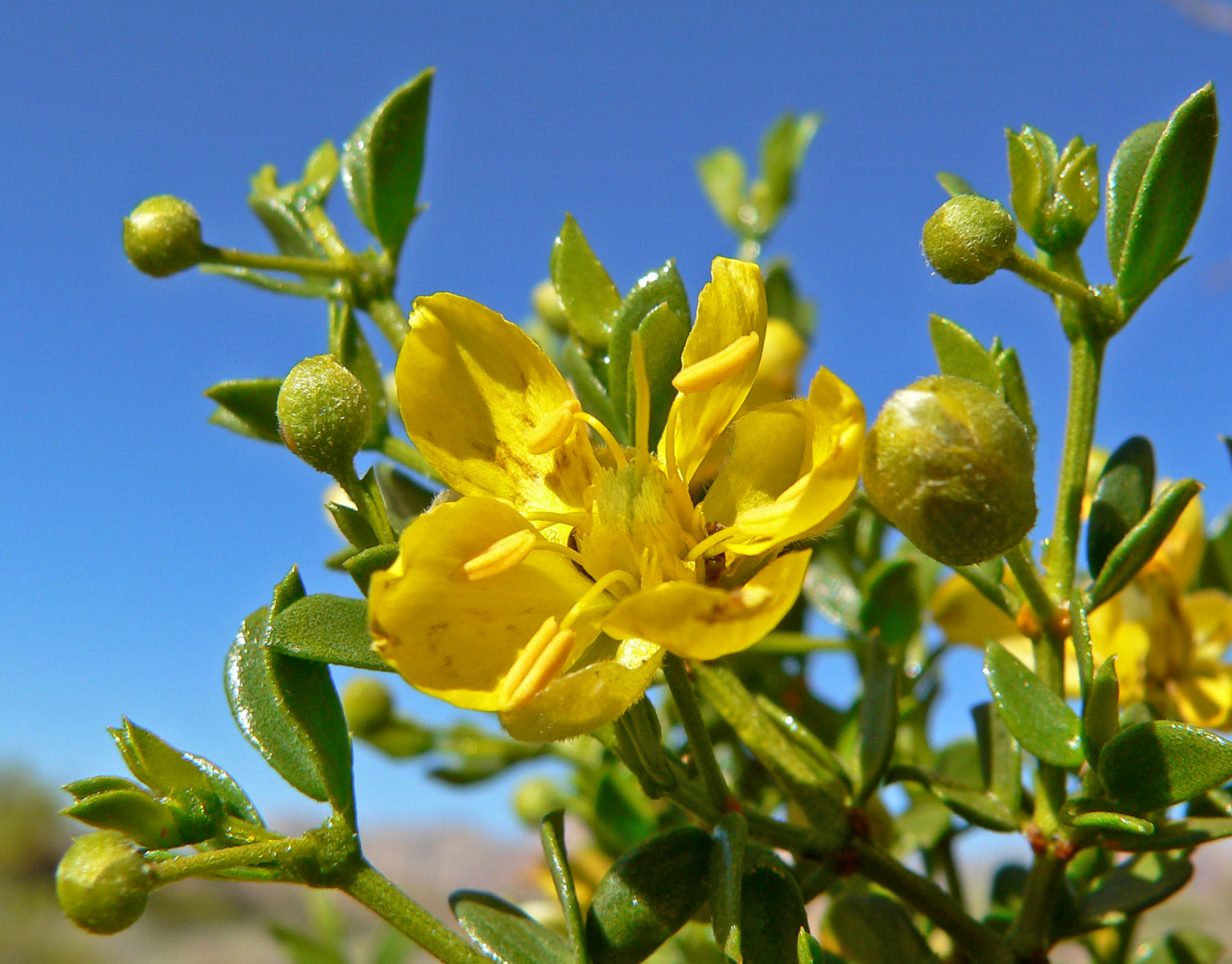
Chihuahuan Desert Nature Center and Botanical Gardens

Exhibits include one about the geologic history of the Davis Mountains and how culture and history are linked to geology; another highlights the history, geology, and culture of mining in the desert region.

The Center contains almost 5 miles (8.0 km) of hiking trails, and features springs and pools, interesting geology, and mountain views. One path goes to the highest point on the Center's land and to the lowest. The local flora includes specimen trees such as some of the largest madrone trees in Texas, majestic Southwestern chokeberries, and Tracey hawthornes; seventeen types of ferns living in clefts in the canyon walls; many succulents and cacti; bird species from the turkey vulture and wild turkeys to hummingbirds overwintering and other birds migrating, with the Montezuma quail, roadrunners, and orioles providing more variety and color during the year.

== Contents ==
The Botanical Gardens (20 acres) include some 165 species of trees, shrubs, and perennial forbs of the Chihuahuan Desert in the arboretum.

The Center has a collection of cacti and succulents from the Chihuahuan Desert. The greenhouse contains about 200 species of Chihuahuan Desert cacti. Many species are in bloom in March and April, but with so many examples, some variety is usually in bloom at any time.

A wildscape garden was installed around the visitors' center in 2004, with a trickling fountain and trees, shrubs, and flowering plants native to the Chihuahuan Desert. The aim is to provide a place where birds, small mammals, and other local wildlife can find food, water, and safety from predators to raise their young.

A pollinator garden was created in 2007 to attract hummingbirds, butterflies, bees, wasps, and flower flies, the desert's native pollinators. The smell of night-blooming plants in the moon garden draws in moths and other nocturnal pollinators. This project was funded, in part, by a grant from the Institute of Museum and Library Services, an agency of the United States Government.

In addition, the Center launched the Chihuahuan Desert Field School in 2004, an educational program targeting 4th grade classes in Brewster, Jeff Davis, and Presidio counties. The overwhelming response led to the inclusion of students from all grade levels and from regions far outside the tri-county Big Bend region. Since its inception, thousands of students have participated in the field school.

The Institute also offers a Life-Long Learning Program featuring workshops, field trips, and lectures on topics related to the natural history of the region. In 2008, the Institute was recognized by the Texas Education Agency as a Continuing Professional Education Provider for the State of Texas.

== See also ==
- List of botanical gardens in the United States
- Nature center
