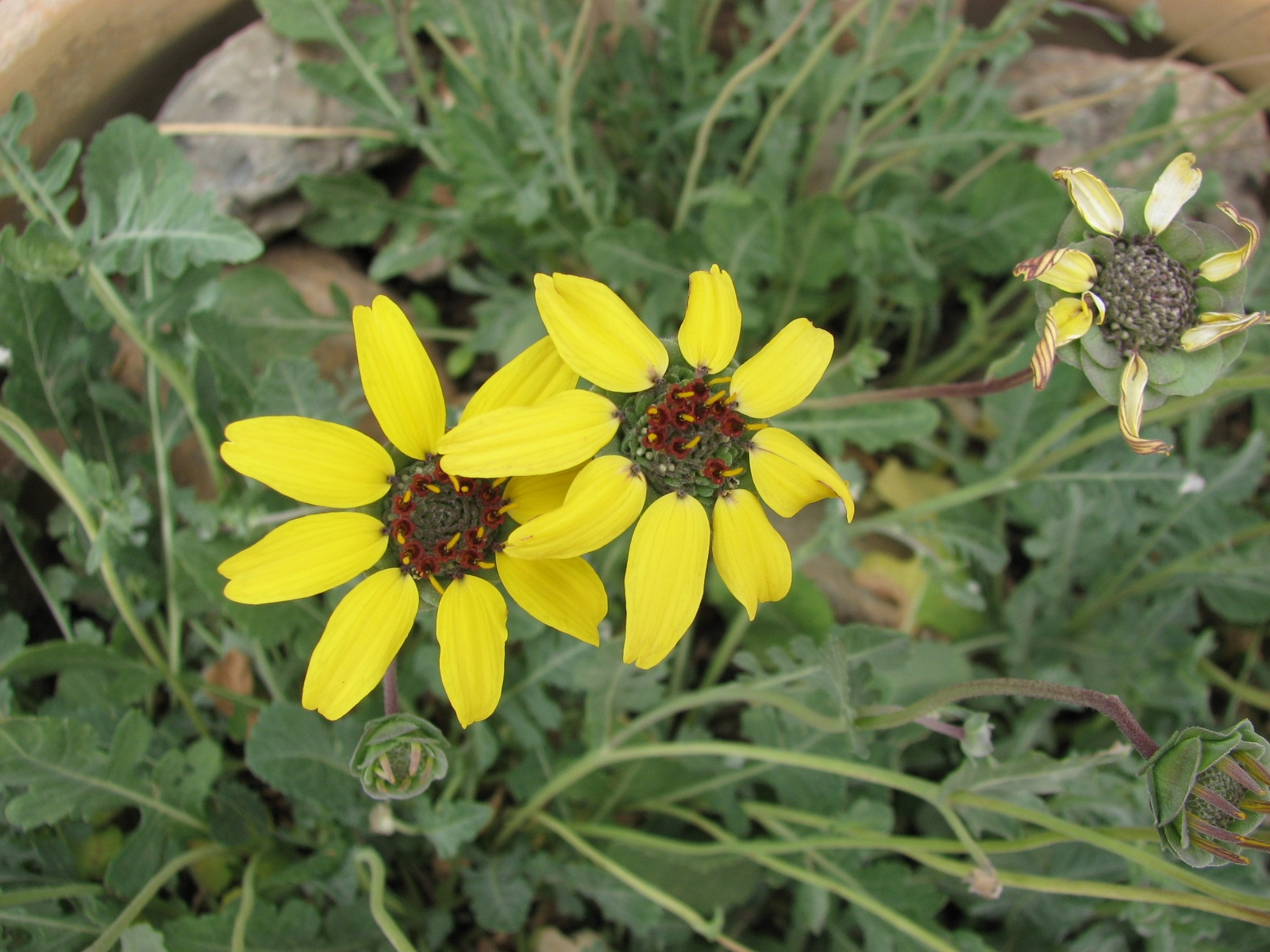
- Berlandiera lyrata

Scientific classification
- Kingdom: Plantae
- Clade: Tracheophytes
- Clade: Angiosperms
- Clade: Eudicots
- Clade: Asterids
- Order: Asterales
- Family: Asteraceae
- Subfamily: Asteroideae
- Tribe: Heliantheae
- Subtribe: Engelmanniinae
- Genus: Berlandiera; DC.

Type species
- Berlandiera texana DC.

= Berlandiera =

Genus of flowering plants

Berlandiera is a genus of flowering plants in the family Asteraceae.

The name honours explorer Jean-Louis Berlandier (1803–1851). The genus is distributed in the United States and Mexico. Species are known generally as greeneyes.

== Description ==
These are perennial herbs and subshrubs, sometimes with annual stems growing from a woody base or taproot. They are a few centimeters tall to well over a meter. The herbage is usually hairy and may be rough or soft in texture. The alternately arranged leaves have variously shaped blades that may be lobed or divided. The flower heads are solitary or borne in wide arrays. There are usually about 8 ray florets, but there may be 2 to 13 per head. They are yellowish on the upper surface but the undersides may be green, red, or maroon, or have darker veins. There are many disc florets in shades of yellow, red, or maroon. The fruit is a hairy black cypsela that is shed from the plant with the remnants of disc florets and phyllaries still attached to it.

== Species ==
Accepted species

Image	Name	Distribution
	Berlandiera basalaris B.L.Turner	Mexico (Nuevo León, Tamaulipas)
	Berlandiera betonicifolia (Hook.) Small	Texas Louisiana Oklahoma
	Berlandiera burroana B.L.Turner	Mexico (Coahuila)
	Berlandiera humilis Small	Florida
	Berlandiera lyrata Benth. – chocolate flower, chocolate daisy, lyreleaf greeneyes	Arizona New Mexico Texas Utah Oklahoma Kansas Colorado, Chihuahua, Coahuila, Durango, Jalisco, Nuevo León, San Luis Potosí, Tamaulipas, Zacatecas, Aguascalientes
	Berlandiera macvaughii B.L.Turner	S. Central U.S.A
	Berlandiera macrophylla (A.Gray) M.E.Jones	Arizona New Mexico Texas
	Berlandiera monocephala (B. L. Turner) Pinkava	Arizona New Mexico Chihuahua, Sonora
	Berlandiera pumila (Michx.) Nutt. – soft greeneyes	Texas LA Oklahoma Arkansas Alabama Georgia Florida South Carolina North Carolina
	Berlandiera subacaulis (Nutt.) Nutt – Florida greeneyes	Florida
	Berlandiera texana DC. – Texas greeneyes	New Mexico Texas Oklahoma Kansas Missouri
