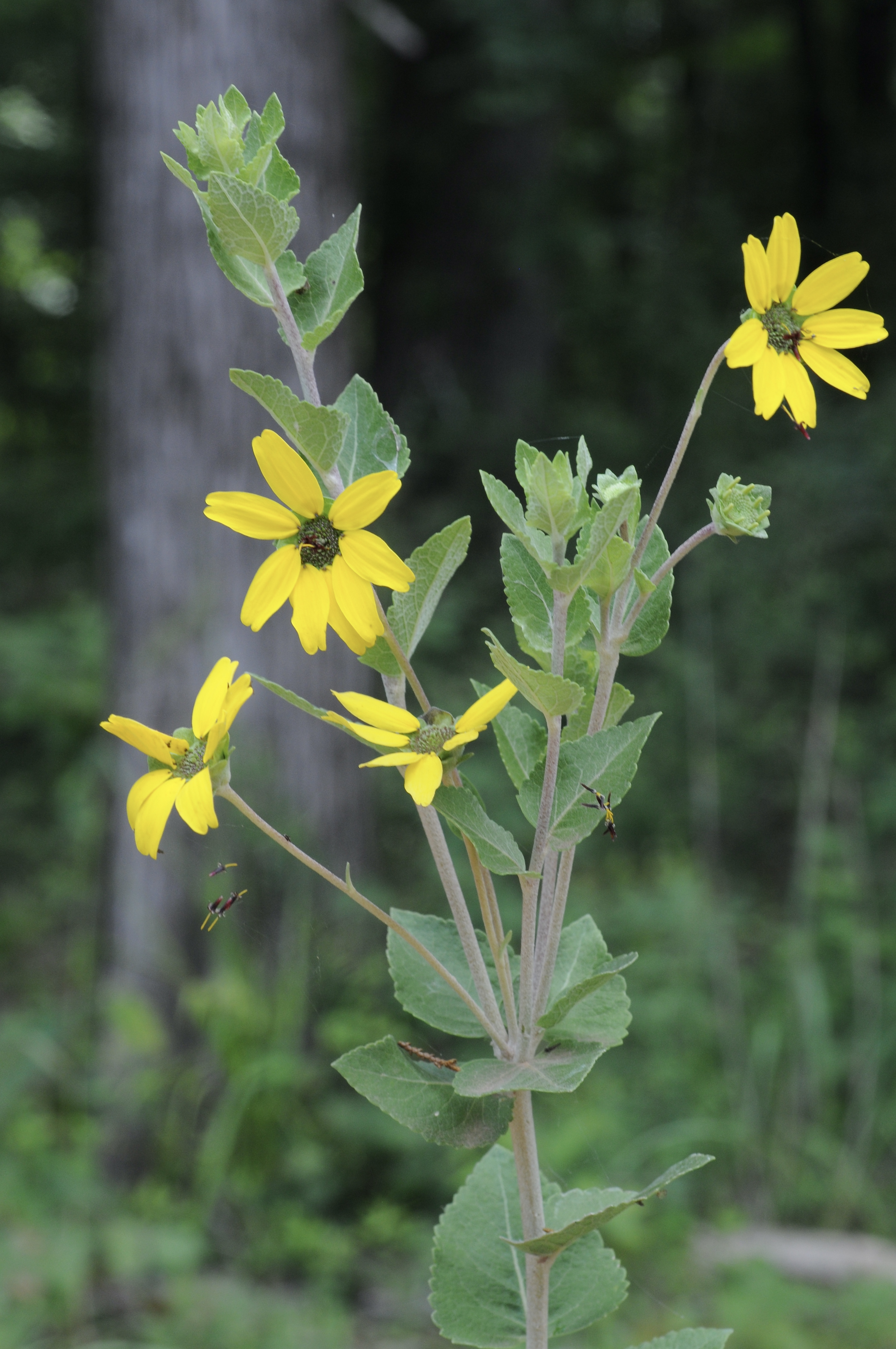

Scientific classification
- Kingdom: Plantae
- Clade: Tracheophytes
- Clade: Angiosperms
- Clade: Eudicots
- Clade: Asterids
- Order: Asterales
- Family: Asteraceae
- Genus: Berlandiera
- Species: B. pumila

Binomial name
- Berlandiera pumila (Michx.) Nutt.

Synonyms
- Silphium pumilum Michx.; Berlandiera dealbata (Torr. & A.Gray) Small; Berlandiera tomentosa (Pursh) Nutt.; Polymnia caroliniana Poir.; Silphium tomentosum herb.banks ex Pursh

= Berlandiera pumila =

Species of flowering plant

Berlandiera pumila, the soft greeneyes, is a North American species of flowering plant in the family Asteraceae. It is native to the southeastern and south-central United States (Texas, Oklahoma, Arkansas, Louisiana, Alabama, Georgia, Florida, South Carolina, and North Carolina).

Berlandiera pumila is a branching herb up to 100 cm (40 inches) tall. It has several flower heads with yellow ray florets and maroon disc florets. It grows in open locations such as fields, roadsides, woodlands, etc.

B. pumila prefers to grow in sandy soil types. It is found in turkey oak hardwood sand ridges, on the borders between sandhills and hammocks, and in longleaf pine-wiregrass sandhill communities.
