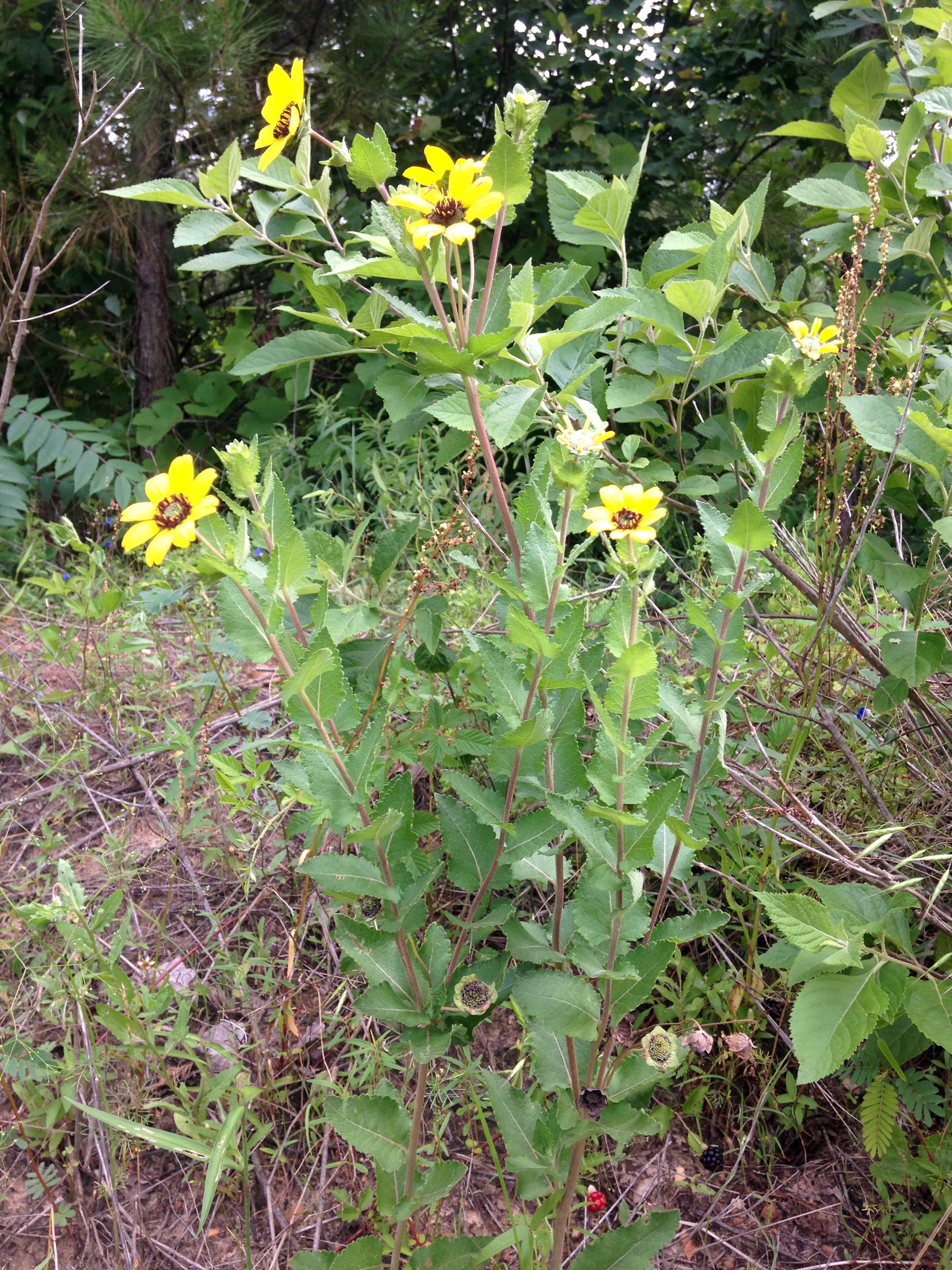

Scientific classification
- Kingdom: Plantae
- Clade: Tracheophytes
- Clade: Angiosperms
- Clade: Eudicots
- Clade: Asterids
- Order: Asterales
- Family: Asteraceae
- Tribe: Heliantheae
- Genus: Berlandiera
- Species: B. texana

Binomial name
- Berlandiera texana DC.

Synonyms
- Berlandiera longifolia Nutt.

= Berlandiera texana =

Species of flowering plant

Berlandiera texana is a North American species of flowering plant in the family Asteraceae. It is commonly known as Texas greeneyes. It is native to the south-central United States, in the states of Texas, New Mexico, Oklahoma, Kansas, Missouri, Arkansas, and Louisiana.

Berlandiera texana is an herb up to 120 cm (48 inches or 4 feet) tall. It has several flower heads with yellow ray florets and red disc florets. Flowers bloom March to November. The species is found in dry locations in open woodlands and thickets. The Latin specific epithet texana is in reference to the state of Texas, where it grows.
