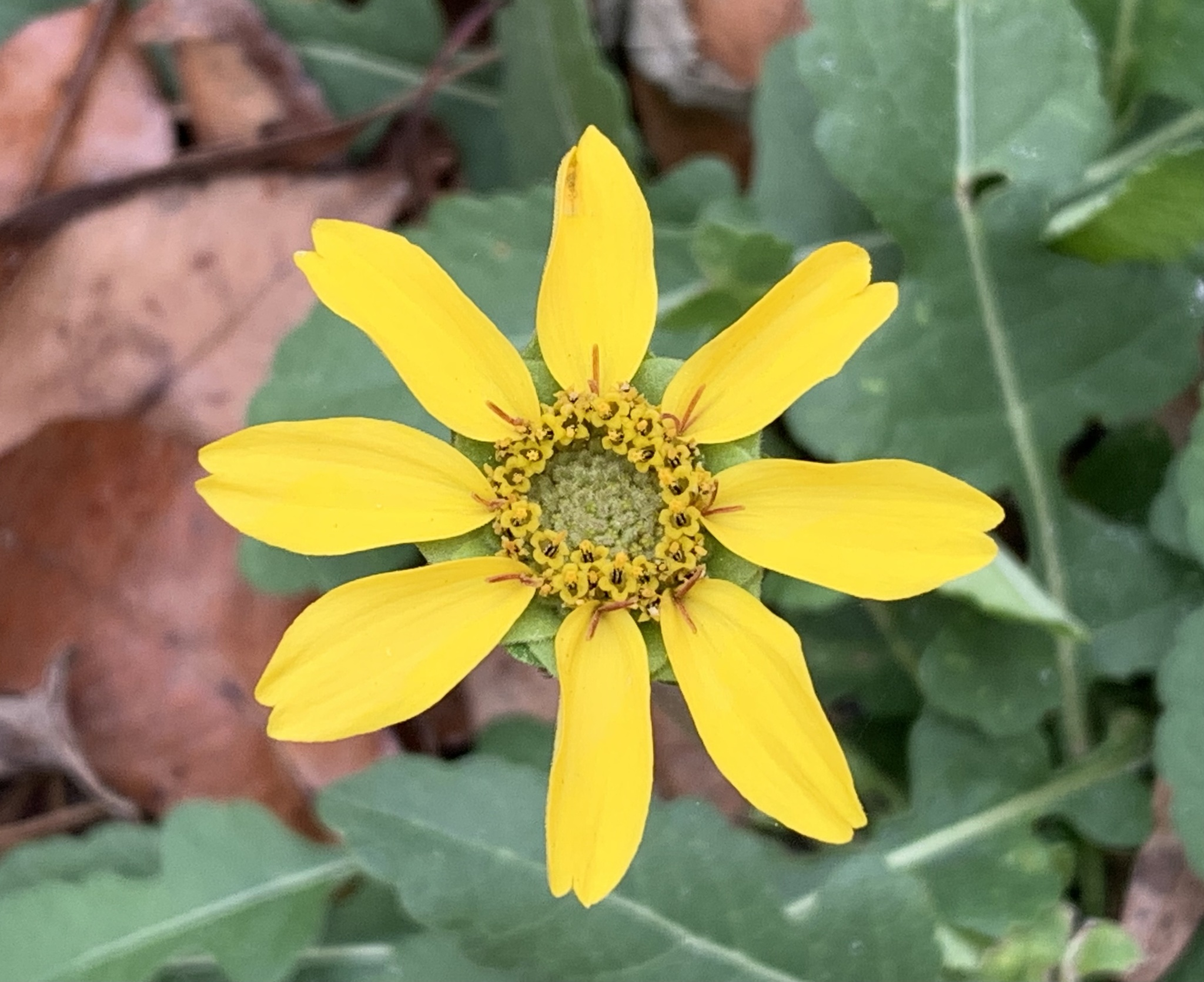

Conservation status
- Apparently Secure (NatureServe)

Scientific classification
- Kingdom: Plantae
- Clade: Tracheophytes
- Clade: Angiosperms
- Clade: Eudicots
- Clade: Asterids
- Order: Asterales
- Family: Asteraceae
- Tribe: Heliantheae
- Genus: Berlandiera
- Species: B. subacaulis

Binomial name
- Berlandiera subacaulis (Nutt.) Nutt.

Synonyms
- Berlandiera subacaule (Nutt.) Nutt.; Silphium nuttallianum Torr.; Silphium subacaule Nutt.

= Berlandiera subacaulis =

Species of flowering plant

Berlandiera subacaulis is a North American species of flowering plant in the family Asteraceae. It is found only in Florida. The common name is Florida greeneyes.

Berlandiera subacaulis is a branching herb up to 50 cm (20 in) tall. It generally has only one flower head with lemon yellow ray florets and red or maroon disc florets. It grows in dry, sandy locations.
