= Hayat Bakhsh Bagh =

Coordinates: 28.657765°N 77.242621°E

The Hayat Baksh Bagh, which means "Life-bestowing garden", is the largest of the gardens in the Red Fort in Old Delhi . The North Eastern portion of the Red Fort. It was built by Mughal Emperor Shah Jahan. The garden is beautifully decorated by pools, fountains, canals, walled enclosures and channels. Mostly the Mughal architectures are inspired by Islamic culture but this garden is more influenced by Persian culture.

== History ==
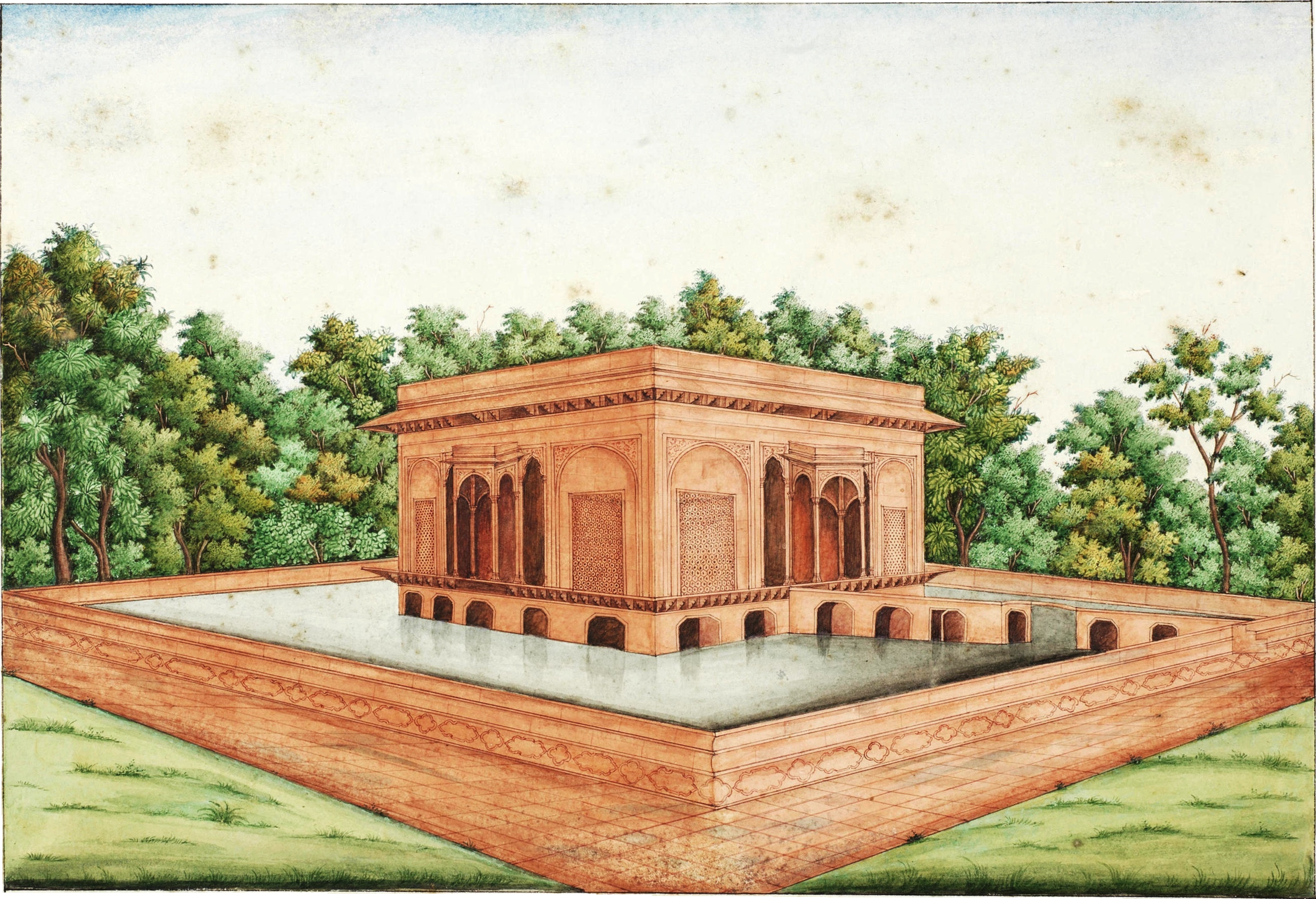
View of the Zafar Mahal (before 1854, by Ghulam Ali Khan)

It was laid out by Shah Jahan I. It is in the shape of a square, around 200 feet on a side. The garden was largely destroyed by the British colonial forces following the failed 1857 rebellion. Most of the garden was built over by stone barracks by the British colonialists after 1857. Lord Curzon had some elements of the garden restored.

The garden is divided into four squares, with causeways, water channels and a star-shaped parterre framed with red sandstone. Originally, flowers in blue, white and purple were planted throughout.

Three structures have survived from the time:

== Sawan and Bhadon ==
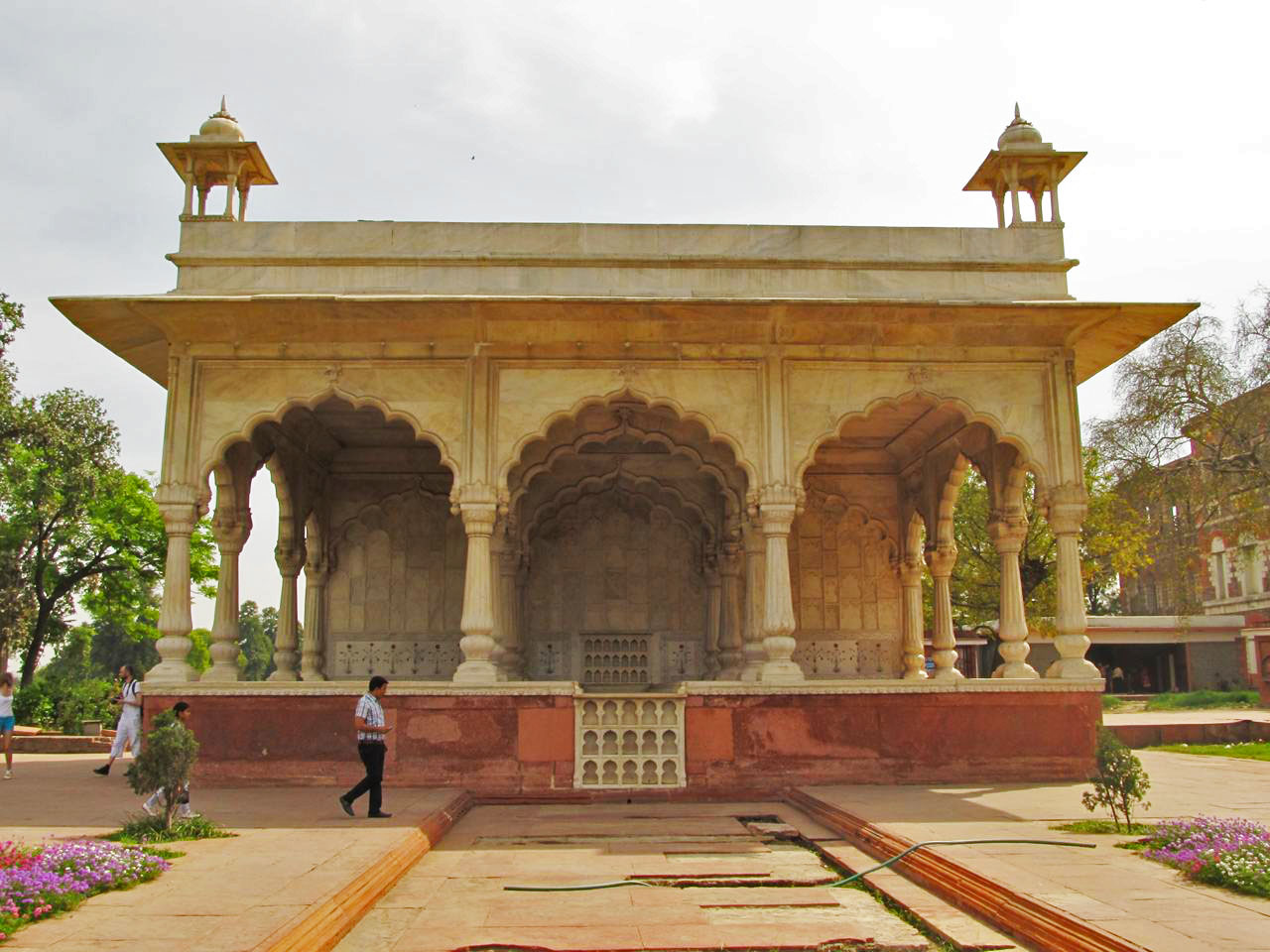
One of the Sawan/Bhadon pavilions

The Sawan and Bhadon pavilions (mandap) are two almost identical structures facing on opposite ends of the canal. They are carved out of white marble. A feature is a section of a wall with niches. Originally small oil lamps would be lit and placed in these niches at night, or vases with golden flowers be placed during the day. The water from the channel would cascade over it, creating the impression of a golden curtain. The names Sawan and Bhadon are the two rainy months in the Hindu calendar during the monsoon. It is not clear however which pavilion carries which name.

== Zafar Mahal ==
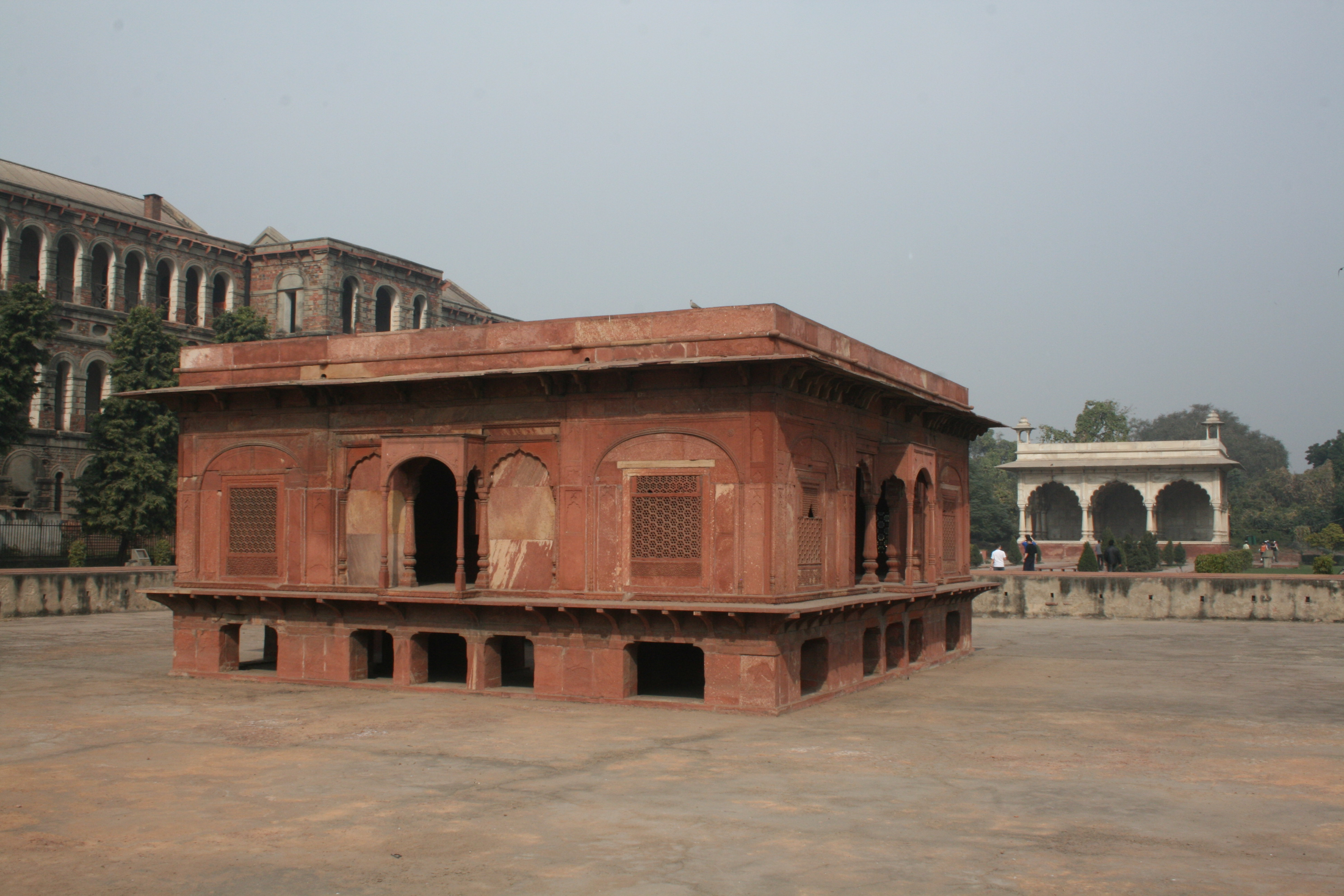
The red Zafar Mahal and the white Sawan/Bhadon pavilion behind it

In the middle between the two pavilions lies the Zafar Mahal. This structure was constructed during the reign of Bahadur Shah II in 1842 and named after him. This pavilion stands in the middle of a pre-existing water tank. It is made out of red sandstone, which was cheaper than white marble. Originally a red sandstone bridge led into the pavilion, which was probably lost after the Indian Rebellion of 1857. After the occupation in 1857, the tank was used for a while as a swimming pool by the British troops.

== Mehtab Bagh ==
West of the garden was another one called Mehtab Bagh, or the "moon garden". This garden was completely destroyed by the British after the failed rebellion and four large military barracks constructed on its spot. There are plans to restore the garden.

Near the northwest corner is a baoli tank. The road from the baoli leads due south to the Delhi Gate of the fort.
