= Donald John Pinkava =

American botanist (1933–2017)

Dr Donald John Pinkava (1933–25 July 2017) was a botanist, specializing in cacti and succulents, and he is the discoverer of some of their varieties. He was Professor Emeritus at Arizona State University (ASU). He was married to Mary Klements Pinkava, and they have one daughter, Michelle Shaw, and two grandchildren.
