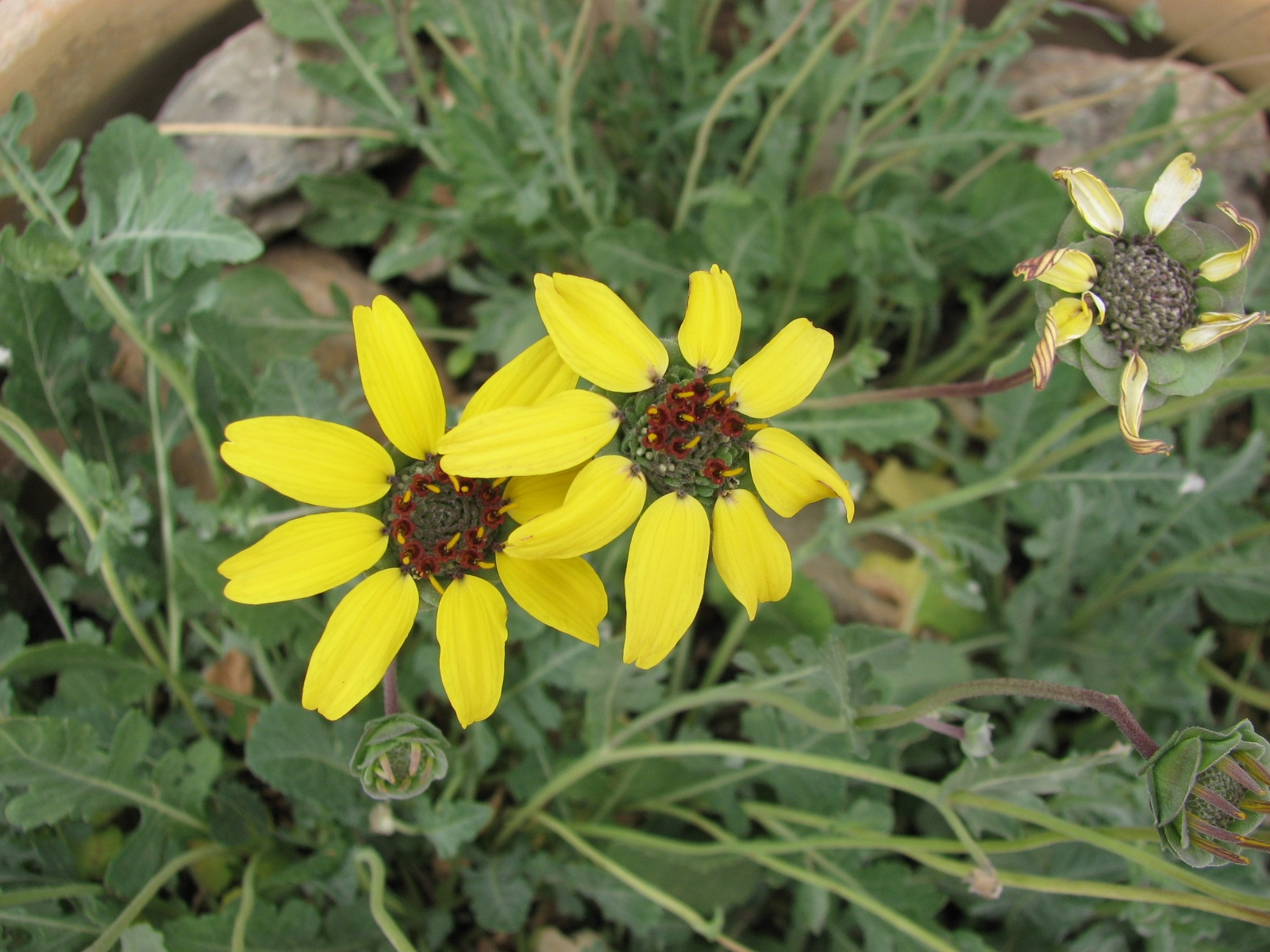

Conservation status
- Secure (NatureServe)

Scientific classification
- Kingdom: Plantae
- Clade: Tracheophytes
- Clade: Angiosperms
- Clade: Eudicots
- Clade: Asterids
- Order: Asterales
- Family: Asteraceae
- Tribe: Heliantheae
- Genus: Berlandiera
- Species: B. lyrata

Binomial name
- Berlandiera lyrata Benth.

Synonyms
- Berlandiera incisa Torr. & A.Gray

= Berlandiera lyrata =

Species of flowering plant

Berlandiera lyrata, with the common names chocolate flower, chocolate daisy, or lyreleaf greeneyes, is a North American species of flowering plant in the family Asteraceae. The common name lyreleaf greeneyes is a reference to the shape of the leaf, which is curved like a lyre and the green disc which is left behind when the ray florets drop off which is thought to look like an eye.

This plant is particularly notable for its distinct chocolate-like fragrance, especially during the early morning hours, making it popular in sensory gardens and pollinator habitats. Native to the southwestern United States and northern Mexico, Berlandiera lyrata is drought-tolerant and thrives in arid, rocky soils. Its bright yellow flowers not only add visual appeal but also attract various pollinators, including bees and butterflies, playing an important ecological role in supporting local biodiversity.

== Description ==
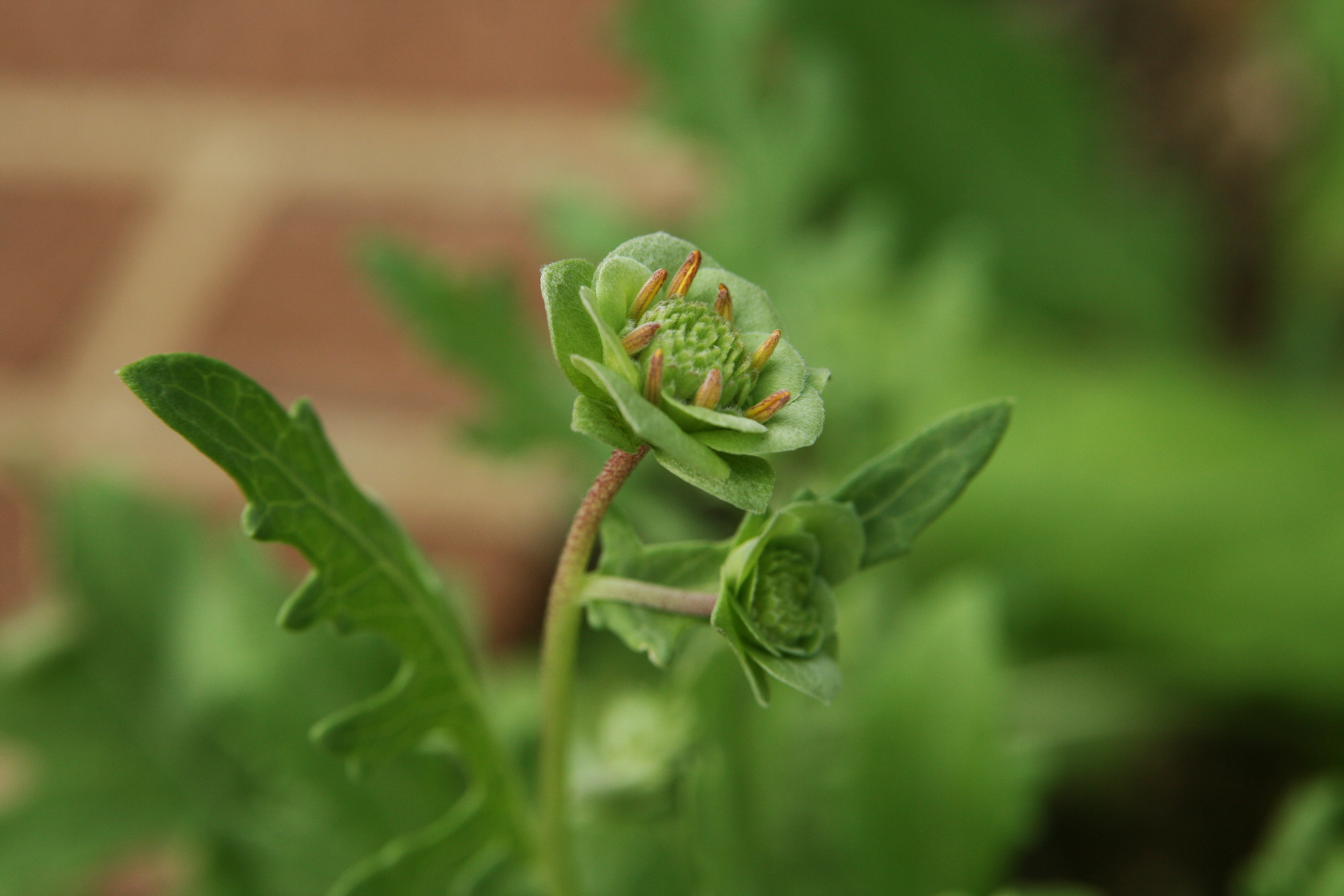
Going to seed, in the Missouri Botanical Garden

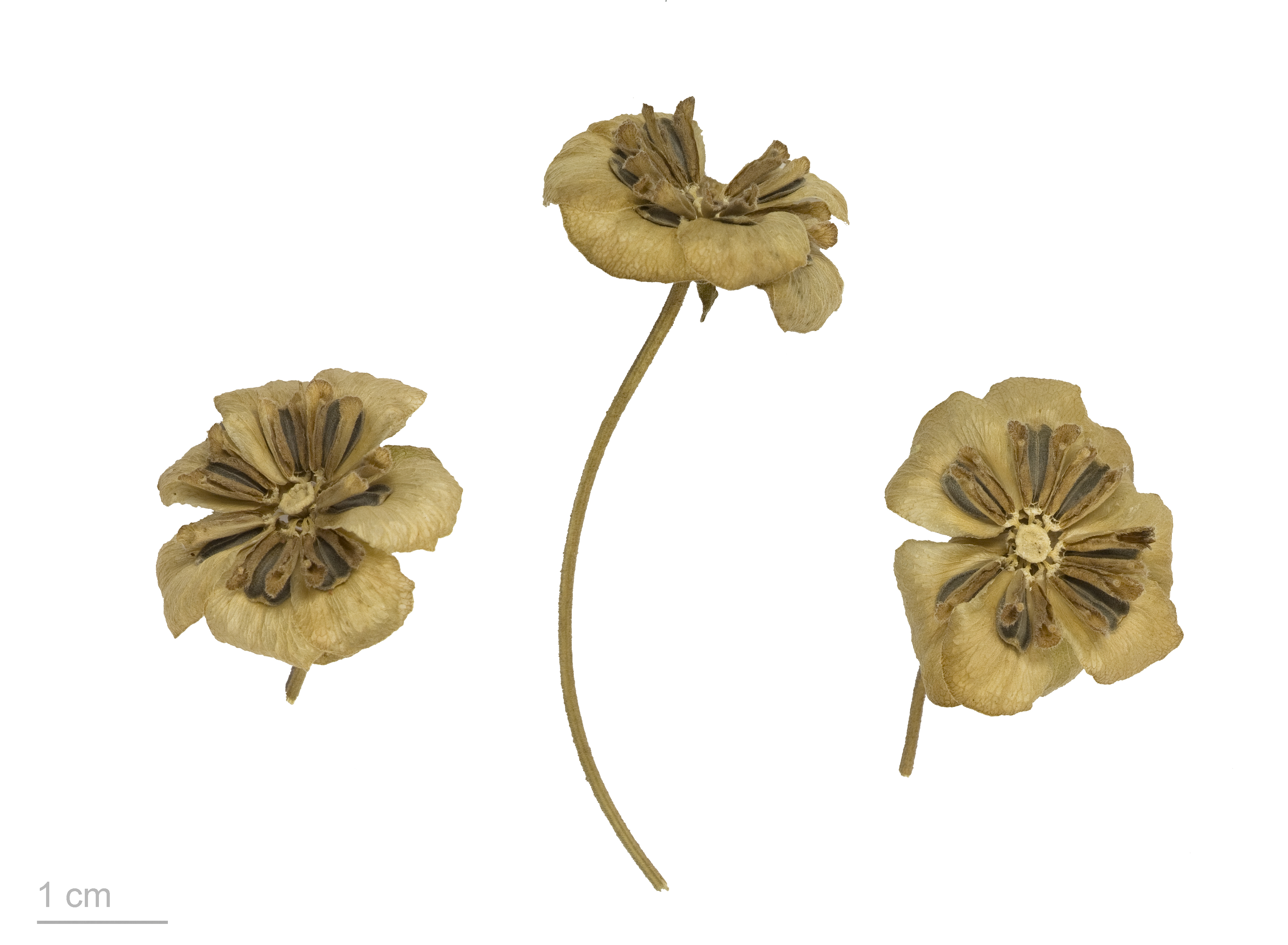
Fruits and seeds — MHNT

The plant grows to about 30–60 centimetres (1–2 feet) in height and width, less commonly 120 cm (4 ft). When the plant freezes, the roots will preserve its life. The velvety leaves are pinnately lobed or scalloped. The flower head is approximately 4 cm (1 1/2 inches) in diameter, with 5–12 (most commonly 8) yellow ray florets, which are 1.5 cm (5/8 in) long. In areas that freeze, the flowers bloom at night from spring until frost. In frost-free areas, it will bloom year-round (typically April to October). Around mid-morning, the flowers close or drop. As it gets hotter, the flower begins to turn white and the ray florets begin to drop, leaving the green disc shape. The seed-like fruit is scaleless and hairless at the tip.

== Distribution and habitat ==
In the United States, the species is native to Colorado, Kansas, Oklahoma, Arizona, New Mexico, Texas, and Arkansas. In Mexico, it is native to Chihuahua, Coahuila, Nuevo León, San Luis Potosí, Durango, Sonora, Zacatecas, Aguascalientes and Jalisco. It prefers the U.S. Department of Agriculture's hardiness zones of 4 to 9, and can be grown in elevations as high as 2,100 m (7,000 ft). It can usually be found in grassy areas and rocky soil.

== Cultivation ==
B. lyrata is a hardy perennial, cultivated as an ornamental plant. It is grown in gardens for the chocolate-like scent of its flowers. The chocolate odor can also be produced by plucking the ray florets from the flower head. To ensure that it will continue to bloom as long as possible, spent flowers should be removed.

It grows best in full sun locations. It is native to soil types that are dry, shallow and rocky such as sandy loams and limestone soils. It is known to grow along roadsides and in grasslands in the southwest US. It is drought-tolerant. In heavy, wet soils, B. lyrata is subject to root rot. B. lyrata can be planted in areas that are mowed frequently and can be mowed itself.

The plant is propagated through seeds which can be collected from the plant itself and germinated outdoors from spring to fall.

== Uses ==
The flower head is known to attract beneficial insects to the garden.

The stamens have a chocolate flavor and are edible. The plant was also used by Native Americans to alleviate symptoms of stomach problems. Some Native American cultures would burn the dried roots of the plant in order to treat nervous conditions or to inspire courage.
