= Chihuahuan Desert Research Institute =

Coordinates: 30.560°N 103.841°W

The Chihuahuan Desert Research Institute (CDRI), incorporated in December 1973, is an independent non-profit, scientific and educational organization conducting its operations as a multi-featured Nature Center and Botanical Gardens located on a 507-acre (2.05 km^{2}) tract in the foothills of the Davis Mountains. The organization's mission is to promote public awareness, appreciation, and concern for nature generally and the natural diversity of the Chihuahuan Desert region specifically through education, the visitor experience, and through the support of research. Its original principal founders were Science professors at Sul Ross State University, a university that the institute continues to work closely with, as well as a variety of other TEA Region 18 public schools, grades Pre-K through 12, regional colleges and universities, and other non-profit organizations. Since 2018, Lisa Fargason Gordon has served as the Executive Director, working with a small team of employees, along with many members, volunteers, and board members.

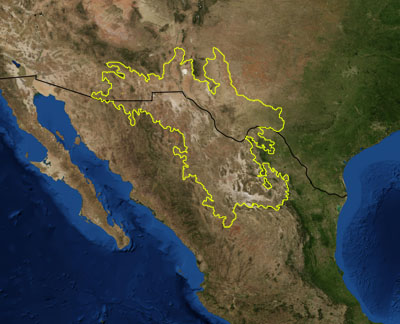
Map of the Chihuahuan Desert. Satellite image from NASA. Ecoregion boundary based on World Wide Fund for Nature ecoregions. The US–Mexico border is shown as a black line.

== History ==
From its inception in December 1973 to 1983, the Institute was housed in the Centennial School Building in Alpine, Texas. The Alpine Independent School District generously leased the facility to CDRI at the rate of $1.00 per year.

In 1983, Centennial School was sold and the CDRI moved to Honors Hall on the campus of Sul Ross State University. While headquartered on the Sul Ross State University campus, the Institute conducted its activities from Honors Hall (1983-1991), and later from the Barton Warnock Science Building (1991-1997).

== Education and outreach ==
CDRI publishes a monthly e-mail newsletter, The Desert Newsflash, which is distributed to nearly 5,000 subscribers. Several years ago, CDRI staff helped write a weekly radio program, Nature Notes, which aired on KRTS, the National Public Radio affiliate in Marfa, Texas.

To extend its goal of research and education to the geology of the Desert, CDRI installed a geological exhibit on the highest point of the Institute’s site, named Clayton's Overlook. The exhibit allows for the disassembly of the 360° panorama presented by its mountain top location into eight individual views and provides a focal point for their re-assembly and integration as a visual representation, study, and explanation of the geology which controls that panorama. The display first focuses on the immediate area, where three igneous cored domes (diameters: 3–4 km) and other associated intrusions, including the igneous stock on which the pavilion itself sits, are well exposed. These domes are thought to be cored by laccoliths. The topography of the domes is variable, as is the degree of exposure of the actual intrusions; in fact, the only exposure of the intrusion coring one of the domes is on a fault located along its north edge (trap door laccolith?). The thrust of the display relates the view of the domes from the pavilion to the view presented in maps and cross sections, as well as the view presented by satellite images. Other displays at the pavilion take advantage of broader views of the Davis Mountains. For example, in the core of another of these domes, the contact of the Crossen Trachyte, a major mapping unit in the south of the range, and the Star Mountain Formation, another mapping unit but in the north of the range, can be seen. This is the only location in the whole of the range where their contact can be mapped. The Crossen extends to Crossen Mesa, 64 km to the south; the Star Mountain 50 km to the north. As seen from the pavilion, it is dramatically exposed in the cliffs of Star Mountain, 27 km away. Each of the panels found on Clayton's Overlook are also displayed in the Powell Visitor Center's lobby, to be studied before or after experiencing them at the summit, or to be enjoyed by those who are unable to see them outdoors.

== Land acquisition ==
In two distinct but connected transactions, 1978 and 1984, CDRI purchased the 507-acre (2.05 km^{2}) tract. This site has been developed as a multi-featured Nature Center and Botanical Gardens, from which research is conducted and educational programs are delivered to students and adult visitors alike. With the construction of its new Visitor Center in January 1998, the CDRI moved operations from the Sul Ross campus to its permanent home near Fort Davis where it has been open to the public year-round ever since. In August 2015, the Visitor Center was dedicated as the Powell Visitor Center, in honor of a co-founder, Dr. Mike Powell, recognized botanist and Director of the SRSU Herbarium. Dr. Powell and his wife Shirley are still active with CDRI. Another co-founder, Dr. James Scudday has been recognized by CDRI by the forming and funding of an undergraduate scholarship fund for graduate science students, named the Scudday Scholarship Fund. Nominated students are selected and awarded scholarships by a committee appointed by CDRI's Board of Directors.

== Funding ==
CDRI operations are funded through admissions, programs, tax-deductible contributions, annual memberships, the proceeds from special events, and short and long-term investments. Clayton Williams, a founding member of CDRI has, along with others, generously donated meaningful resources to the institute. A significant bequest from the estate of renowned biologist Roger Conant in 2005, and a separate similar bequest by Kathryn J. Gloyd in 2010, helped fund a permanent endowment which is managed by a Board committee.

== See also ==
- Chihuahuan Desert Nature Center and Botanical Gardens
